= Zeiselbach =

River in Germany

- The Zeiselbach shortly before it flows into the Tegernsee

- Mouth of the Zeiselbach

Location
- Country: Germany
- State: Bavaria

Physical characteristics
- Mouth
  - location: Tegernsee
  - coordinates: 47.7118°N 11.7301°E

Basin features
- Progression: Mangfall→ Inn→ Danube→ Black Sea

Zeiselbach is a small river of Bavaria, Germany. It is a tributary of the Tegernsee, which is drained by the Mangfall.

== See also ==
- List of rivers of Bavaria
