= Entenbach =

River in Germany

Location
- Country: Germany
- State: Bavaria

Entenbach is a river of Bavaria, Germany, which flows through the Englischer Garten of Munich.

== See also ==
- List of rivers of Bavaria
