= Schandtauber =

River in Germany

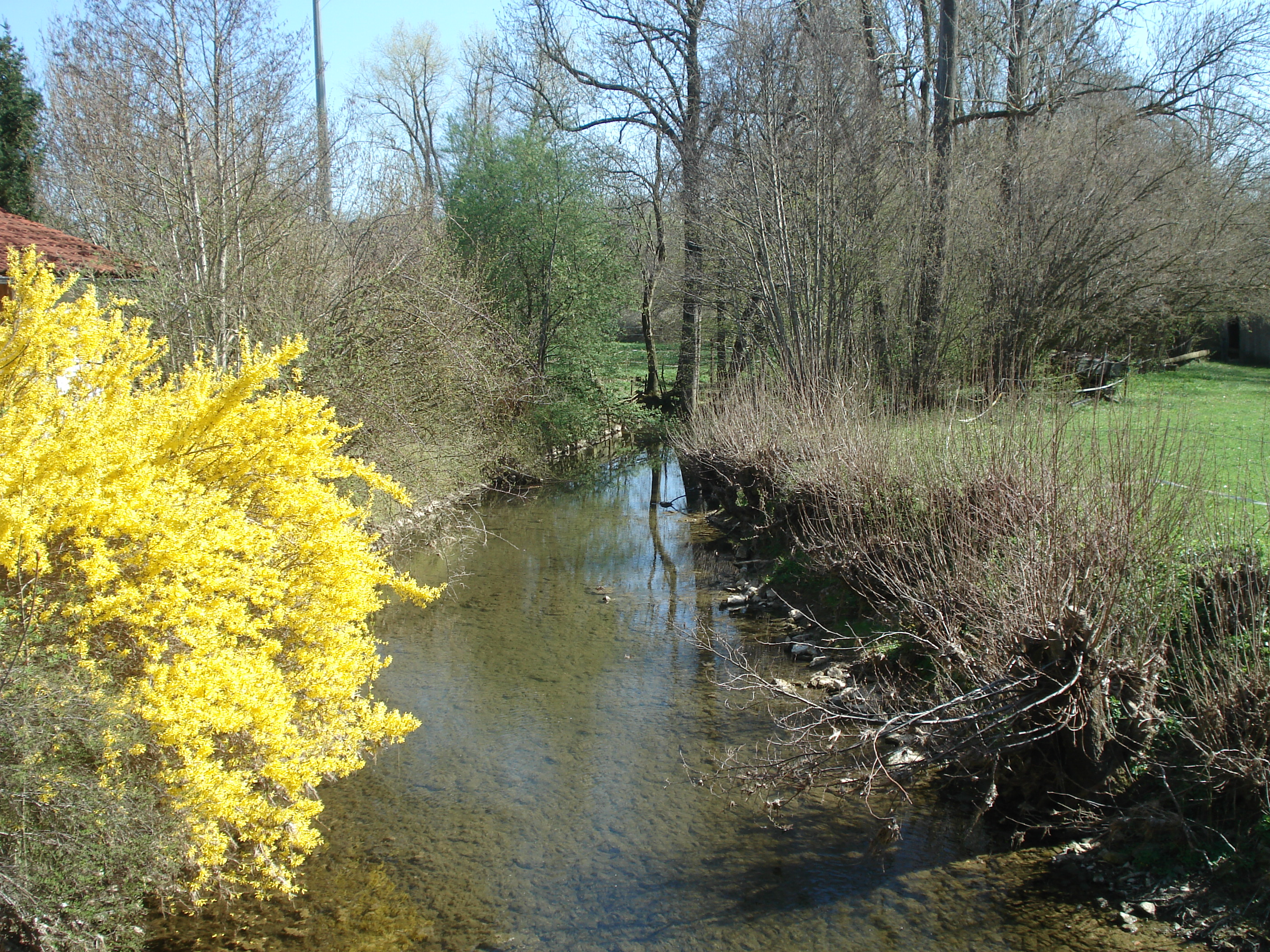
- The Schandtauber in Bettenfeld, a borough of Rothenburg ob der Tauber

Location
- Country: Germany
- State: Baden-Württemberg, Bavaria

Physical characteristics
- Mouth
  - location: Tauber
  - coordinates: 49°22′04″N 10°10′55″E
- Length: 13.8 km (8.6 mi)

Basin features
- Progression: Tauber→ Main→ Rhine→ North Sea

Schandtauber is a river of Baden-Württemberg and Bavaria, Germany. It flows into the Tauber in Rothenburg ob der Tauber.

== See also ==
- List of rivers of Baden-Württemberg
- List of rivers of Bavaria
