= Einfallsgraben =

River in Germany

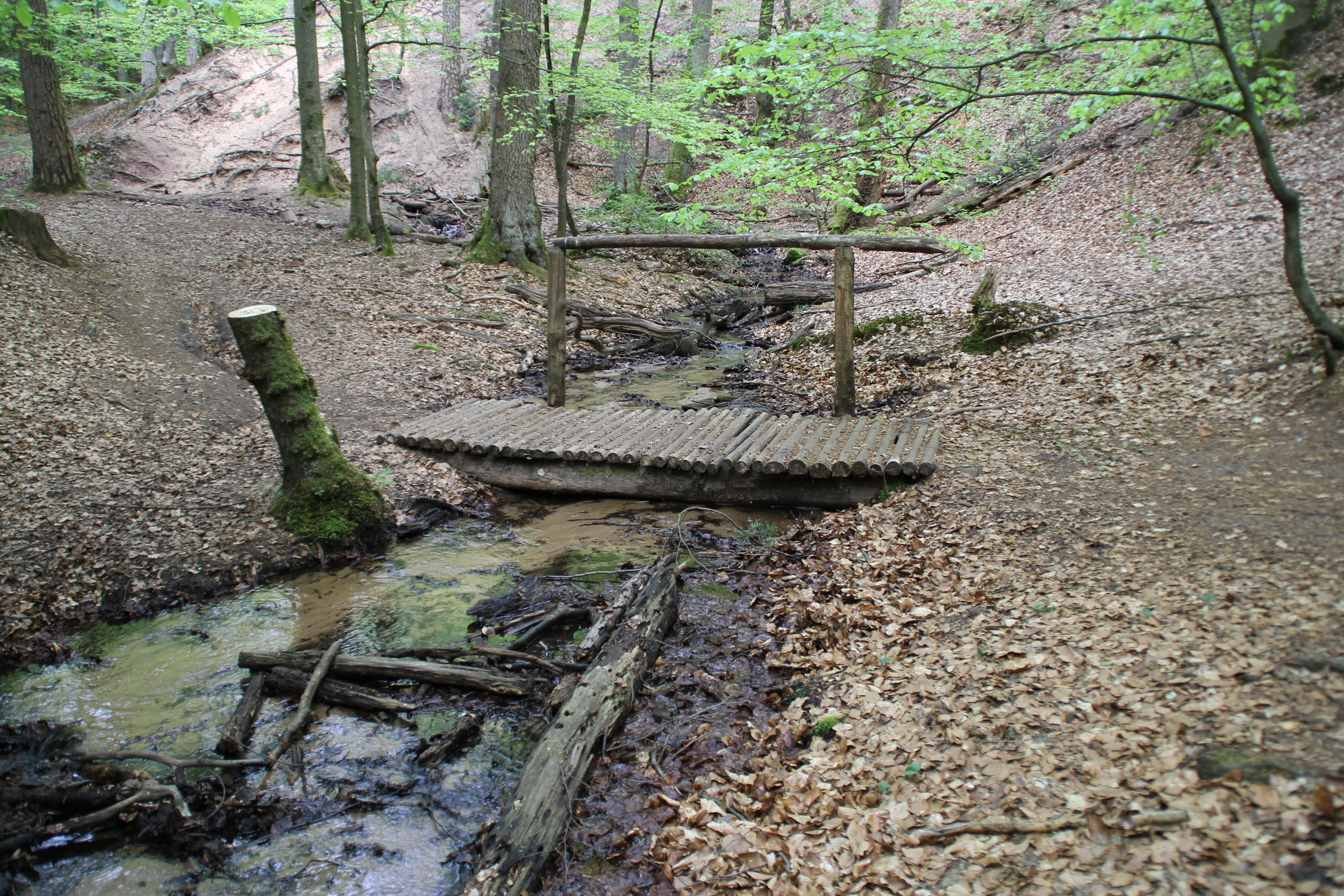
- The Einfallsgraben in the Alzenau city forest

Location
- Country: Germany
- State: Bavaria

Physical characteristics
- Mouth
  - coordinates: 50.1037°N 9.0527°E

Einfallsgraben is a small river of Bavaria, Germany. After a course of about 2 km it enters a sink near Alzenau.

== See also ==
- List of rivers of Bavaria
