= Farrnbach =

River in Germany

- The railway bridge over the Farrnbach at Burgfarrnbach

Location
- Country: Germany
- State: Bavaria

Physical characteristics
- Mouth
  - location: Regnitz
  - coordinates: 49.5009°N 10.9746°E
- Length: 23.6 km (14.7 mi)

Basin features
- Progression: Regnitz→ Main→ Rhine→ North Sea

Farrnbach is a river of Bavaria, Germany. It flows into the Regnitz near Fürth.

== See also ==
- List of rivers of Bavaria
