= Eichenwaldgraben =

River in Germany

Location
- Country: Germany
- State: Bavaria

Physical characteristics
- Mouth
  - location: Entengraben
  - coordinates: 49.3961°N 11.0286°E

Basin features
- Progression: Entengraben→ Rednitz→ Regnitz→ Main→ Rhine→ North Sea

Eichenwaldgraben is a small river of Bavaria, Germany. Near Nuremberg, it flows into the Entengraben, which itself is a tributary of the Rednitz.

== See also ==
- List of rivers of Bavaria
