= Unkenbach (Main) =

River in Germany

- The Unkenbach in Schwebheim

Location
- Country: Germany
- State: Bavaria

Physical characteristics
- Mouth
  - location: Main
  - coordinates: 49.9573°N 10.1793°E
- Length: 27.1 km (16.8 mi)

Basin features
- Progression: Main→ Rhine→ North Sea

Unkenbach (German pronunciation: [ˈʊŋkn̩bax]) is a river of Bavaria, Germany. It is a left tributary of the Main near Röthlein.

== See also ==
- List of rivers of Bavaria
