= Halsbach (river) =

River in Germany

- Mouth of the Halsbach

Location
- Country: Germany
- State: Bavaria

Physical characteristics
- Mouth
  - location: Alz
  - coordinates: 48°10′06″N 12°43′31″E
- Length: 13.1 km (8.1 mi)

Basin features
- Progression: Alz→ Inn→ Danube→ Black Sea

Halsbach (German pronunciation: [ˈhalsˌbax]) is a river of Bavaria, Germany. It flows into the Alz in Burgkirchen an der Alz.

== See also ==
- List of rivers of Bavaria
