= Umlaufgraben =

River in Germany

Location
- Country: Germany
- State: Bavaria

Physical characteristics
- Mouth
  - location: Auer Mühlbach
  - coordinates: 48.1067°N 11.5678°E

Umlaufgraben is a small river of Bavaria, Germany. It is a branch of the Auer Mühlbach, itself a branch of the Isar, in Munich.

== See also ==
- List of rivers of Bavaria
