= Häckergrundbach =

River in Germany

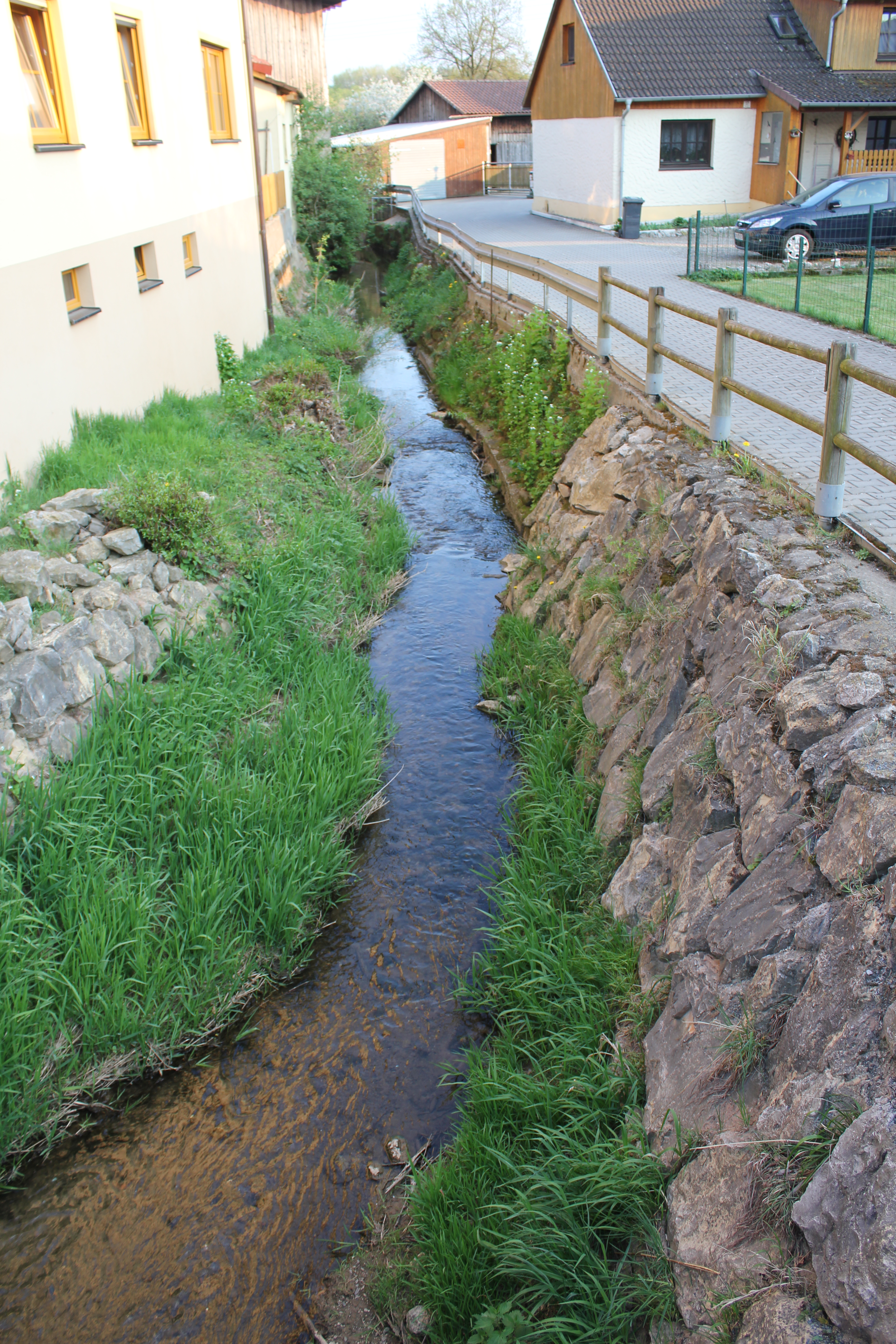
- The Häckergrundbach in the village Mainklein (part of Burgkunstadt)

Location
- Country: Germany
- States: Bavaria

Physical characteristics
- Mouth
  - location: Main
  - coordinates: 50.1233°N 11.2964°E

Basin features
- Progression: Main→ Rhine→ North Sea

Häckergrundbach is a small river of Bavaria, Germany. It flows into the Main near Burgkunstadt.

== See also ==
- List of rivers of Bavaria
