= Illach =

River in Germany

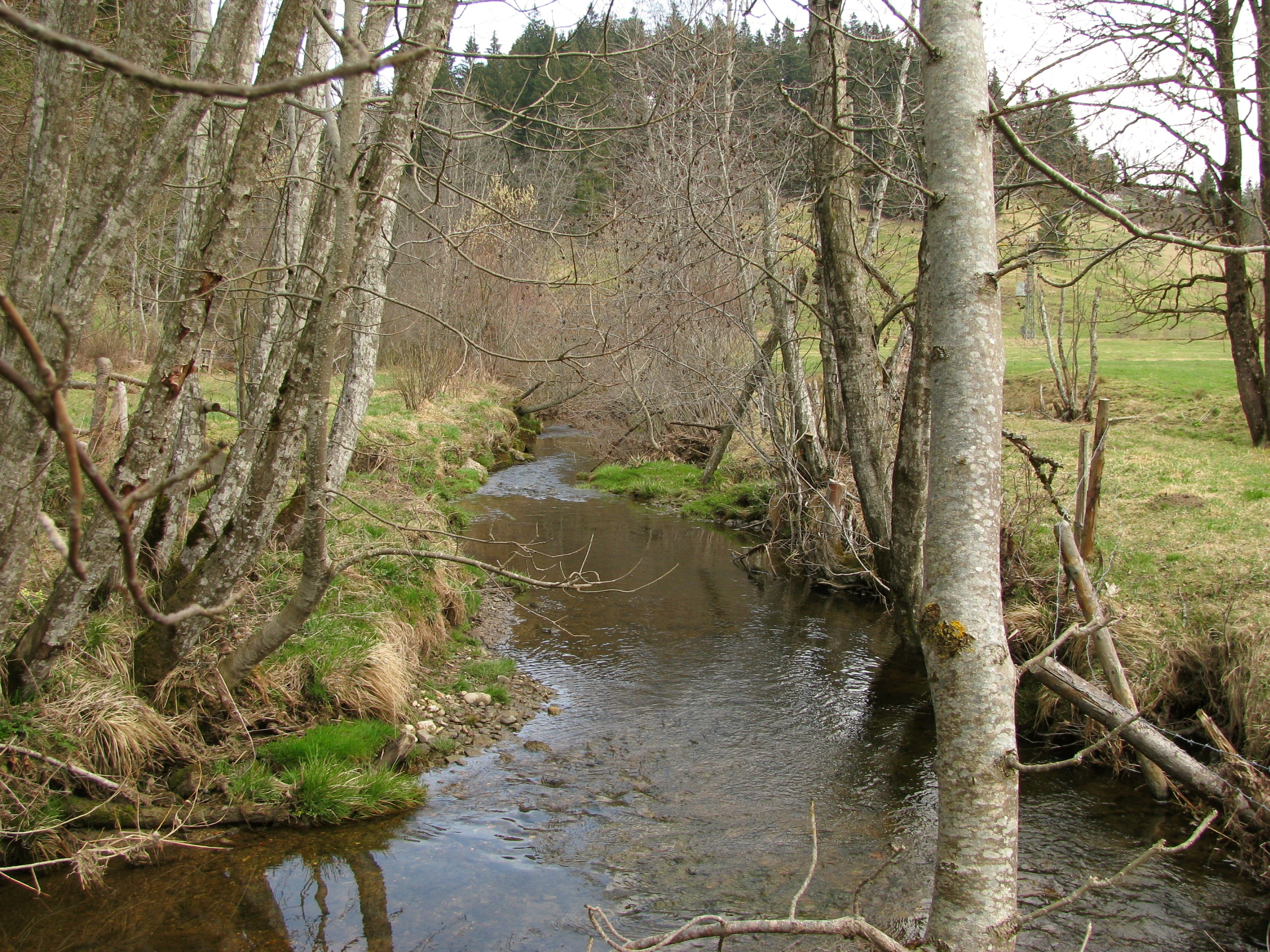
- The Illach at Wildsteig

Location
- Country: Germany
- State: Bavaria

Physical characteristics
- Mouth
  - location: Lech
  - coordinates: 47.7171°N 10.8295°E
- Length: 27.7 km (17.2 mi)

Basin features
- Progression: Lech→ Danube→ Black Sea

Illach is a river in Bavaria, Germany. It flows into the Lech near Steingaden.

== See also ==
- List of rivers of Bavaria
