= Kellbach =

River in Germany

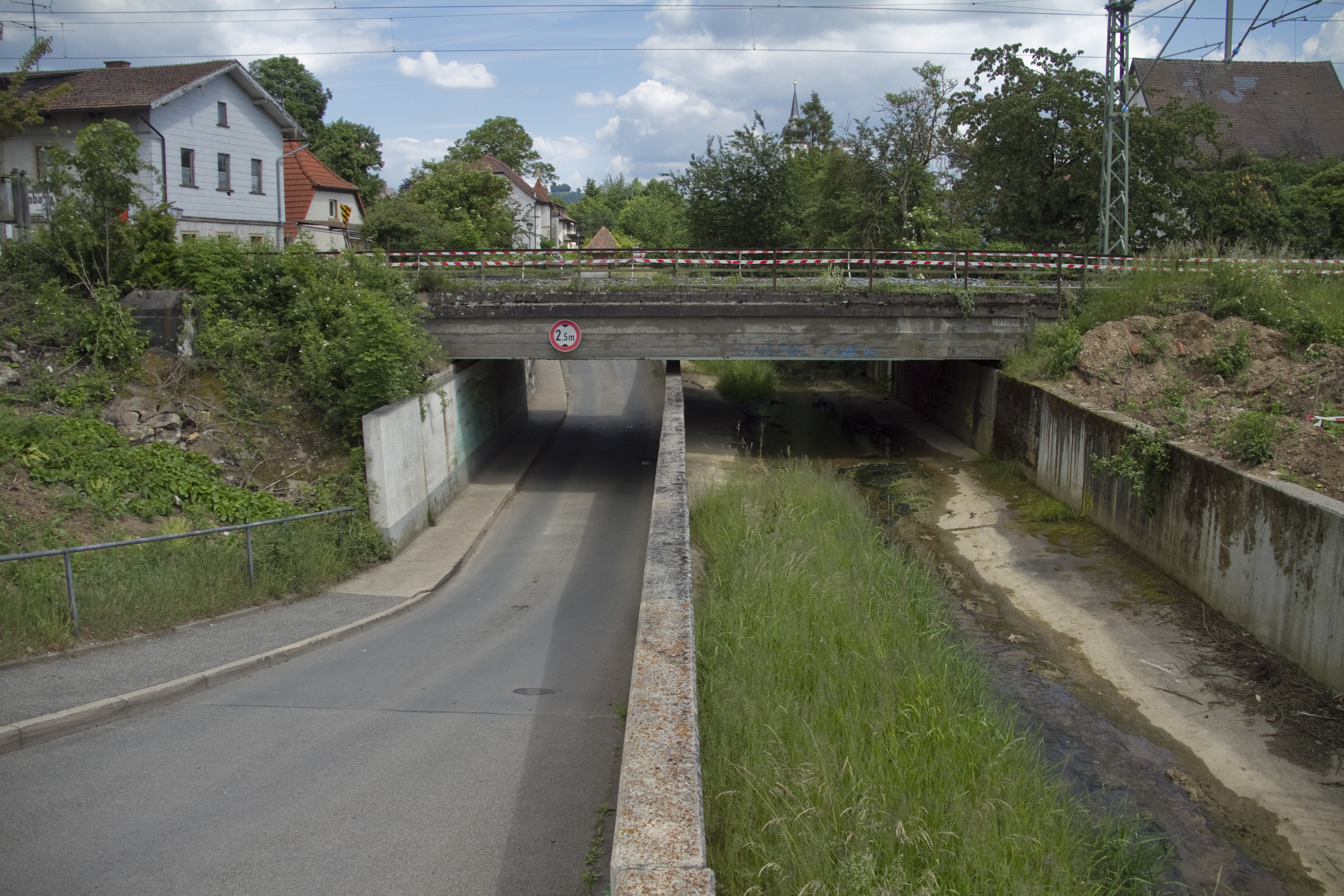
- The Kellbach in Ebensfeld

Location
- Country: Germany
- State: Bavaria

Physical characteristics
- Mouth
  - location: Main
  - coordinates: 50.0667°N 10.9479°E
- Length: 10.0 km (6.2 mi)

Basin features
- Progression: Main→ Rhine→ North Sea

Kellbach is a river of Bavaria, Germany. It flows into the Main in Ebensfeld.

== See also ==
- List of rivers of Bavaria
