= Röllbach (Main) =

River in Bavaria, Germany

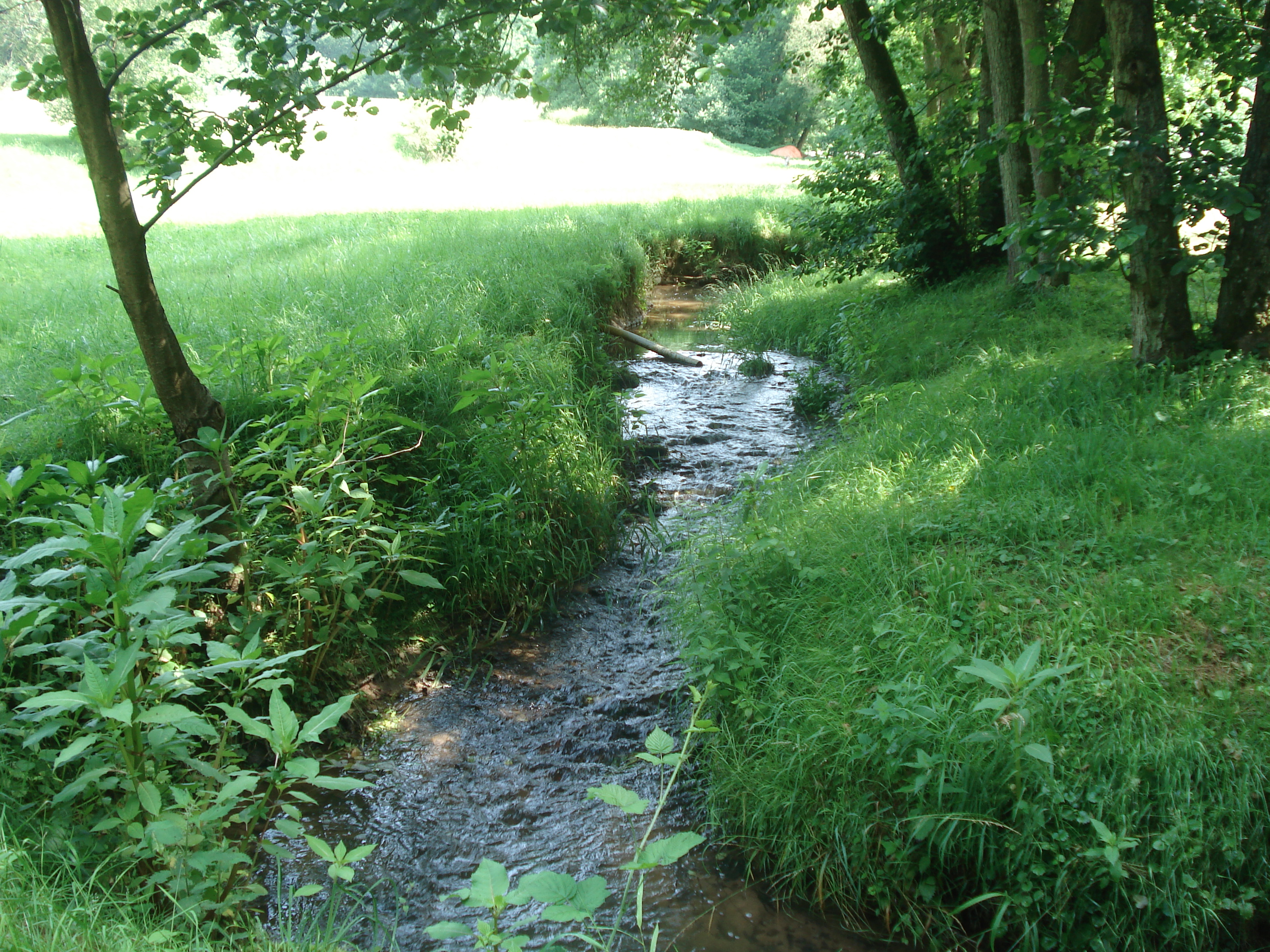
- The Röllbach at the mill Paradeismühle

Location
- Country: Germany
- State: Bavaria

Physical characteristics
- Mouth
  - location: Main
  - coordinates: 49.7665°N 9.1806°E
- Length: 8.1 km (5.0 mi)

Basin features
- Progression: Main→ Rhine→ North Sea

Röllbach (German pronunciation: [ˈʁœlbax]) is a river of Bavaria, Germany. It is a right tributary of the Main near Klingenberg am Main.

== See also ==
- List of rivers of Bavaria
