= Wieseth (river) =

River in Germany

- The Wieseth at Bechhofen

Location
- Country: Germany
- State: Bavaria

Physical characteristics
- Mouth
  - location: Altmühl
  - coordinates: 49.1703°N 10.6487°E
- Length: 31.8 km (19.8 mi)
- Basin size: 127 km^{2} (49 sq mi)

Basin features
- Progression: Altmühl→ Danube→ Black Sea

Wieseth (German pronunciation: [ˈviːzɛt]) is a river in Bavaria, Germany. It flows into the Altmühl near Ornbau.

== See also ==
- List of rivers of Bavaria
