= Schmerbach (Rauhe Ebrach) =

River in Germany

Location
- Country: Germany
- State: Bavaria

Schmerbach is a river in Bavaria, Germany. It is the right headstream of the Rauhe Ebrach.

== See also ==
- List of rivers of Bavaria
