= Reitbach =

River in Germany

Location
- Country: Germany
- States: Bavaria

Physical characteristics
- Source
  - location: branch of the Oberstjägermeisterbach in the Englischer Garten
  - coordinates: 48.1679°N 11.6083°E
- Mouth
  - location: back into the Oberstjägermeisterbach
  - coordinates: 48.1690°N 11.6104°E

Reitbach is a small river of Bavaria, Germany. It flows through the Englischer Garten in Munich. It is a short branch of the Oberstjägermeisterbach. The Oberstjägermeisterbach flows west and north of the Vogelinsel (lit. island of birds), the Reitbach south and east.

== See also ==
- List of rivers of Bavaria
