= Motschenbach =

River in Germany

Location
- Country: Germany
- State: Bavaria

Physical characteristics
- Mouth
  - location: Main
  - coordinates: 50.1058°N 11.3408°E

Basin features
- Progression: Main→ Rhine→ North Sea

Motschenbach is a river in Bavaria, Germany. It flows into the Main near Mainleus.

== See also ==
- List of rivers of Bavaria
