= Lausenbach (Ohře) =

River in Germany

Location
- Country: Germany
- States: Bavaria

Physical characteristics
- Mouth
  - coordinates: 50.1338°N 12.1097°E
- Length: 6.1 km (3.8 mi)

Basin features
- Progression: Ohře→ Elbe→ North Sea

Lausenbach is a river located in Bavaria, Germany. It flows into the Ohře near Selb.

== See also ==
- List of rivers of Bavaria
