= Gosenbach =

River of Bavaria, Germany

Location
- Country: Germany
- States: Bavaria

Physical characteristics
- Mouth
  - location: Red Main
  - coordinates: 49.8603°N 11.6218°E

Basin features
- Progression: Red Main→ Main→ Rhine→ North Sea

Gosenbach is a river of Bavaria, Germany. It flows into the Red Main near Creußen.

== See also ==
- List of rivers of Bavaria
