= Litzelbach =

River in Germany

Location
- Country: Germany
- States: Bavaria

Physical characteristics
- Mouth
  - location: Lohgraben
  - coordinates: 48.9619°N 12.1902°E

Basin features
- Progression: Geislinger Mühlbach→ Pfatter→ Danube→ Black Sea

Litzelbach is a small river of Bavaria, Germany. It flows into the Lohgraben, the upper course of the Geislinger Mühlbach, near Obertraubling.

== See also ==
- List of rivers of Bavaria
