= Zottelbach =

River in Germany

- Mouth of the Zottelbach

Location
- Country: Germany
- State: Bavaria

Physical characteristics
- Mouth
  - location: Saale
  - coordinates: 50°24′19″N 11°44′07″E

Basin features
- Progression: Saale→ Elbe→ North Sea

Zottelbach is a small river of Bavaria, Germany. It flows into the Saale near Issigau.

== See also ==
- List of rivers of Bavaria
