= Volkach (river) =

River in Germany

- The Volkach in Volkach, view downstream towards the south

Location
- Country: Germany
- State: Bavaria

Physical characteristics
- Mouth
  - location: Main
  - coordinates: 49.8548°N 10.2144°E
- Length: 30.2 km (18.8 mi)
- Basin size: 128 km^{2} (49 sq mi)

Basin features
- Progression: Main→ Rhine→ North Sea

Volkach (German pronunciation: [ˈfɔlkax]) is a river of Bavaria, Germany. It is a 30 kilometres (19 mi) long eastern, left tributary of the river Main near the town Volkach.

== See also ==
- List of rivers of Bavaria
