= Winzenhohler Bach =

River in Germany

- The Winzenhohler Bach at the monastery Schmerlenbach

Location
- Country: Germany
- State: Bavaria

Physical characteristics
- Mouth
  - location: Nonnenbach
  - coordinates: 49.9875°N 9.2287°E

Basin features
- Progression: Nonnenbach→ Aschaff→ Main→ Rhine→ North Sea

Winzenhohler Bach is a river in Bavaria, Germany. It is a headwater of the Nonnenbach near Hösbach.

== See also ==
- List of rivers of Bavaria
