= Wappach =

River in Germany

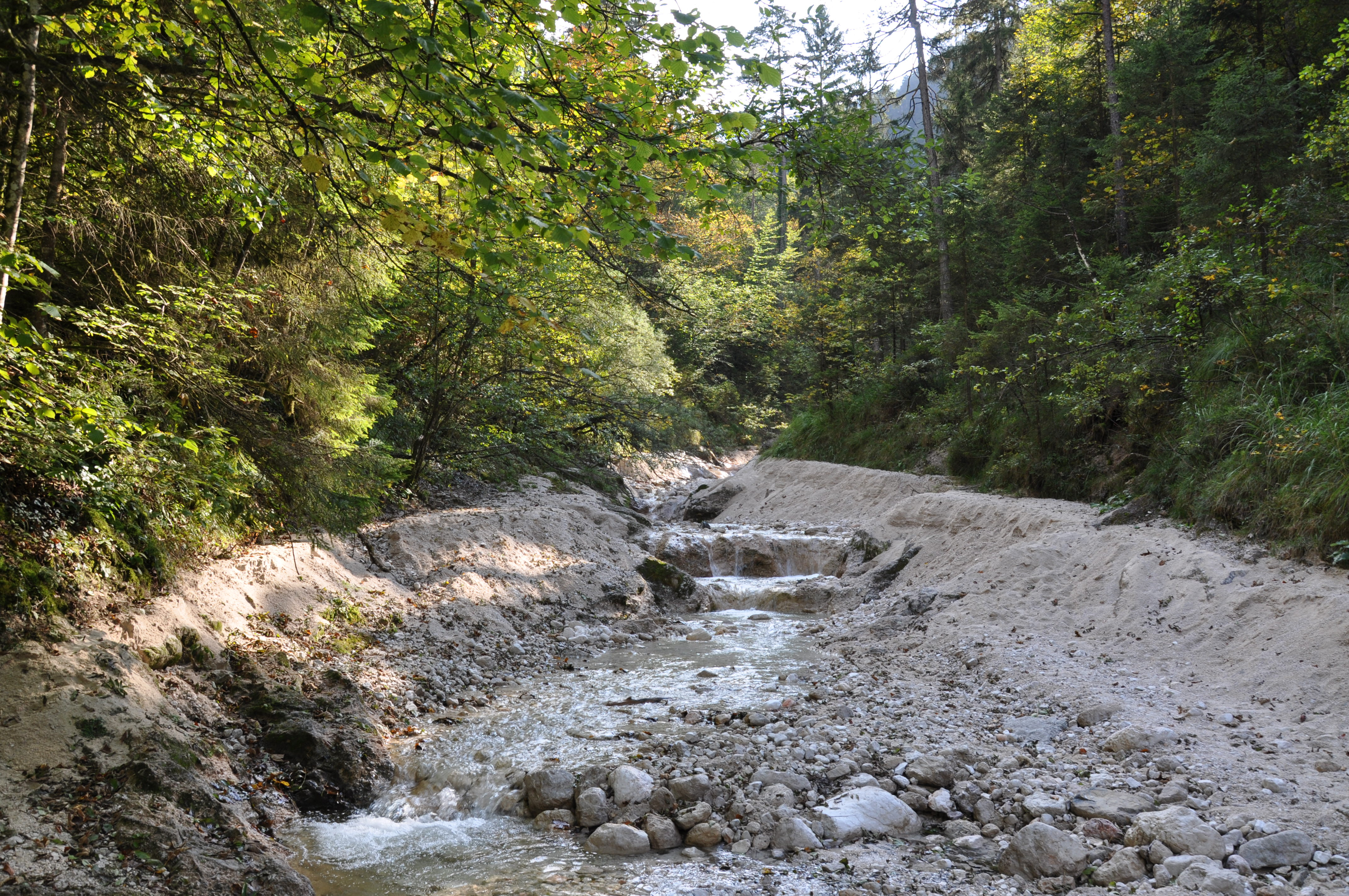

Location
- Country: Germany
- State: Bavaria

Physical characteristics
- Mouth
  - location: Saalach
  - coordinates: 47°43′03″N 12°52′25″E

Basin features
- Progression: Saalach→ Salzach→ Inn→ Danube→ Black Sea

Wappach is a small river of Bavaria, Germany. It flows into the Saalach in Bad Reichenhall.

== See also ==
- List of rivers of Bavaria
