= Laugna (river) =

River in Germany

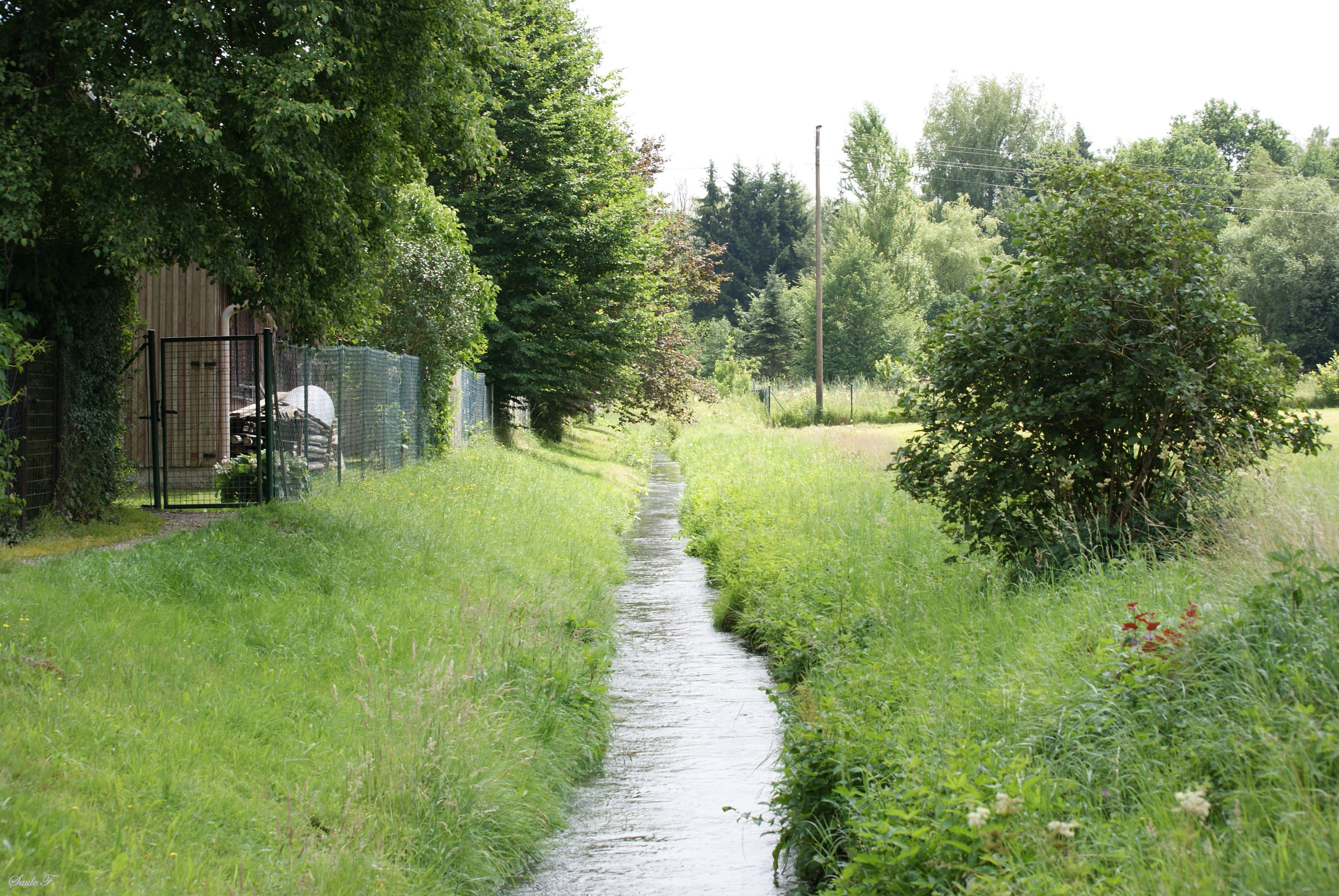
- The Laugna in Welden, view looking upstream

Location
- Country: Germany
- State: Bavaria

Physical characteristics
- Mouth
  - location: Zusam
  - coordinates: 48.5574°N 10.6869°E
- Length: 21.7 km (13.5 mi)

Basin features
- Progression: Zusam→ Danube→ Black Sea

Laugna is a river of Bavaria, Germany. It flows into the Zusam in Wertingen.

== See also ==
- List of rivers of Bavaria
