= Hensbach =

River in Germany

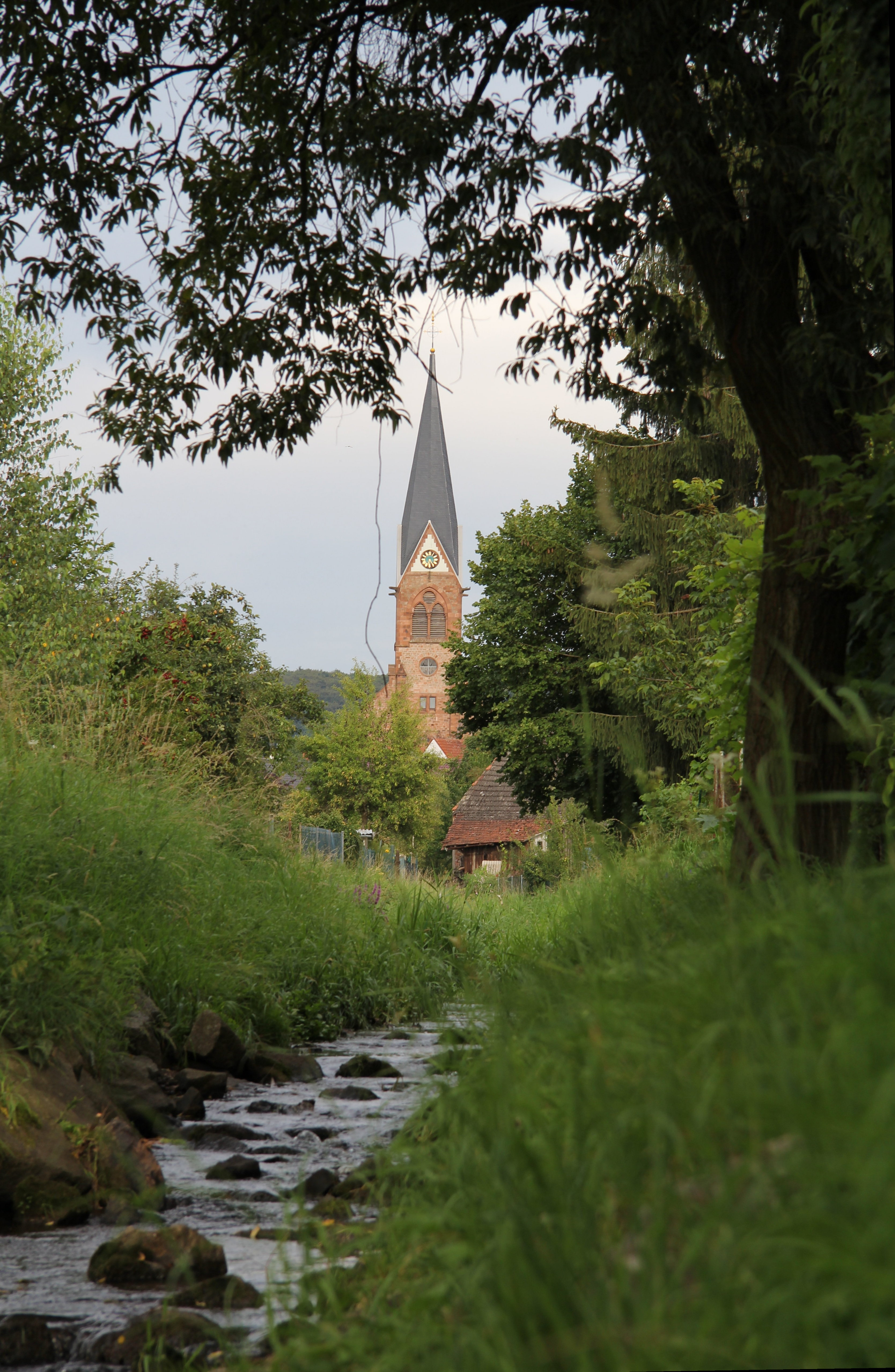
- The Hensbach in Schweinheim, a district of Aschaffenburg

Location
- Country: Germany
- States: Bavaria

Physical characteristics
- Mouth
  - location: Main
  - coordinates: 49.9608°N 9.1326°E

Basin features
- Progression: Main→ Rhine→ North Sea

Hensbach is a small river of Bavaria, Germany. It flows into the Main near Aschaffenburg.

== See also ==
- List of rivers of Bavaria
