= Störzelbach =

River in Germany

Location
- Country: Germany
- State: Bavaria

Physical characteristics
- Mouth
  - location: Altmühl
  - coordinates: 49.0360°N 10.8544°E

Basin features
- Progression: Altmühl→ Danube→ Black Sea

The Störzelbach is a river in the district Weißenburg-Gunzenhausen, Bavaria, Germany.

It is about nine kilometres (5.6 mi) long. It flows from the left and northeast into the Altmühl in Trommetsheim, a borough of Alesheim.

== See also ==
- List of rivers of Bavaria
