= Rohrach (Iller) =

River in Germany

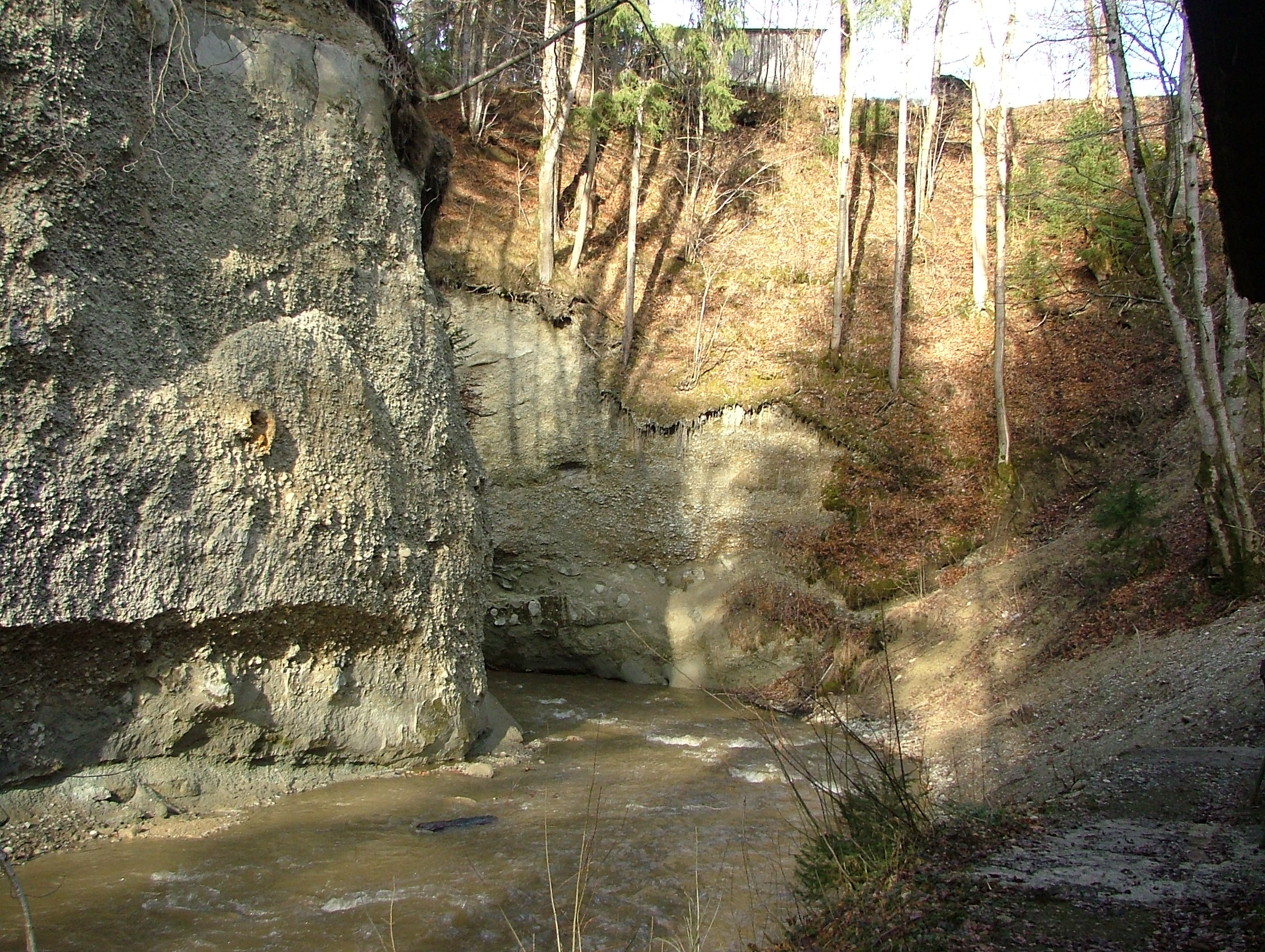
- scarp slopes of the gorge at Altusried-Staubers

Location
- Country: Germany
- State: Bavaria

Physical characteristics
- Mouth
  - location: Iller
  - coordinates: 47.8403°N 10.1919°E
- Length: 17.2 km (10.7 mi)

Basin features
- Progression: Iller→ Danube→ Black Sea

Rohrach is a river of Bavaria, Germany. It is a left tributary of the Iller east of Legau.

== See also ==
- List of rivers of Bavaria
