= Sindersbach =

River in Germany

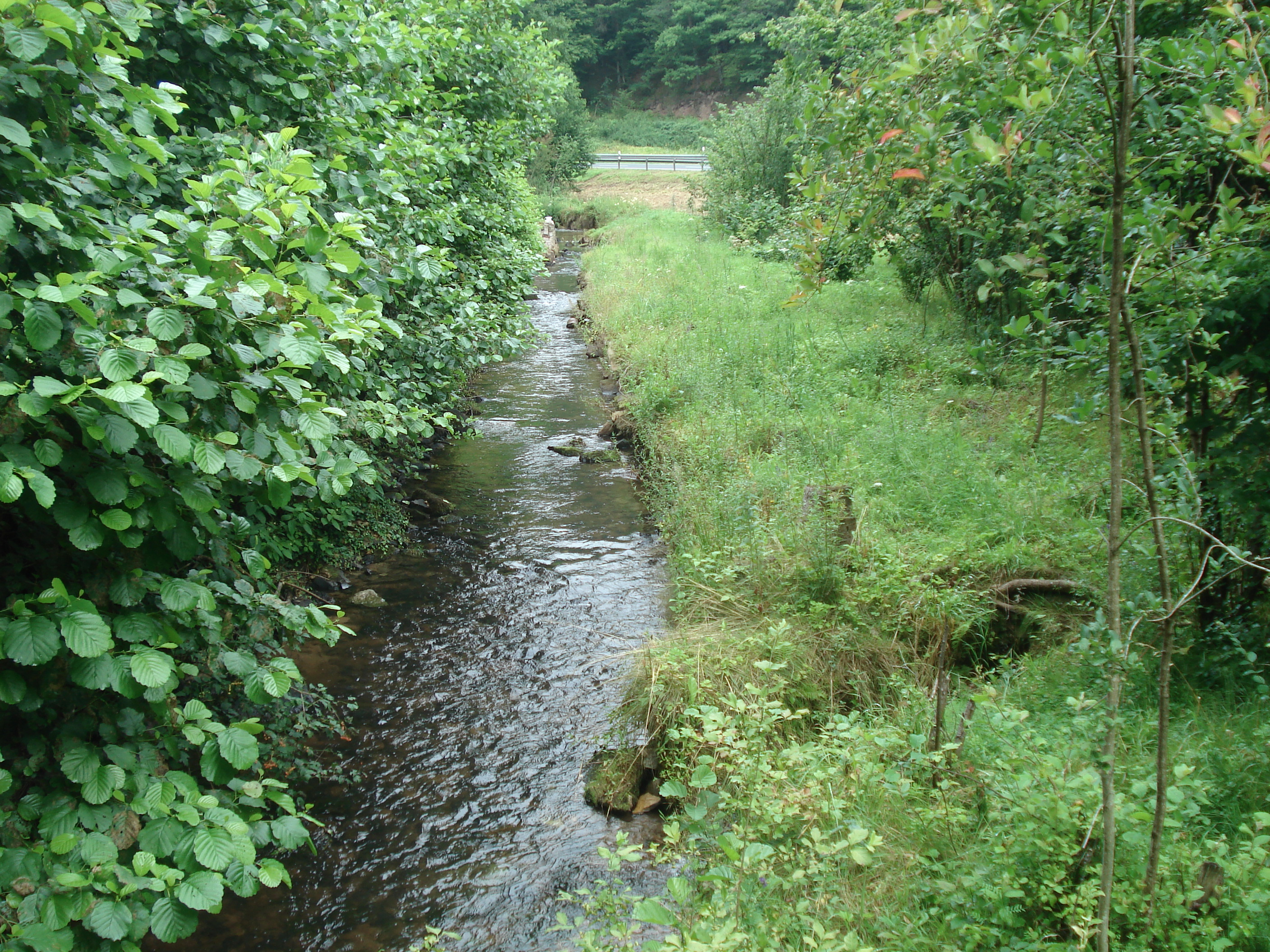
- The Sindersbach at the Obere Lohmühle

Location
- Country: Germany
- State: Bavaria

Physical characteristics
- Mouth
  - location: Main
  - coordinates: 50.0554°N 9.6423°E
- Length: 9.2 km (5.7 mi)

Basin features
- Progression: Main→ Rhine→ North Sea

Sindersbach is a river of Bavaria, Germany. It flows into the Main near Langenprozelten.

== See also ==
- List of rivers of Bavaria
