= Rieder Bach (Mindel) =

River in Germany

Location
- Country: Germany
- States: Bavaria

Physical characteristics
- Mouth
  - location: Mindel
  - coordinates: 48.3900°N 10.4303°E

Basin features
- Progression: Mindel→ Danube→ Black Sea

Rieder Bach is a river of Bavaria, Germany. It is a right tributary of the Mindel in Jettingen-Scheppach.

== See also ==
- List of rivers of Bavaria
