= Wannig (river) =

River in Germany

Location
- Country: Germany
- State: Bavaria

Physical characteristics
- Mouth
  - location: Lauer
  - coordinates: 50.2361°N 10.2383°E

Basin features
- Progression: Lauer→ Franconian Saale→ Main→ Rhine→ North Sea

Wannig is a river of Bavaria, Germany. It flows into the Lauer in Brünn, part of Münnerstadt.

== See also ==
- List of rivers of Bavaria
