= List of rivers of Bavaria =

A list of rivers of Bavaria, Germany:

== A ==
- Aalbach
- Abens
- Ach
- Afferbach
- Affinger Bach
- Ailsbach
- Aisch
- Aiterach
- Alpbach
- Alster
- Altmühl
- Alz
- Amper
- Anlauter
- Arbach
- Arbachgraben
- Aschaff
- Aschbach
- Attel
- Aubach, tributary of the Elsava
- Aubach, tributary of the Lohr
- Aubach, tributary of the Schwabach
- Auer Mühlbach
- Auerbach
- Aufseß
- Aura
- Aurach, tributary of the Rednitz
- Aurach, tributary of the Regnitz in Middle Franconia
- Aurach, tributary of the Regnitz in Upper Franconia
- Autenbach

== B ==
- Bachhaupter Laber
- Bächlesbach
- Bachmühlbach
- Bachquellengraben
- Bachwiesengraben
- Banzerbach
- Baunach
- Bayerbacher Bach
- Beibuschbach
- Berchtesgadener Ache
- Bessenbach
- Betzenbach
- Biber
- Biberbach
- Bibert
- Bina
- Blankenbach
- Bolgenach
- Bösbach
- Brandenberger Ache
- Braunau
- Breitach
- Breitbach
- Breitenbach
- Breitenbrunner Bach
- Breitenbrunner Laber
- Brend
- Brenz
- Brombach
- Bruchbach
- Bruckbach
- Brunnbach
- Brunnenbach
- Brunnthaler Quellbach
- Bubesheimer Bach
- Büchelbach
- Buxach
- Buxbach

== C ==
- Chamb
- Creußen

== D ==
- Dammbach
- Danube
- Deichselbach
- Dober
- Döbrabach (also called Döbra)
- Dobrach
- Dorfen
- Dörnsenbach
- Dühlbach
- Dürnbach
- Dürrschweinnaab

== E ==
- Ebrach, tributary of the Attel
- Ebrach, tributary of the Reiche Ebrach
- Ecknach
- Edelbach
- Effelder
- Egau
- Eger
- Ehenbach
- Eichbach
- Eichelbach
- Eichenberger Bach
- Eichenwaldgraben
- Eilenbach
- Einfallsgraben
- Eisbach
- Ellbach
- Els
- Elsava
- Engelbach
- Ens
- Entenbach
- Erf
- Erlau
- Erlbach
- Erlenbach, tributary of the Kahl
- Erlenbach, tributary of the Laufach
- Erlenbach, tributary of the Main
- Erlenbach, tributary of the Mindel
- Eschach
- Eßmühler Bach
- Eyach

== F ==
- Fahrbach
- Falkenbach
- Falkenseebach
- Farrnbach
- Faulbach
- Feisnitz
- Felchbach
- Feldkahl
- Fellach
- Festenbach
- Fichtelnaab
- Fichtenohe
- Fischbach, tributary of the Linder
- Fischbach, tributary of the Goldbach which discharges into the Pegnitz
- Fischbach, tributary of the Weiße Traun
- Fleutersbach
- Flinzbach
- Floß
- Flossach
- Folzbach
- Forchbach
- Forellenbach, tributary of the Eger
- Forellenbach, tributary of the Vils
- Forstgraben
- Franconian Rezat
- Franconian Saale
- Friedberger Ach
- Friesenbach
- Frommbach
- Füllbach

== G ==
- Gailach
- Gaißa
- Gallersbach
- Gauchsbach
- Geiselbach
- Geislbach
- Geißler
- Gennach
- Georgenbach
- Gersprenz
- Gießgraben, tributary of the Schutter
- Gießgraben, tributary of the Zusam
- Gießenbach
- Girnitz
- Gitzenbach
- Glasbach
- Glattbach
- Gleiritsch
- Glonn, tributary of the Amper
- Glonn, tributary of the Mangfall
- Glött
- Goldbach, tributary of the Aschaff
- Goldbach, tributary of the Kahl
- Goldbach, tributary of the Mangfall
- Goldbach, tributary of the Pegnitz
- Gollach
- Gosenbach
- Götzinger Achen
- Grabenbach
- Grambach
- Gregnitz
- Gröbenbach
- Großache (alternative name of the Tiroler Achen)
- Große Laber
- Große Ohe
- Große Vils
- Große Isar, a branch of the Isar in Munich
- Große Isar, a branch of the Isar in Landshut
- Großer Koserbach, upper course of the Koserbach
- Großwaldbach
- Grümpel
- Grundgraben
- Gründlach
- Gründleinsbach
- Güntersbach
- Günz
- Gunzenbach
- Gunzesrieder Ach
- Gutenbach
- Gutnach

== H ==
- Habersbach
- Hachinger Bach
- Häckergrundbach
- Hafenlohr
- Haggraben
- Haidenaab
- Hainerbach
- Halbammer
- Halblech
- Halsbach
- Hammerbach
- Harlachinger Quellbach
- Hartlaber
- Hasel
- Haselbach, tributary of the Günz
- Haselbach, tributary of the Kammel
- Haslochbach
- Hasslach
- Hemsbach
- Hengersberger Ohe
- Hensbach
- Herzbach
- Heubach
- Hinterer Troppelgraben
- Hitziger Lochgraben
- Högenbach
- Hohlbach
- Hohlenbach
- Höllbach
- Höllenbach
- Holzgraben
- Hombach
- Hösbach
- Huckelheimer Bach
- Hungerbach, tributary of the Altmühl
- Hungerbach, tributary of the Gennach
- Hüttenbach

== I ==
- Igelsbach
- Iglseebach
- Illach
- Ilm
- Ilz
- Irschinger Ach
- Isen
- Issigbach
- Ittlinger Bach
- Itz
- Iller
- Inn
- Isar

== J ==
- Jachen

== K ==
- Kahl
- Kainach
- Kalkach
- Kalte Moldau
- Kaltenbach, headstream of the Elsava
- Kaltenbach, tributary of the Mangfall
- Kaltenmühlbach
- Kalterbach
- Kammel
- Karbach
- Katzbach
- Kellbach
- Kertelbach
- Kessel
- Kieferbach
- Kinsach
- Kirchengrundbach
- Kirnach
- Klafferbach
- Klausbach
- Kleinaschaff
- Kleine Ammer
- Kleine Donau
- Kleine Isar, a branch of the Isar in Munich
- Kleine Isar, a branch of the Isar in Landshut
- Kleine Kahl
- Kleine Laber
- Kleine Ohe, tributary of the Danube
- Kleine Ohe, headwater of the Ilz
- Kleine Paar
- Kleine Sinn
- Kleine Vils
- Kleine Weisach
- Kleiner Koserbach
- Kleinlaudenbach
- Klingenbach
- Klosterbach
- Klosterbeurener Bach
- Kohlbach
- Kollbach
- Königsseer Ache
- Konstanzer Ach
- Köschinger Bach
- Koser, alternative name of the Koserbach
- Koserbach
- Kötz
- Krähenbach
- Krebsbach, tributary of the Itz
- Krebsbach, tributary of the Kahl
- Krebsbach, tributary of the Paar
- Krebsbach, tributary of the Rodach
- Krebsbach, tributary of the Steinach
- Krebsbach, tributary of the Günz
- Kremnitz, headwater of the Kronach
- Krombach
- Kronach, tributary of the Haßlach
- Kronach, tributary of the White Main
- Krumbach
- Krumbächlein
- Kühruhgraben
- Kupferbach
- Kürnach

== L ==
- Lamitz
- Langbach
- Langwieder Bach
- Lanzenbach
- Lappach
- Laubersbach
- Lauer
- Laufach
- Laugna
- Lausenbach, tributary of the Ohře (Eger)
- Lauter, tributary of the Baunach
- Lauter, tributary of the Itz
- Lauterach
- Lech
- Leckner Ach
- Leibi
- Leiblach
- Leinleiter
- Leitenbach
- Leitzach
- Leuchsenbach
- Lillach
- Lindenbach
- Linder
- Litzelbach
- Lohmgraben
- Lohr
- Lohrbach
- Loisach
- Loquitz
- Luhe
- Lüßbach

== M ==
- Mailinger Bach
- Main
- Maisach
- Maisinger Bach
- Mangfall
- Maria-Einsiedel-Bach
- Maria-Einsiedel-Mühlbach
- Maß
- Matzbach
- Mauerner Bach
- Memminger Ach
- Menach
- Michelbach
- Mies
- Milz
- Mindel
- Mistel
- Mittelbühlgraben
- Mitternacher Ohe
- Mittlere Ebrach
- Moosach
- Moosbach
- Motschenbach
- Muglbach
- Mühlbach, tributary of the Altmühl
- Mühlbach, tributary of the Gleiritsch
- Mühlbach, a branch of the Isar in Munich
- Mühlbach, tributary of the Mangfall
- Mümling
- Münsterer Alte
- Murach
- Mutterbach

== N ==
- Naab
- Naifer Bach
- Nassach
- Näßlichbach
- Nau
- Neualmbach
- Neufnach
- Neuwiesenbach
- Nonnenbach, tributary to the Aschaff
- Nonnenbach, tributary of Lake Constance
- Northern Regnitz

== O ==
- Obere Argen
- Oberer Wehrbach
- Oberschurbach
- Oberstjägermeisterbach
- Ohlenbach
- Ohře
- Ölschnitz, headstream of the Red Main
- Ölschnitz, headstream of the White Main
- Omersbach
- Osterbach
- Östliche Günz
- Ostrach
- Otterbach, tributary of the Danube
- Otterbach, tributary of the Klosterbeurener Bach
- Ottmarsfelder Graben
- Oybach

== P ==
- Paar
- Partnach
- Pegnitz
- Perlenbach
- Pfatter
- Pfettrach
- Pfreimd
- Pleichach
- Premich
- Prien
- Proviantbach
- Pulverbach
- Püttlach

== Q ==
- Querbach
- Quirinbach

== R ==
- Ramsauer Ache
- Ranna
- Rannach
- Ransbach
- Rappach
- Rauhe Ebrach
- Red Main
- Rednitz
- Regen
- Regnitz
- Reiche Ebrach
- Reichenbach
- Reitbach
- Rengersbrunner Bach
- Reschbach
- Rieder Bach, tributary of the Mindel
- Rieder Bach, tributary of the Rinchnach
- Rinchnach
- Rinchnacher Ohe
- Ringelbach
- Rißbach
- Rodach, tributary of the Itz
- Rodach, tributary of the Main
- Röderbach, tributary of the Aschaff
- Rohrach, tributary of the Iller
- Rohrach, tributary of the Wörnitz
- Rohrbach, tributary of the Felchbach
- Rohrbach, tributary of the Tauber
- Rohrgraben
- Röllbach
- Rosenbach
- Röslau
- Rote Traun
- Roter Graben
- Roth, tributary of the Danube
- Roth, tributary of the Rednitz
- Roth, tributary of the Zusam
- Röthbach
- Röthelbach, tributary of the Saalach
- Röthelbach, tributary of the Traun
- Röthen
- Rott, tributary of the Ammersee
- Rott, a tributary of the Inn near Neuhaus am Inn, opposite of Schärding
- Rott, a tributary of the Inn at Rott am Inn
- Rottach, right tributary of the Iller at the boundary between the municipalities Sulzberg and Rettenberg
- Rottach, left tributary of the Iller at Kempten
- Rottach, tributary of the Tegernsee
- Rückersbach
- Ruhgraben

== S ==
- Saalach
- Saale
- Sagwasser
- Sailaufbach
- Salzach
- Sälzerbach
- Salzersgraben
- Sandrach
- Sauerbach
- Saußbach
- Schambach
- Schandtauber
- Schießbach
- Schlangenbach, tributary of the Altmühl
- Schlangenbach, tributary of the Regnitz
- Schlierach
- Schlossauer Ohe
- Schloßgrundgraben
- Schmerbach
- Schmerlenbach
- Schmutter
- Schnaittach
- Schneppenbach
- Schönach
- Schondra
- Schorgast
- Schutter
- Schwabach, tributary of the Rednitz
- Schwabach, tributary of the Regnitz
- Schwabinger Bach
- Schwabinger Eisbach
- Schwarzach, tributary of the Altmühl
- Schwarzach, tributary of the Main
- Schwarzach, tributary of the Naab
- Schwarzach, tributary of the Rednitz
- Schwarzbach, tributary of the Günz
- Schwarzbach, tributary of the Laufach
- Schwarzbach, tributary of the Reschbach
- Schwarzbach, tributary of the Saalach
- Schwarze Laber
- Schwarzenbach, tributary of the Obere Argen
- Schwarzenbach, tributary of the Weißach
- Schwarzlofer
- Schwebelbach
- Schweinnaab
- Schwesnitz
- Schörgenbach
- Schützbach
- Seebach, tributary of the Isar
- Seebach, headwater of the Laufach
- Seebach, tributary of the Rhine–Main–Danube Canal
- Seetraun
- Seibertsbach
- Selbbach
- Selbitz
- Sempt
- Siebenbrunner Bächl
- Siechenbach
- Silberbach
- Sims
- Sindersbach
- Singold
- Sinn
- Sittenbach
- Söllbach
- Sommerkahl
- Speckkahl
- Starzlach, tributary of the Breitach
- Starzlach, tributary of the Ostrach
- Starzlach, tributary of the Wertach
- Steinach
- Steinbach, tributary of the Hafenlohr
- Steinbach, tributary of the Kahl
- Steinbach, tributary of the Main
- Steinbach, tributary of the Paar
- Steinbach, tributary of the Reichenbach
- Steinbach, tributary of the Saalach
- Sterzenbach
- Stickelgraben
- Stillach
- Stoißer Ache
- Störzelbach
- Streitmühlbach
- Streu, tributary of the Franconian Saale
- Streu, tributary of the Kahl
- Strogen
- Southern Regnitz
- Sulz
- Sulzach
- Sulzbach, tributary of the Main
- Sulzbach, tributary of the Rott
- Sur
- Swabian Rezat

== T ==
- Tannbach
- Tauber
- Teisnach
- Teuschnitz
- Thierbach
- Thosbach
- Thulba
- Thüringische Muschwitz
- Tiergartenbach
- Tiroler Achen
- Töpener Bach or Töpenbach – alternative name of the Kupferbach
- Traun
- Trebgast
- Treppengraben
- Trettach
- Trubach
- Truppach

== U ==
- Umlaufgraben
- Unkenbach
- Untere Argen
- Untere Steinach
- Unterer Hösbach
- Unterer Wehrbach
- Ussel

== V ==
- Vils, tributary of the Danube
- Vils, tributary of the Lech
- Vils, tributary of the Naab
- Volkach
- Vorbach
- Vorderer Troppelgraben

== W ==
- Wachsteiner Bach
- Waizenbach
- Waldnaab
- Walkershöfer Weihergraben
- Walkerszeller Bach
- Wannig
- Wappach
- Warme Steinach
- Wehmig
- Weibersbach, tributary of the Kahl in Michelbach, a district of Alzenau
- Weibersbach, tributary of the Kahl in Schimborn, a district of Mömbris
- Weihergraben, tributary of the Altmühl
- Weihergraben, tributary of the Zipser Mühlbach
- Weilach
- Weiler Ach
- Weimersheimer Bach
- Weismain
- Weißach, in the German and Austrian Alps, tributary of the Bregenzer Ach
- Weißach, tributary of the Tegernsee
- Weißbach, tributary of the Saalach, its source at the Dreisesselberg, Lattengebirge
- Weißbach, tributary of the Saalach, in the areas of the municipalities Inzell and Schneizlreuth
- Weiße Laber
- Weizenbach
- Weiße Traun
- Wellenbach
- Welzbach, tributary of the Main
- Welzbach, tributary of the Tauber
- Wern
- Wertach
- Westerbach, tributary of the Hasel
- Westerbach, tributary of the Kahl
- Westernach
- Westliche Günz
- White Main
- Wiesau
- Wiesbach, tributary of the Lech
- Wiesbach, tributary of the Rott that is a tributary of the Inn near Neuhaus am Inn
- Wiesbüttgraben
- Wiesent, tributary of the Danube
- Wiesent, tributary of the Regnitz
- Wieseth
- Wilde Rodach
- Windach
- Winterswiesbach
- Winzenhohler Bach
- Wissinger Laber
- Wohnroder Bach
- Wolfach
- Wolfsbach
- Wolfsteiner Ohe
- Wondreb
- Wörnitz
- Wörthbach
- Würm

== Z ==
- Zandtbach
- Zeegenbach
- Zeiselbach
- Zeitlbach
- Zeller Bach, tributary of the Isar
- Zeller Bach, tributary of the Kressenbach, the upper course of the Memminger Ach
- Zenn
- Zentbach
- Zeubach
- Zipser Mühlbach
- Zottelbach
- Zusam
