= Proviantbach =

Canal in Germany

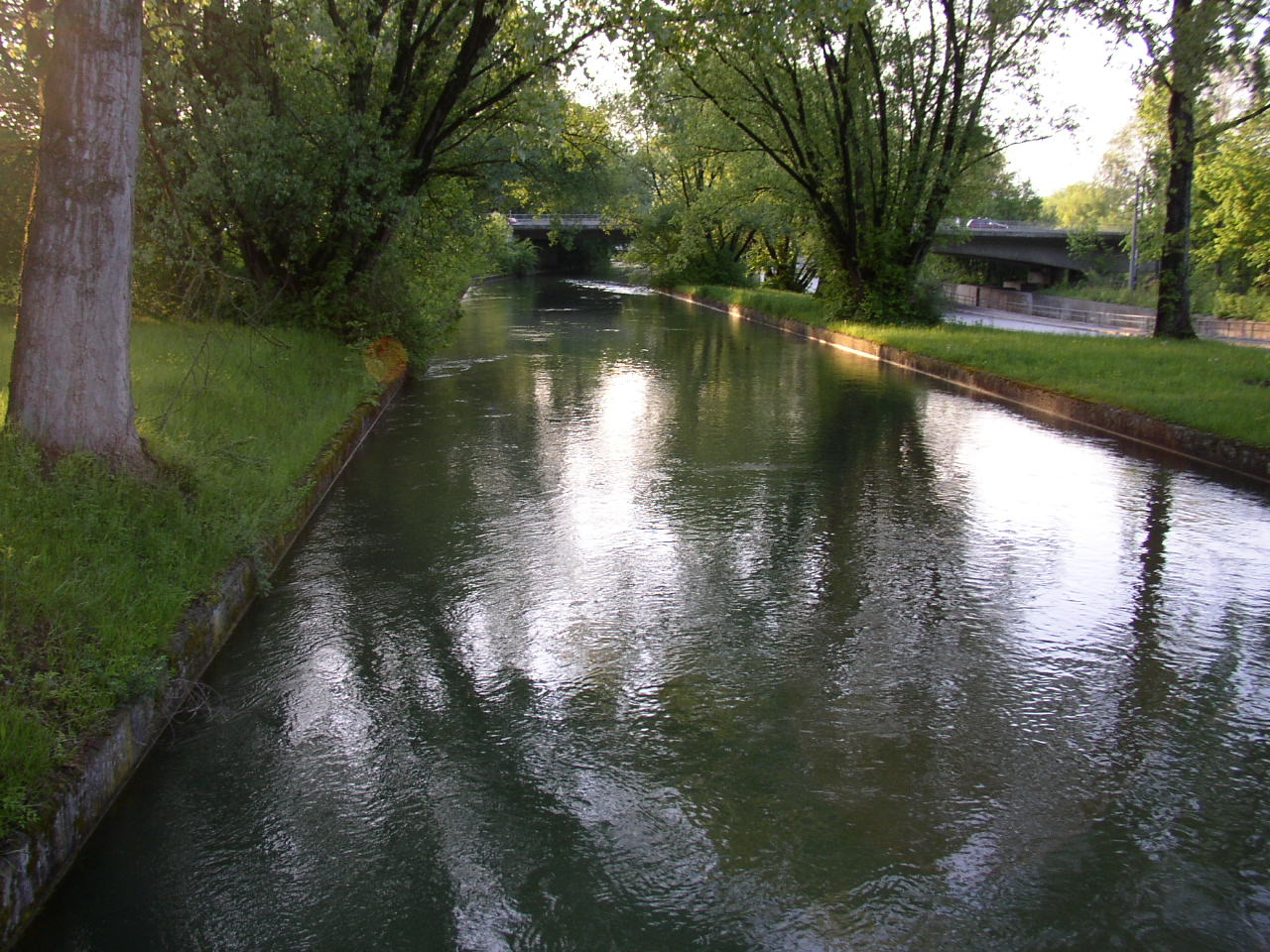
- The Proviantbach near MAN bridge in Augsburg, Germany
- Interactive map of Proviantbach

Specifications
- Length: 4.4 km (2.7 miles)

Geography
- End point: Lech (48.4025°N 10.8892°E)

Proviantbach is a 4.4 km long canal, parallel to the river Lech in Augsburg, Bavaria, Germany.

== See also ==
- List of rivers of Bavaria
