= Lohmgraben =

River in Germany

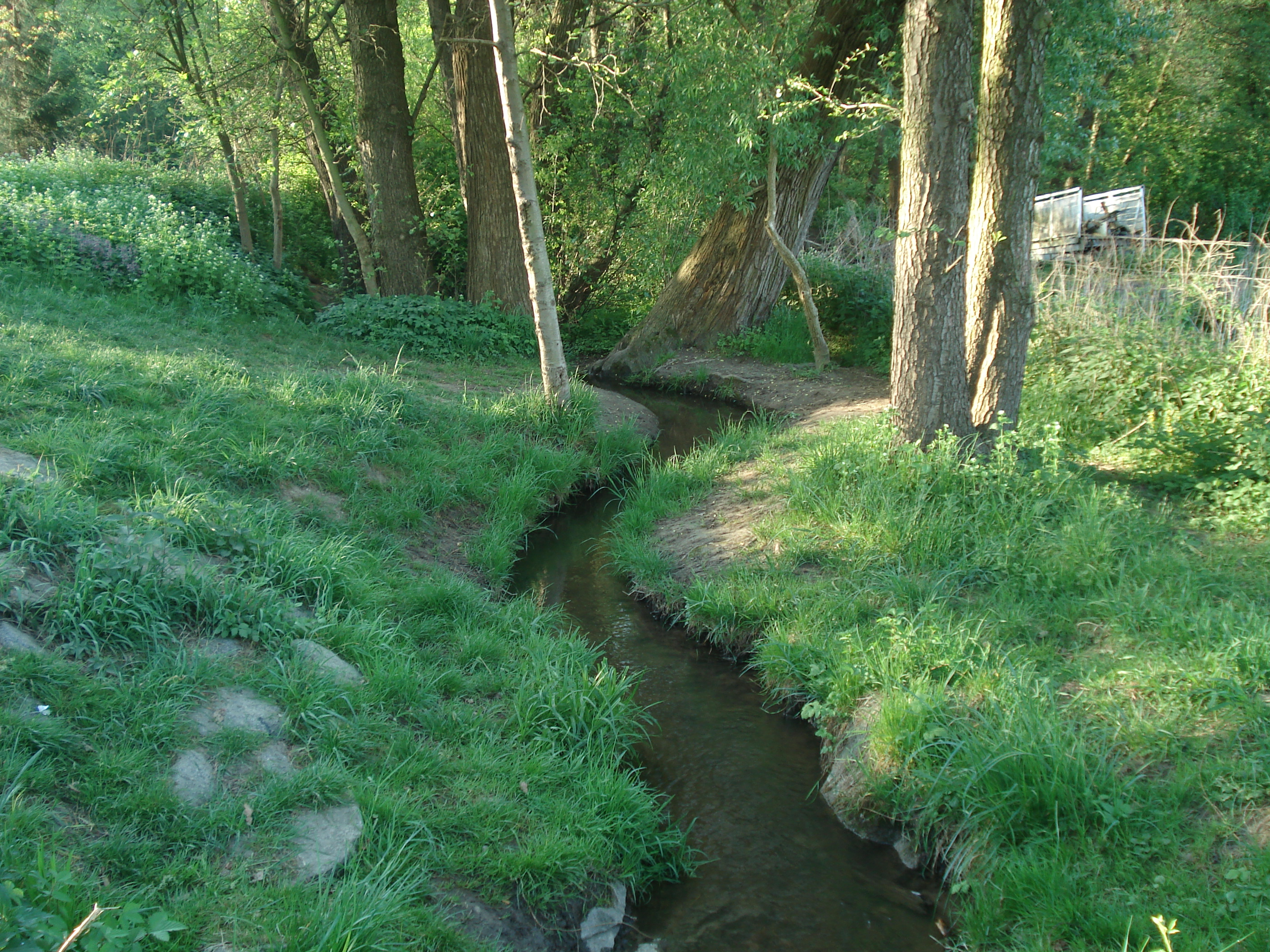
- The Lohmgraben in Damm (a district of Aschaffenburg)

Location
- Country: Germany
- States: Bavaria

Physical characteristics
- Mouth
  - location: Aschaff
  - coordinates: 49.9878°N 9.1280°E

Basin features
- Progression: Aschaff→ Main→ Rhine→ North Sea

Lohmgraben is a small river of Bavaria, Germany. It is formed by the confluence of two small streams: Fahrbach and Grundgraben. It flows into the Aschaff near Aschaffenburg.

== See also ==
- List of rivers of Bavaria
