= Bubesheimer Bach =

River in Germany

Location
- Country: Germany
- State: Bavaria

Physical characteristics
- Mouth
  - location: Günz
  - coordinates: 48.4512°N 10.2693°E

Basin features
- Progression: Günz→ Danube→ Black Sea

Bubesheimer Bach is a small river of Bavaria, Germany. It is a left tributary of the Günz in Günzburg.

== Conservation ==
Sections of the Bubesheimer Bach are designated as a protected landscape feature (German: geschützter Landschaftsbestandteil). In 2010, a conservation and development plan was commissioned for the stream. The lower course is described as a near-natural, meandering habitat that supports amphibians and two species of damselfly. To address threats such as shrub encroachment and invasive plant species, conservation measures including shrub removal and mowing have been carried out on municipally owned land.

== See also ==
- List of rivers of Bavaria
