= Wachsteiner Bach =

River in Germany

Location
- Country: Germany
- State: Bavaria

Physical characteristics
- Mouth
  - location: Altmühl
  - coordinates: 49.0712°N 10.8094°E

Basin features
- Progression: Altmühl→ Danube→ Black Sea

Wachsteiner Bach is a small river of Bavaria, Germany. It flows into the Altmühl near Windsfeld.

== See also ==
- List of rivers of Bavaria
