= Pfettrach =

River in Germany

Location
- Country: Germany
- State: Bavaria

Physical characteristics
- Mouth
  - location: Kleine Isar
  - coordinates: 48.5495°N 12.1684°E
- Length: 23.0 km (14.3 mi)

Basin features
- Progression: Isar→ Danube→ Black Sea

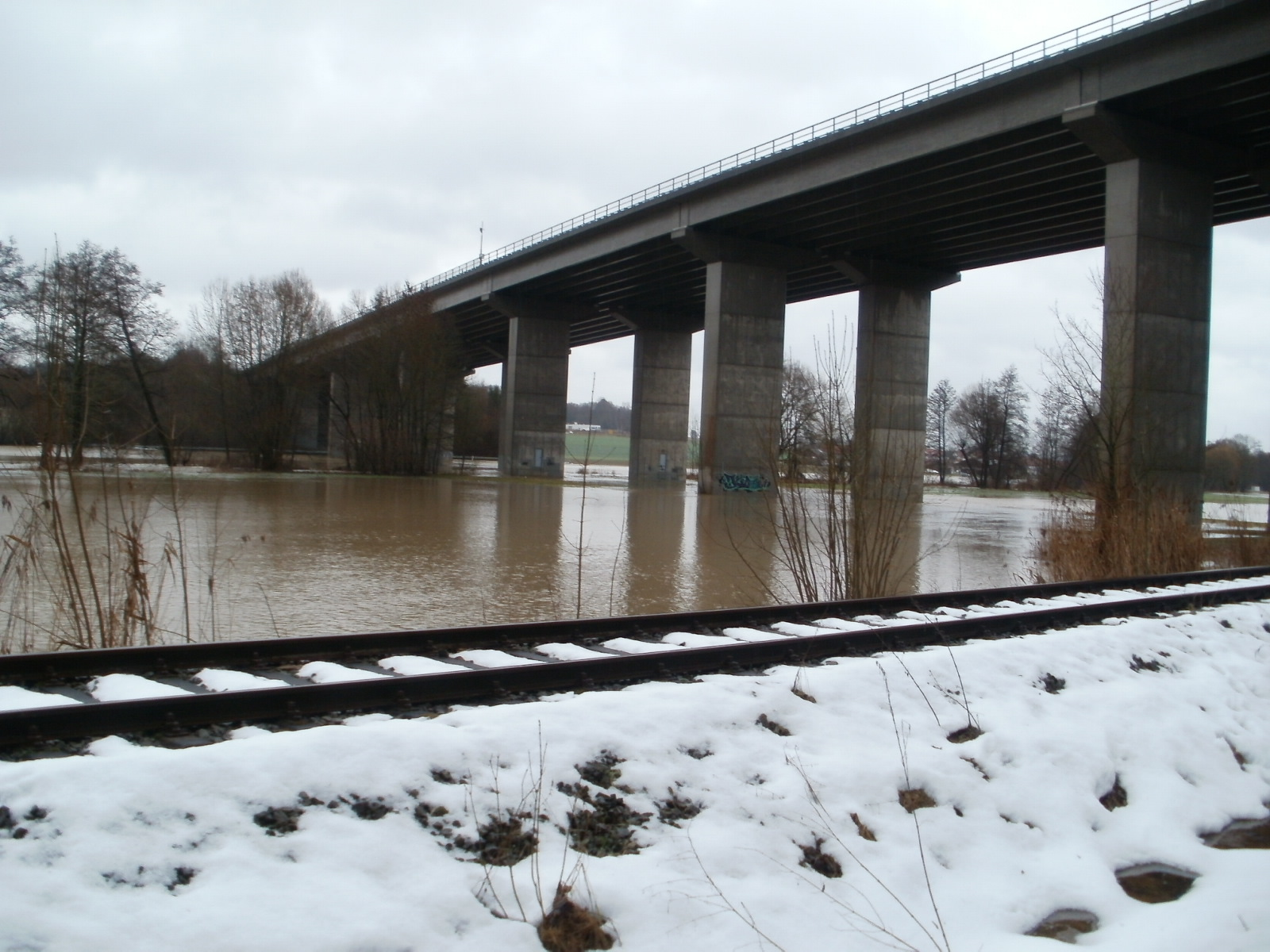
Flooding of the Pfettrach at the Highway Bridge, 2011

Pfettrach is a river of Bavaria, Germany. It flows into the Kleine Isar, a branch of the Isar, in Landshut.

== See also ==
- List of rivers of Bavaria
