= Sulzbach (Rott) =

River in Germany

Location
- Country: Germany
- State: Bavaria

Physical characteristics
- Mouth
  - location: Near Neuhaus am Inn into the Rott
  - coordinates: 48.4530°N 13.4067°E

Basin features
- Progression: Rott→ Inn→ Danube→ Black Sea

Sulzbach (German pronunciation: [ˈzʊltsbax]) is a river of Bavaria, Germany. It is a left tributary of the Rott near Neuhaus am Inn.

== See also ==
- List of rivers of Bavaria
