= Leitenbach =

River in Germany

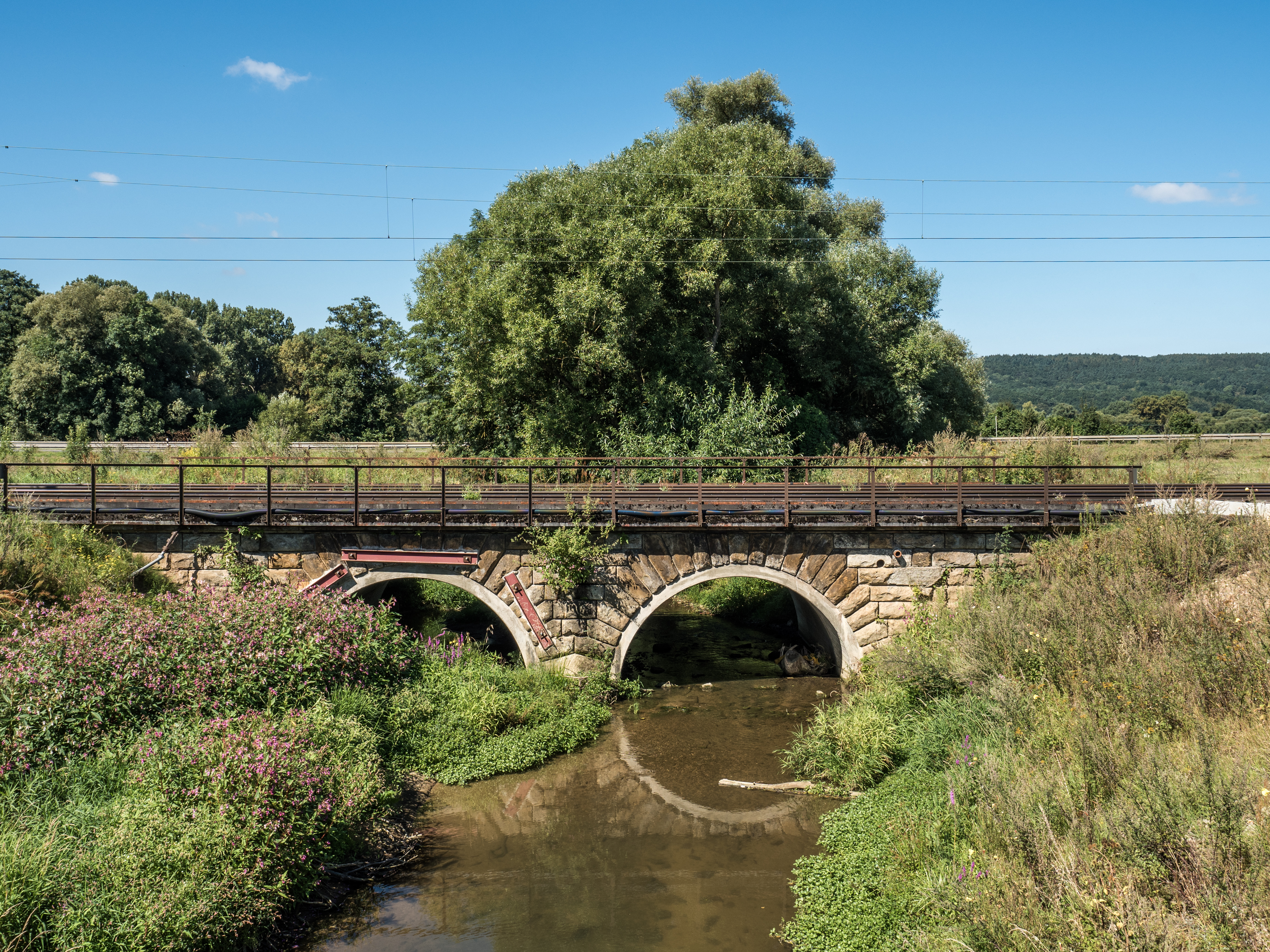
- The Leitenbach at a railway bridge near Hallstadt in Upper Franconia

Location
- Country: Germany
- State: Bavaria

Physical characteristics
- Mouth
  - location: Main
  - coordinates: 49.9437°N 10.8744°E
- Length: 24.6 km (15.3 mi)

Basin features
- Progression: Main→ Rhine→ North Sea

Leitenbach is a river of Bavaria, Germany. It flows into the Main near Kemmern.

== See also ==
- List of rivers of Bavaria
