= Mühlbach (Altmühl) =

River in Germany

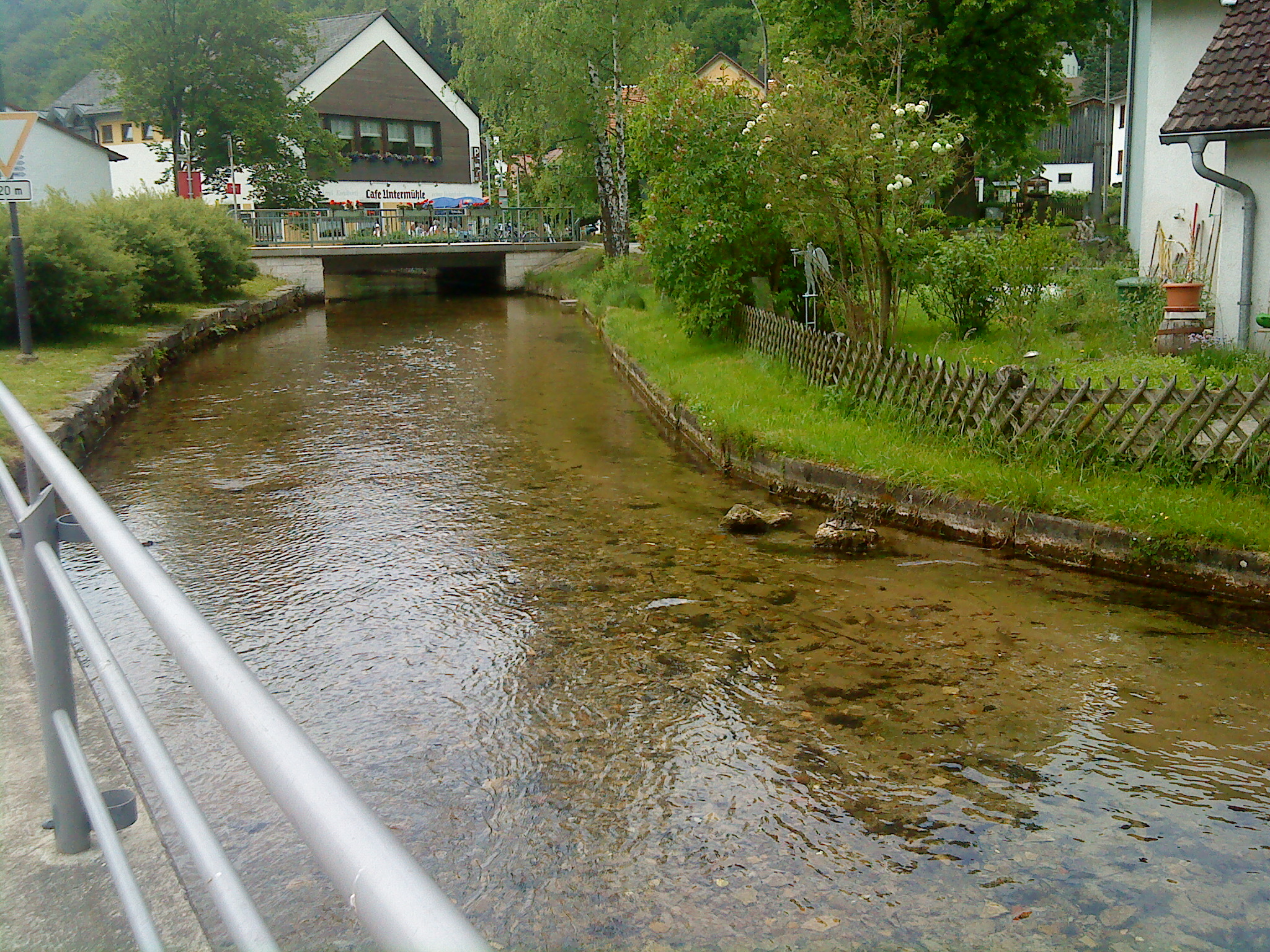
- The Mühlbach shortly after its source

Location
- Country: Germany
- States: Bavaria

Physical characteristics
- Mouth
  - location: Altmühl
  - coordinates: 49.0139°N 11.6117°E

Basin features
- Progression: Altmühl→ Danube→ Black Sea

Mühlbach is a small river of Bavaria, Germany. It is left tributary to the Altmühl river near Dietfurt.

== See also ==
- List of rivers of Bavaria
