= Halbammer =

River in Germany

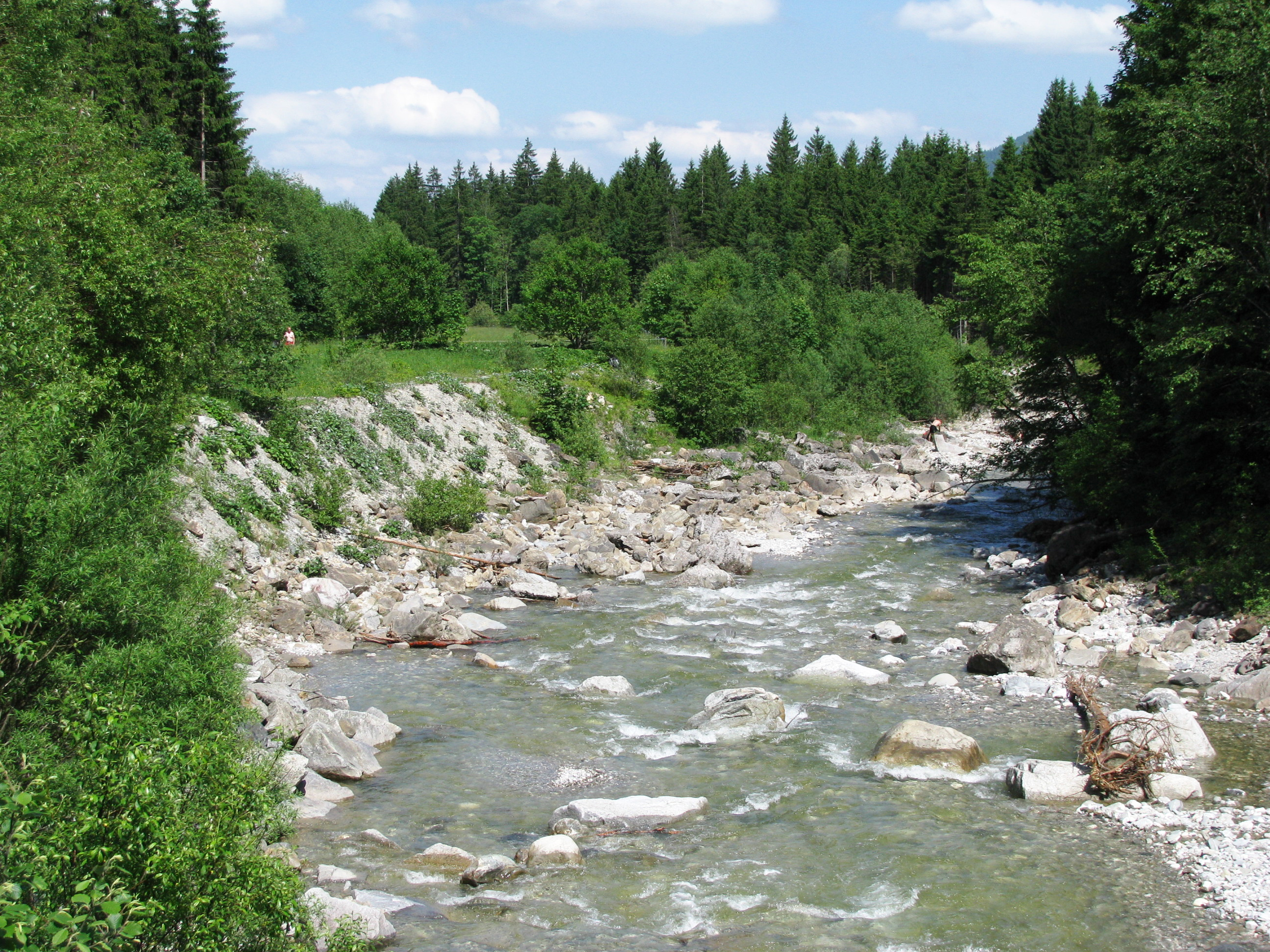
- Halbammer, flowing downstream from the bridge at Unternogg (part of Saulgrub)

Location
- Country: Germany
- State: Bavaria

Physical characteristics
- Mouth
  - location: Ammer
  - coordinates: 47.6568°N 10.9946°E
- Length: 11.8 km (7.3 mi)

Basin features
- Progression: Amper→ Isar→ Danube→ Black Sea

The Halbammer is a river in Bavaria, Germany. It flows into the Ammer west of Saulgrub.

== See also ==
- List of rivers of Bavaria
