= Feisnitz =

River in Bavaria, Germany

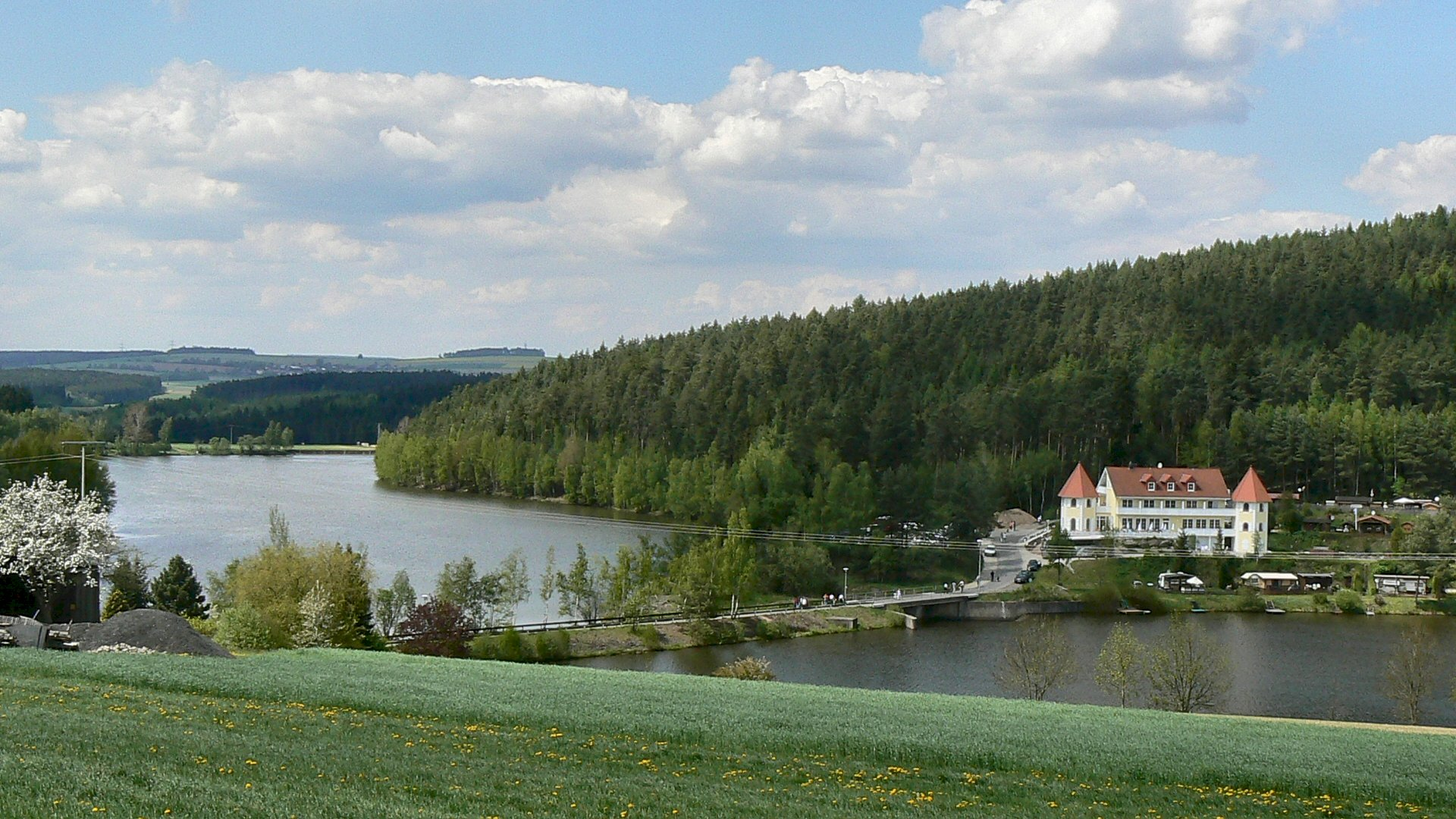
- The Feisnitz Reservoir

Location
- Country: Germany
- State: Bavaria

Physical characteristics
- Mouth
  - location: Röslau
  - coordinates: 50.0414°N 12.1699°E

Basin features
- Progression: Röslau→ Ohře→ Elbe→ North Sea

The Feisnitz is a river in Bavaria, Germany. It flows into the Röslau near Arzberg.

== See also ==
- List of rivers of Bavaria
