= Bachquellengraben =

River of Bavaria, Germany

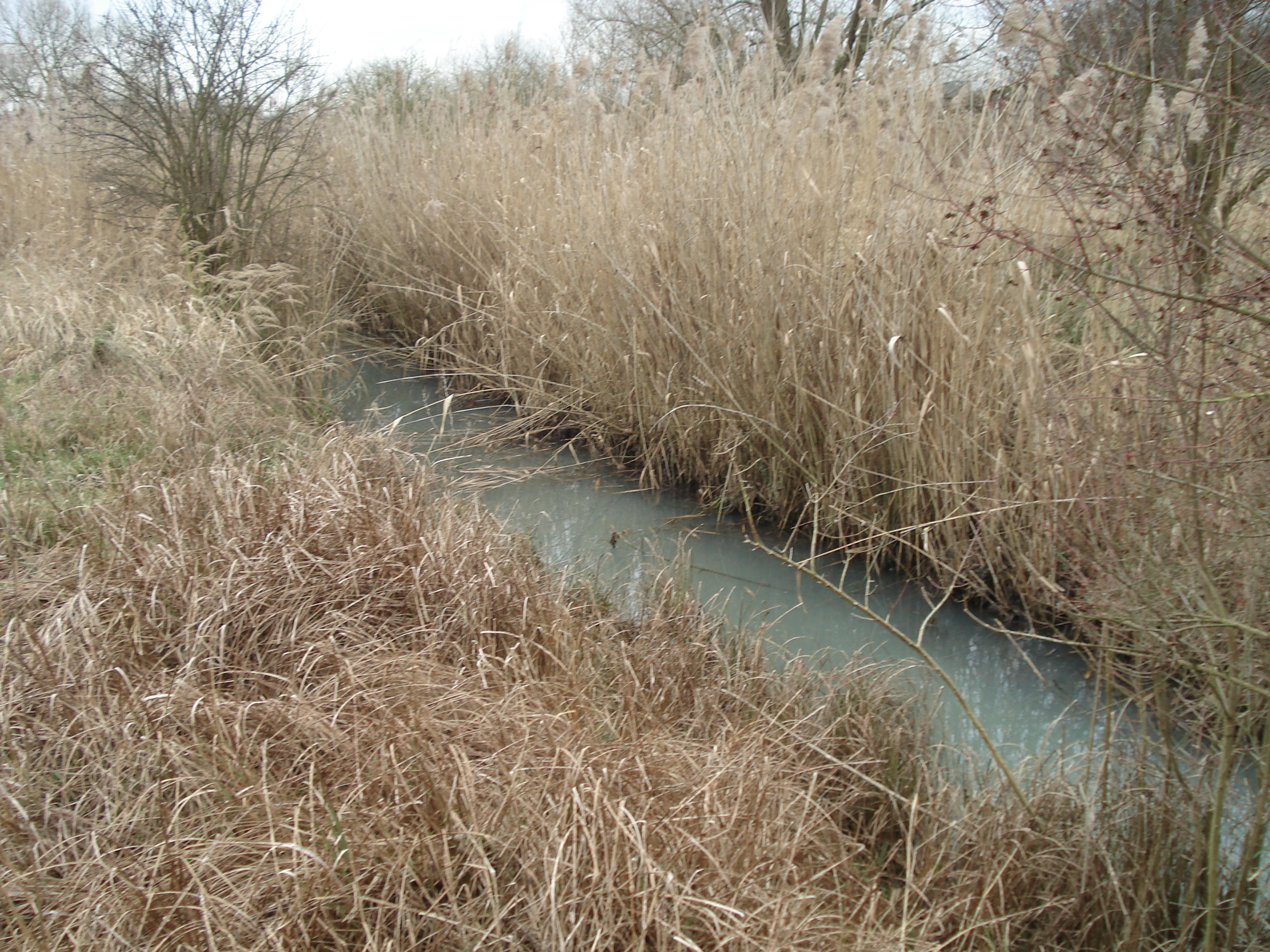
- The Bachquellengraben before its mouth into the Forchbach

Location
- Country: Germany
- State: Bavaria

Physical characteristics
- Mouth
  - location: Forchbach
  - coordinates: 50.0448°N 9.0493°E

Basin features
- Progression: Forchbach→ Main→ Rhine→ North Sea

Bachquellengraben is a small river of Bavaria, Germany. It flows into the Forchbach near Karlstein am Main.

== See also ==
- List of rivers of Bavaria
