= Gründleinsbach =

River in Germany

Location
- Country: Germany
- State: Bavaria

Physical characteristics
- Mouth
  - location: Main
  - coordinates: 49°55′56″N 10°52′04″E
- Length: 20.0 km (12.4 mi)

Basin features
- Progression: Main→ Rhine→ North Sea

Gründleinsbach is a river of Bavaria, Germany. It flows into the Main in Hallstadt.

== See also ==
- List of rivers of Bavaria
