= Waizenbach =

River in Germany

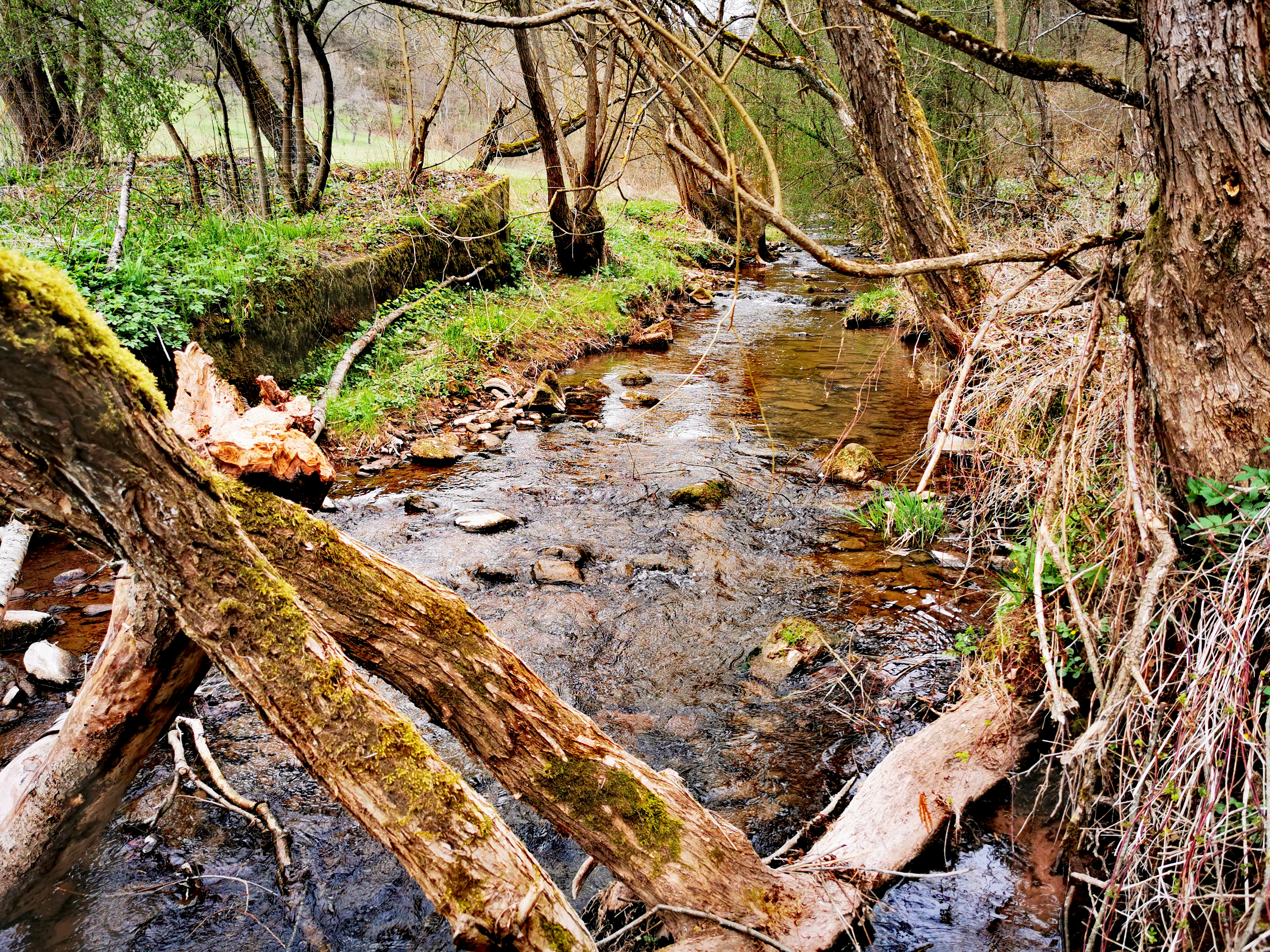

Location
- Country: Germany
- State: Bavaria

Physical characteristics
- Mouth
  - location: Franconian Saale
  - coordinates: 50.1245°N 9.7491°E

Basin features
- Progression: Franconian Saale→ Main→ Rhine→ North Sea

Waizenbach is a river of Bavaria, Germany. It flows into the Franconianf Saale near Gräfendorf.

== See also ==
- List of rivers of Bavaria
