= Schlangenbach (Regnitz) =

River in Germany

Location
- Country: Germany
- State: Bavaria

Physical characteristics
- Mouth
  - location: Regnitz
  - coordinates: 49.6647°N 11.0296°E

Basin features
- Progression: Regnitz→ Main→ Rhine→ North Sea

Schlangenbach is a river of Bavaria, Germany. It is a right tributary of the Regnitz at Baiersdorf.

== See also ==
- List of rivers of Bavaria
