= Bachmühlbach =

River of Bavaria, Germany

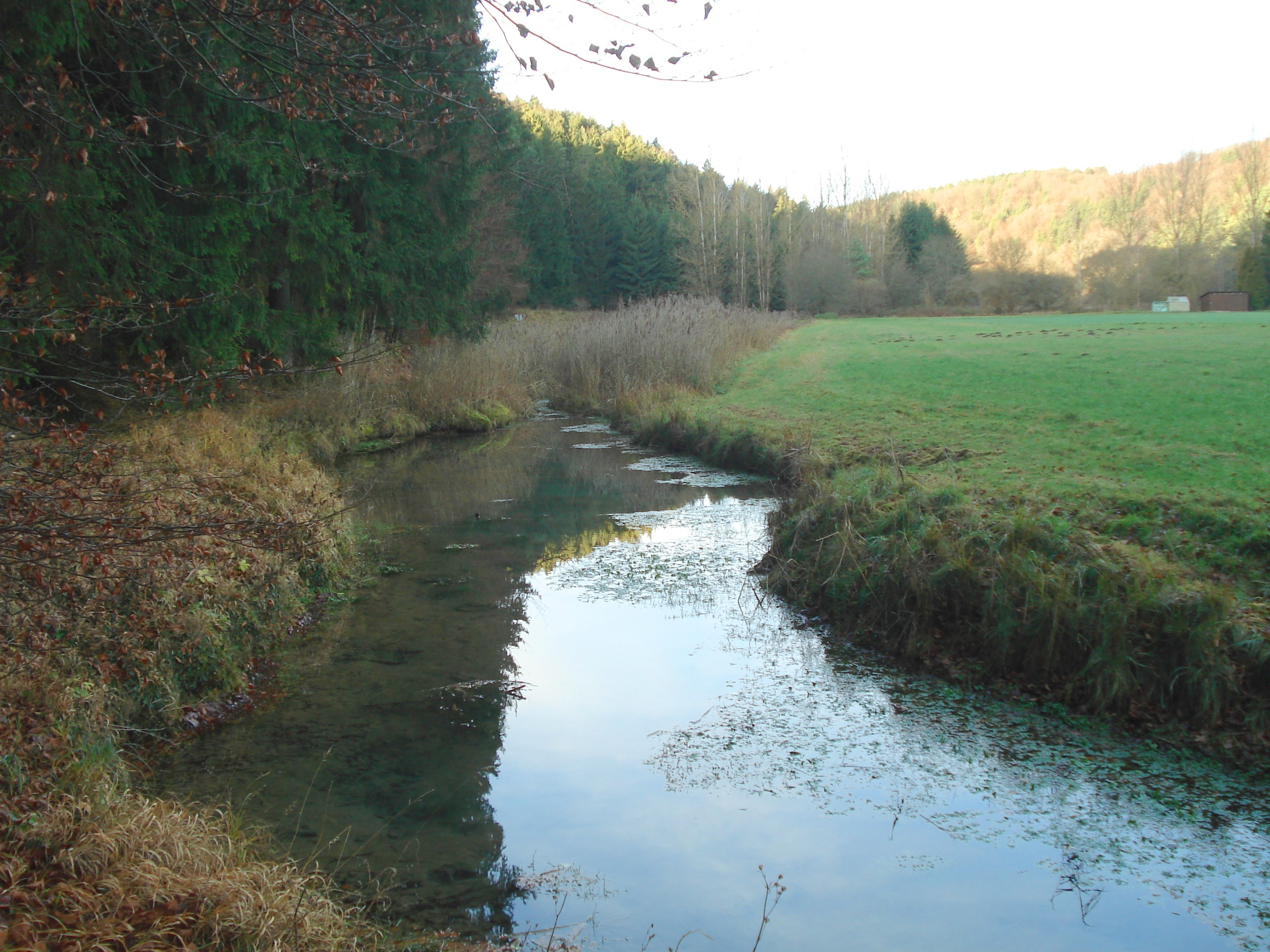
- The source of the Bachmühlbach

Location
- Country: Germany
- State: Bavaria

Physical characteristics
- Mouth
  - location: Schwarze Laber
  - coordinates: 49.0355°N 11.9007°E
- Length: 9.8 km (6.1 mi)

Basin features
- Progression: Schwarze Laber→ Danube→ Black Sea

Bachmühlbach is a river of Bavaria, Germany. It flows into the Schwarze Laber in Deuerling.

== See also ==
- List of rivers of Bavaria
