= Ussel (river) =

River in Germany

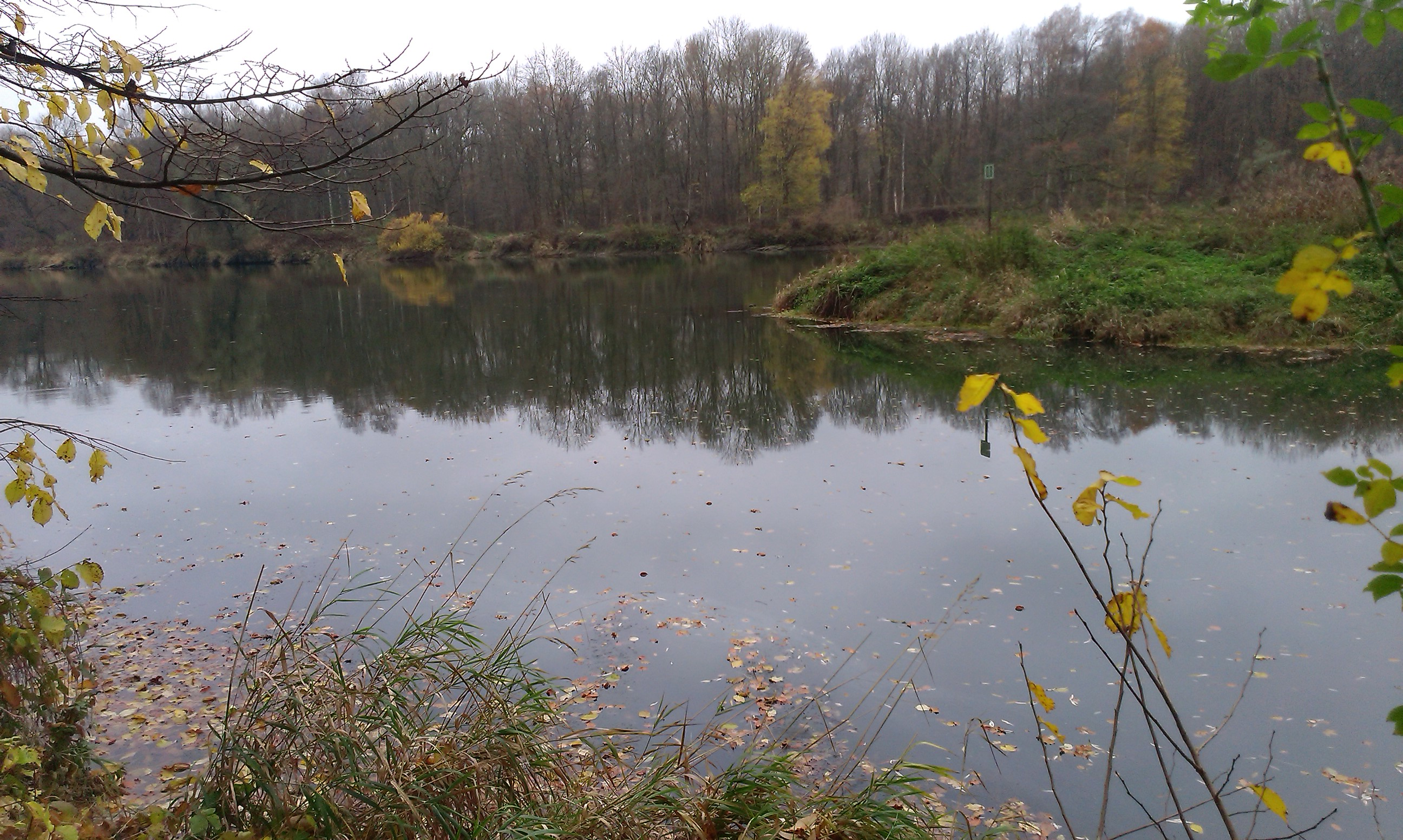
- Ussel flowing into the Danube

Location
- Country: Germany
- State: Bavaria

Physical characteristics
- Mouth
  - location: Danube
  - coordinates: 48.7389°N 11.0741°E
- Length: 34.3 km (21.3 mi)
- Basin size: 140 km^{2} (54 sq mi)

Basin features
- Progression: Danube→ Black Sea

Ussel is a river of Bavaria, Germany. It flows into the Danube near Rennertshofen.

== See also ==
- List of rivers of Bavaria
