= Münsterer Alte =

River in Germany

Location
- Country: Germany
- State: Bavaria

Physical characteristics
- Source
  - elevation: 430 m (1,410 ft)
- Mouth
  - location: Lech
  - coordinates: 48.6575°N 10.8862°E
  - elevation: 409 m (1,342 ft)
- Length: 17.7 km (11.0 mi)

Basin features
- Progression: Lech→ Danube→ Black Sea

Münsterer Alte (in its upper course: Altnet) is a river of Bavaria, Germany. It passes through Münster and flows into the Lech south of Rain.

== See also ==
- List of rivers of Bavaria
