= Zentbach =

River in Germany

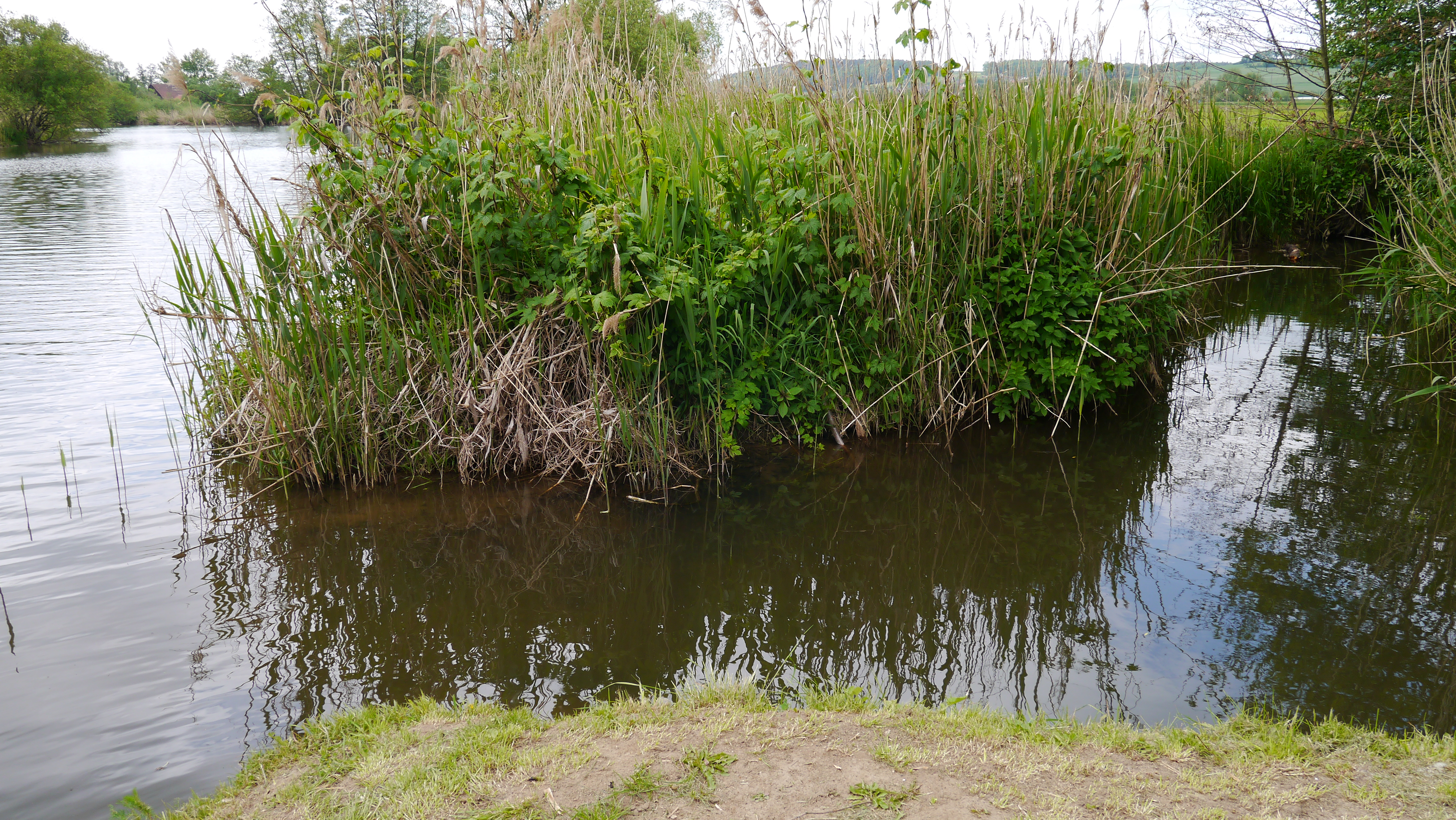
- Mouth of the Zentbach into the Main

- Mouth of the Zentbach

Location
- Country: Germany
- State: Bavaria

Physical characteristics
- Mouth
  - location: Main
  - coordinates: 50.1081°N 11.3402°E
- Length: 9.0 km (5.6 mi)

Basin features
- Progression: Main→ Rhine→ North Sea

Zentbach is a river of Upper Franconia, Bavaria, Germany. The Zentbach is a nine kilometer long northeastern, right tributary of the Main near Mainleus.

== See also ==
- List of rivers of Bavaria
