= Wiesbach (Rott) =

River in Germany

Location
- Country: Germany
- State: Bavaria

Physical characteristics
- Source
  - location: Near Frauenhaselbach (a part of Neumarkt-Sankt Veit)
  - coordinates: 48.4166°N 12.4861°E
- Mouth
  - location: Near Hörbering (a part of Neumarkt-Sankt Veit) into the Rott
  - coordinates: 50.4045°N 8.3916°E

Basin features
- Progression: Rott→ Inn→ Danube→ Black Sea

Wiesbach (German pronunciation: [ˈviːsbax]) is a river of Bavaria, Germany.

The Wiesbach springs near Frauenhaselbach, a parish of Neumarkt-Sankt Veit). It is a left tributary of the Rott near the parish Hörbering of Neumarkt-Sankt Veit.

== See also ==
- List of rivers of Bavaria
