= Schörgenbach =

River in Germany

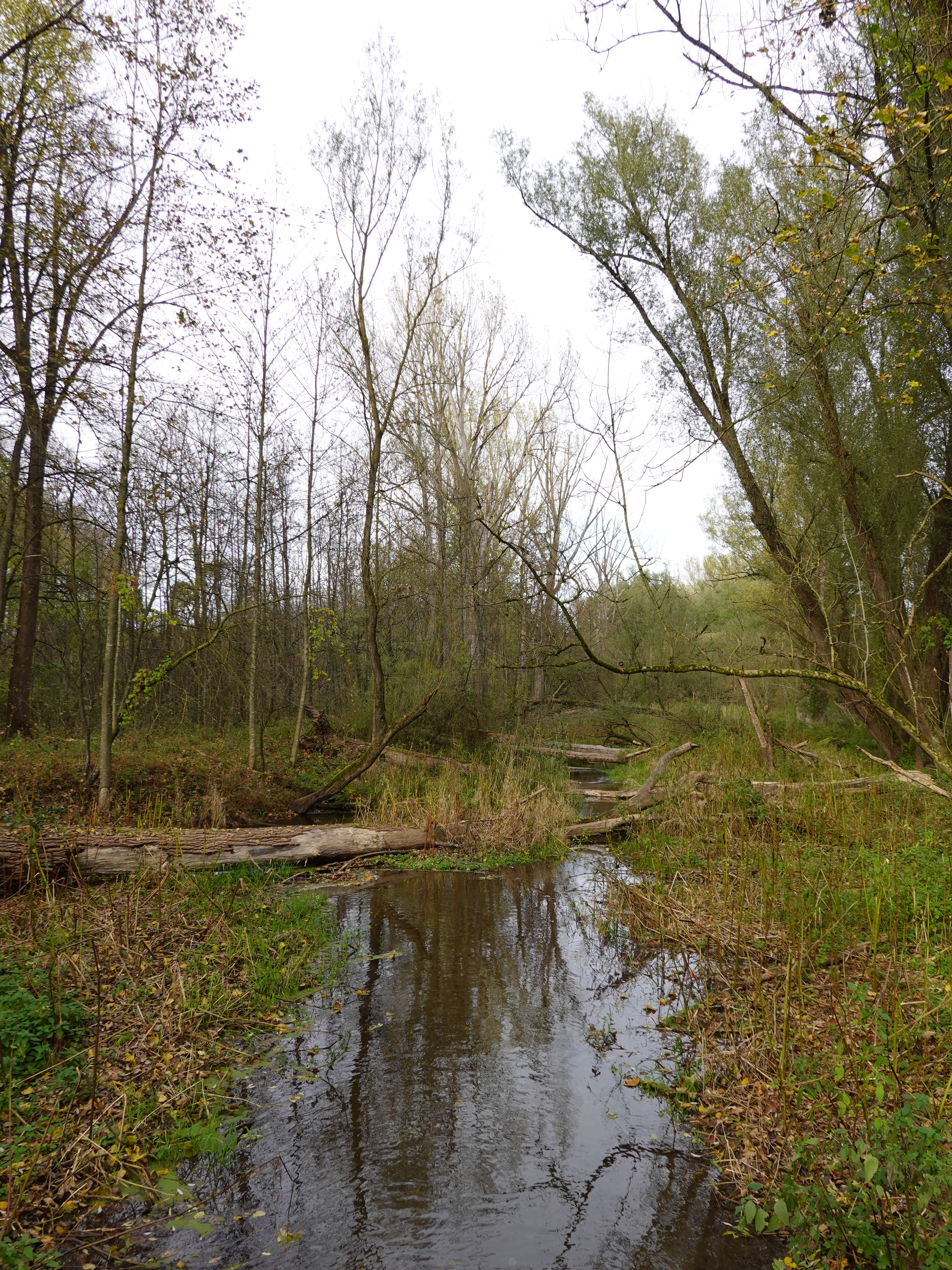
- The Schörgenbach between Gut Zwillingshof und Isarsteg

Location
- Country: Germany
- State: Bavaria

Physical characteristics
- Mouth
  - location: Isar
  - coordinates: 48.3127°N 11.6999°E
- Length: 13.9 km (8.6 mi)

Basin features
- Progression: Isar→ Danube→ Black Sea

Schörgenbach is a river of Bavaria, Germany. It flows into the Isar near Hallbergmoos.

== See also ==
- List of rivers of Bavaria
