= Aiterach =

River in Germany

- The Aiterach shortly before its mouth

- Location of mouth

Location
- Country: Germany
- State: Bavaria

Physical characteristics
- Mouth
  - location: Danube
  - coordinates: 48.9044°N 12.6448°E
- Length: 39.3 km (24.4 mi)
- Basin size: 166 km^{2} (64 sq mi)

Basin features
- Progression: Danube→ Black Sea

The Aiterach is a river of Bavaria, Germany. It is a tributary of the Danube, flowing into it near Straubing.

== See also ==
- List of rivers of Bavaria
