= Schlossauer Ohe =

River in Germany

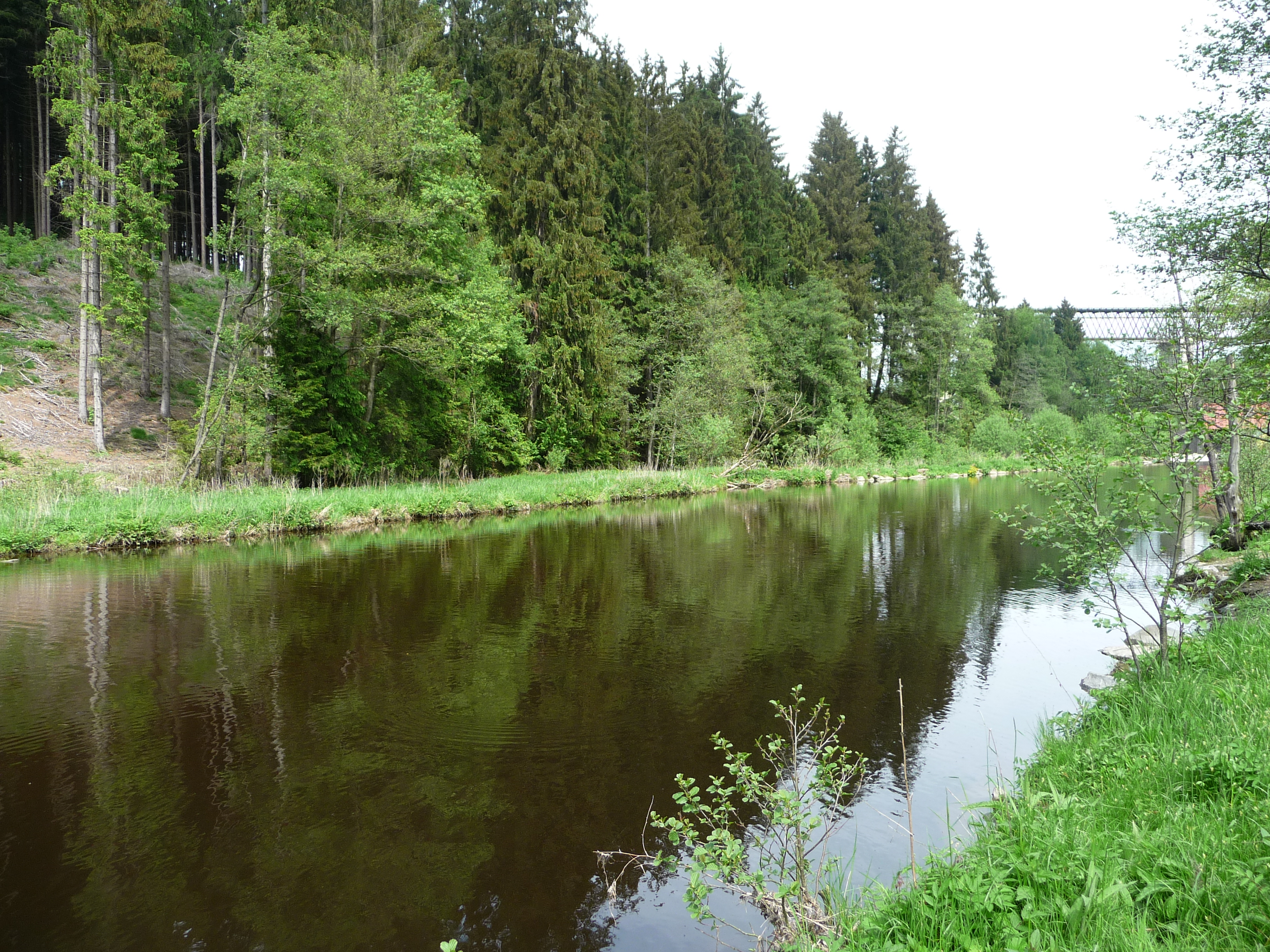
- The Schlossauer Ohe near Regen, in the background the railway bridge that goes over it

Location
- Country: Germany
- State: Bavaria

Physical characteristics
- Mouth
  - location: Schwarzer Regen
  - coordinates: 48.9671°N 13.1061°E
- Length: 17.2 km (10.7 mi)

Basin features
- Progression: Regen→ Danube→ Black Sea

Schlossauer Ohe is a river of Bavaria, Germany. It is a right tributary of the Schwarzer Regen, the upper course of the Regen, near the town Regen.

== See also ==
- List of rivers of Bavaria
