= Erlenbach (Kahl) =

River in Germany

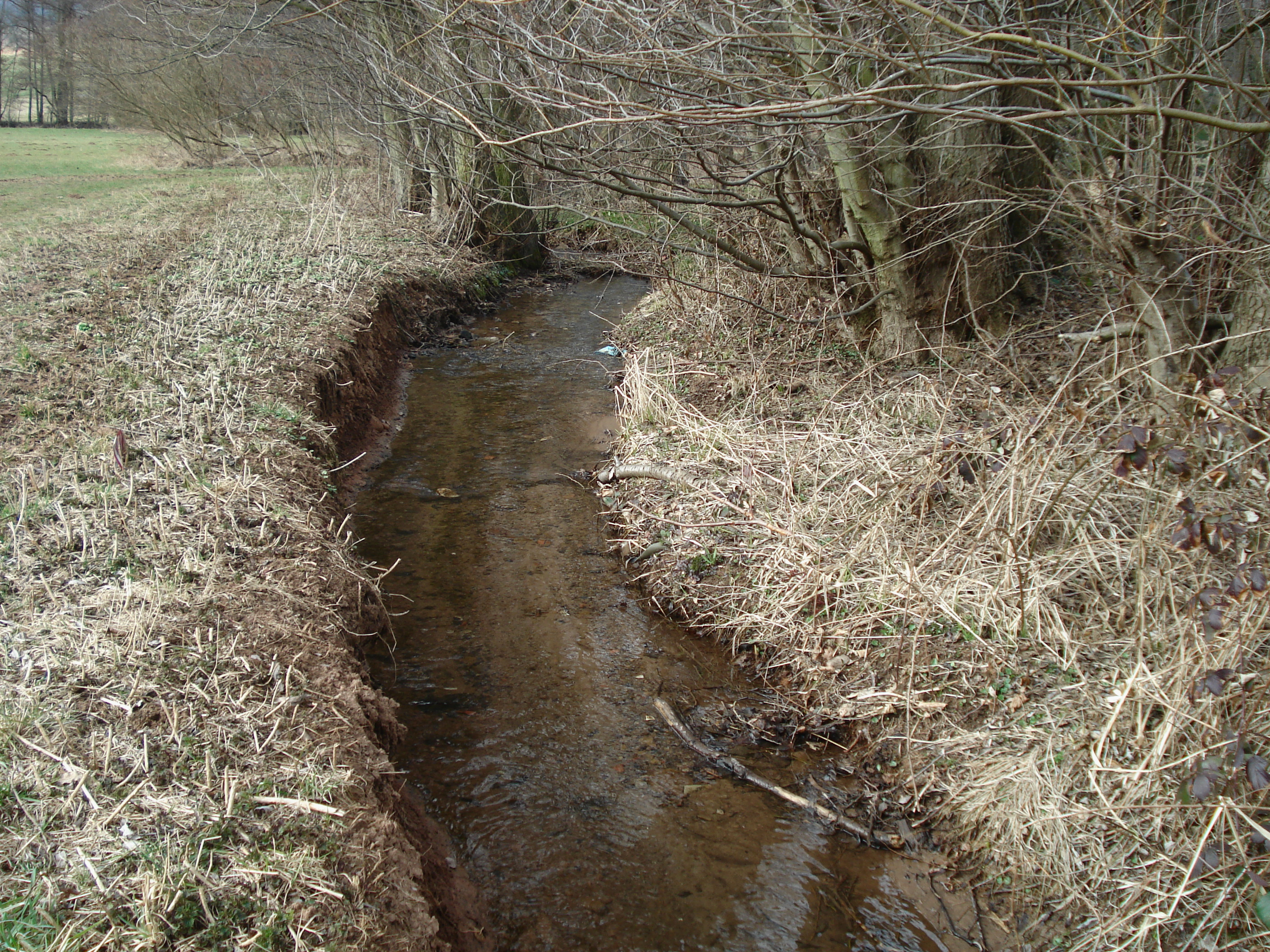
- The Erlenbach north of the village Erlenbach, a part of Blankenbach

Location
- Country: Germany
- State: Bavaria

Physical characteristics
- Mouth
  - location: Kahl
  - coordinates: 50.0602°N 9.2241°E

Basin features
- Progression: Kahl→ Main→ Rhine→ North Sea
- Tributaries
  - left: Salzersgraben

Erlenbach (German: [ˈɛʁlənbax]) is a small river of Bavaria, Germany. It is a left tributary of the Kahl near Blankenbach.

== See also ==
- List of rivers of Bavaria
