= Leuchsenbach =

River in Germany

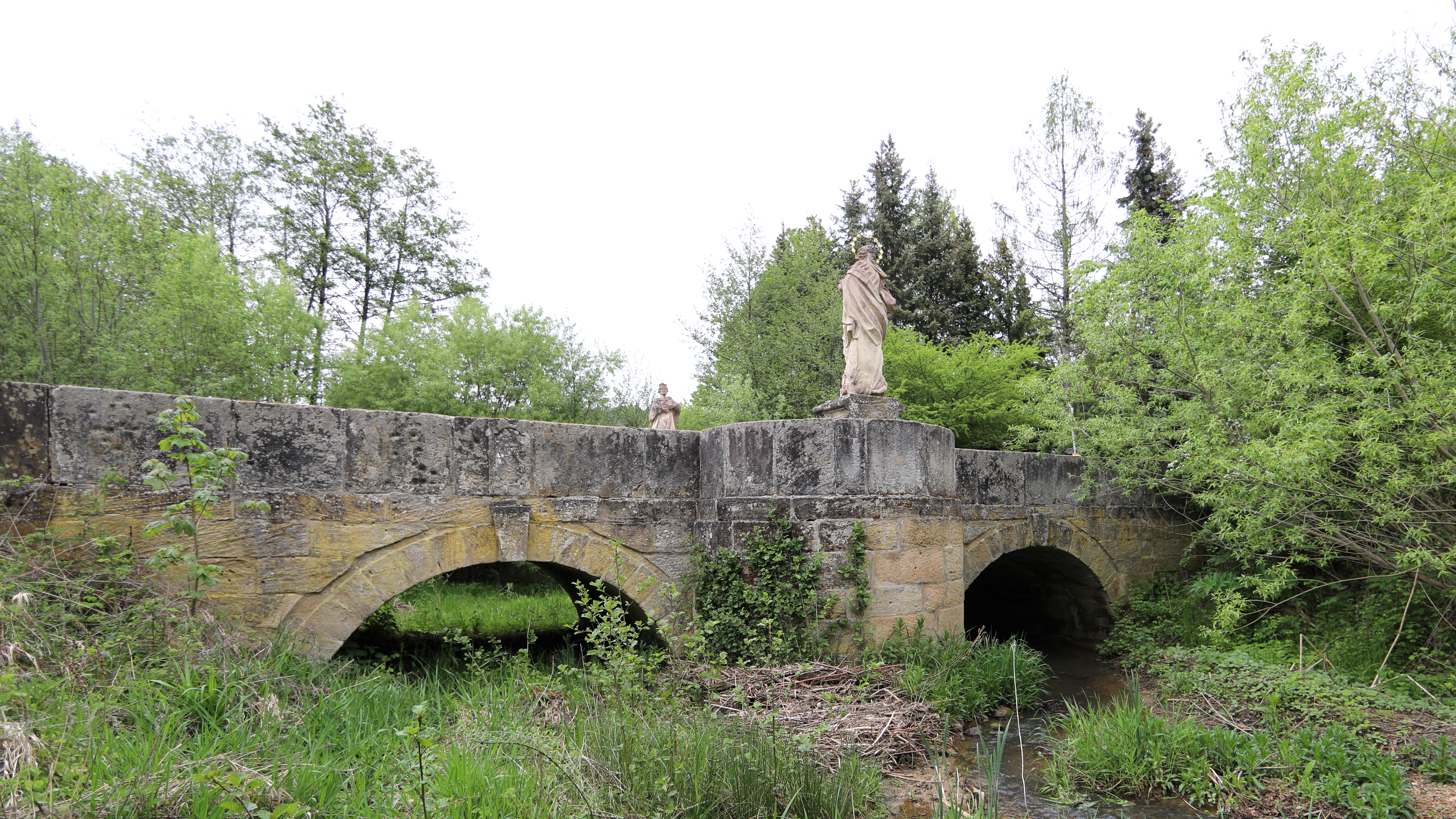
- Bridge over the Leuchsenbach in Klosterlangheim (part of Lichtenfels)

Location
- Country: Germany
- State: Bavaria

Physical characteristics
- Mouth
  - location: Main
  - coordinates: 50.1459°N 11.0535°E
- Length: 11.0 km (6.8 mi)

Basin features
- Progression: Main→ Rhine→ North Sea

Leuchsenbach is a river of Bavaria, Germany. It flows into a branch of the Main in Lichtenfels.

== See also ==
- List of rivers of Bavaria
