= Grambach (Tegernsee) =

River in Germany

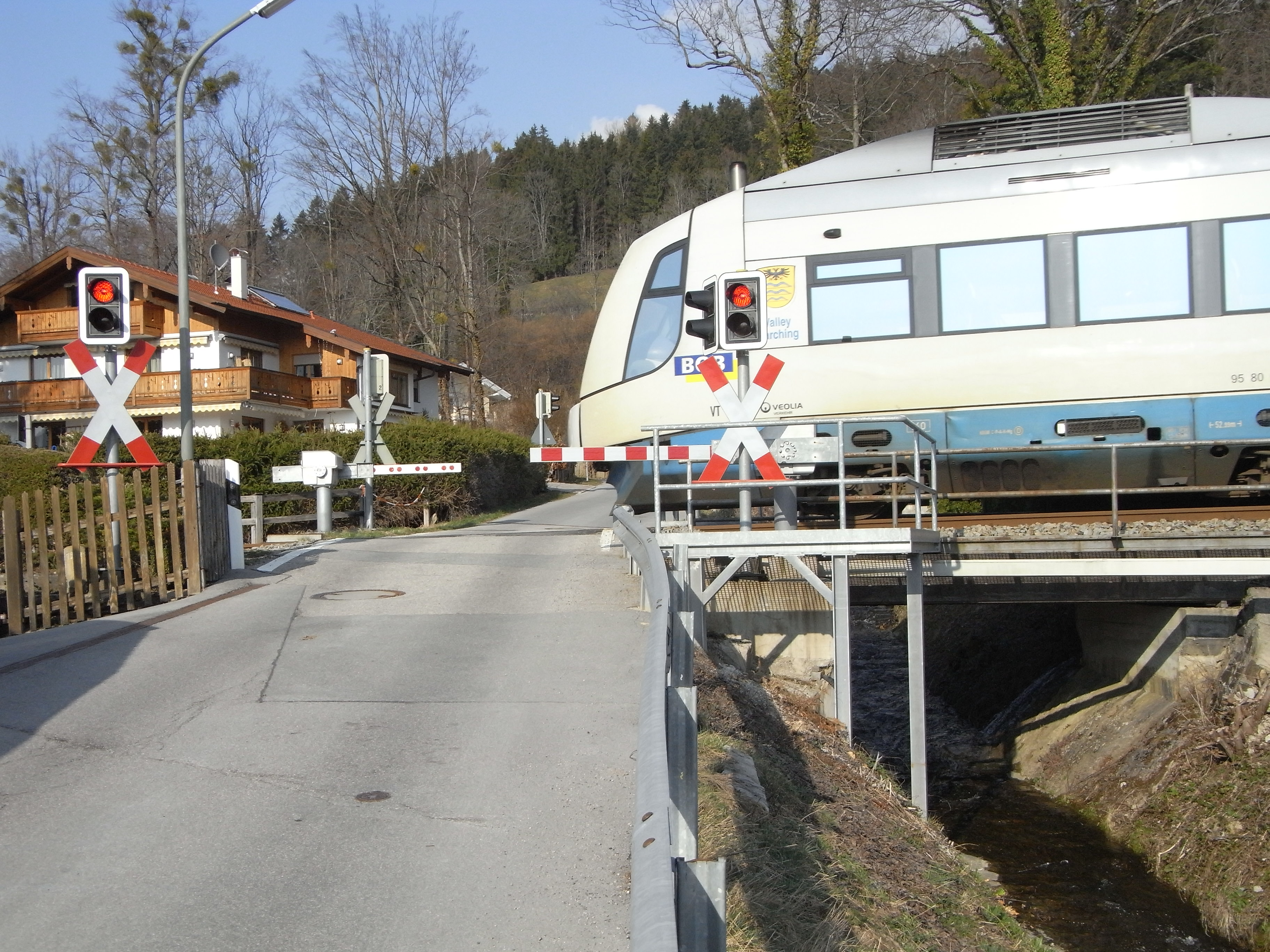
- The Grambach in Sankt Quirin (a part of Gmund am Tegernsee)

Location
- Country: Germany
- States: Bavaria

Physical characteristics
- Mouth
  - location: Tegernsee
  - coordinates: 47°43′43″N 11°44′31″E

Basin features
- Progression: Mangfall→ Inn→ Danube→ Black Sea

Grambach is a small river of Bavaria, Germany. In Sankt Quirin (a part of Gmund am Tegernsee), it flows into the Tegernsee, which is drained by the Mangfall.

== See also ==
- List of rivers of Bavaria
