= Ecknach =

River in Germany

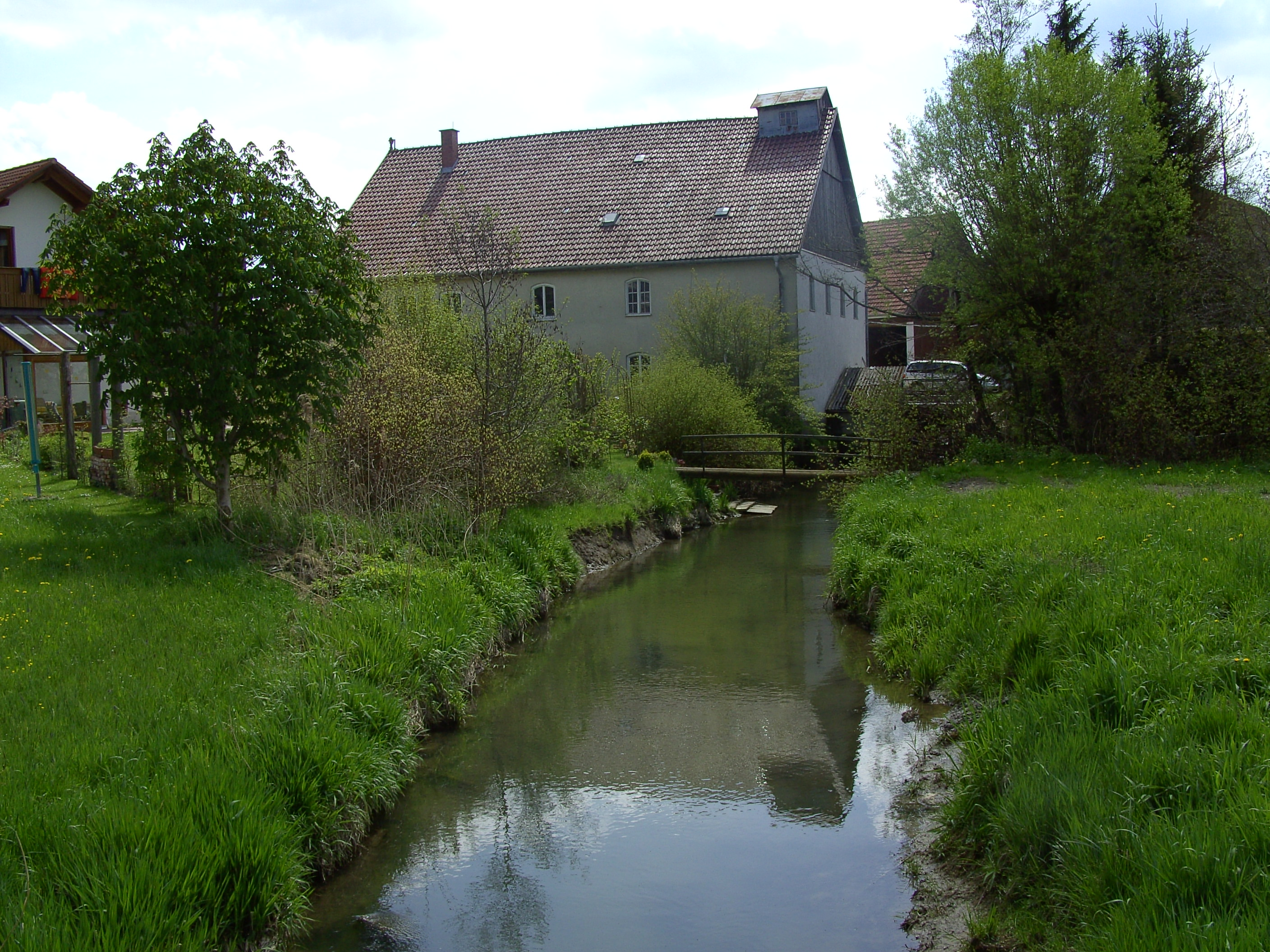
- The Ecknach at Sielenbach

Location
- Country: Germany
- State: Bavaria

Physical characteristics
- Mouth
  - location: Paar
  - coordinates: 48.4531°N 11.1247°E
- Length: 20.3 km (12.6 mi)

Basin features
- Progression: Paar→ Danube→ Black Sea

Ecknach is a river of Bavaria, Germany. It flows into the Paar in Aichach.

== See also ==
- List of rivers of Bavaria
