= Kahl =

Kahl may refer to:

== Places ==
- Kahl am Main (officially German: Kahl a. Main), a community in the Aschaffenburg district in the Regierungsbezirk of Lower Franconia
- Kahl (river), a river in the northern Spessart in Bavaria and Hesse
- Kahl (god), a god of pre-Islamic Arabia associated with the Kinda capital of Qaryat al-Faw
- Kleine Kahl ("Little Kahl"), a left tributary of the Kahl in the northern Spessart in Lower Franconia, Bavaria
- Sommerkahl (Kahl), a left tributary of the Kahl in the northern Spessart in Lower Franconia, Bavaria

== Media ==
- KAHL (AM), a radio station (1310 AM) licensed to serve San Antonio, Texas, US
- KAHL-FM, a radio station (105.9 FM) licensed to serve Hondo, Texas
- KOOQ, a radio station (1410 AM) licensed to serve North Platte, Nebraska, United States, which held the call sign KAHL until 1983

== Other ==
- Kahl (film), a 1961 short German documentary film
- Kahl (surname)
- Kahl Nuclear Power Plant, the first nuclear power plant in Germany
- Kahl Building (also known as Capitol Theatre), a building in Downtown Davenport, Iowa, US
