= Edelbach =

Edelbach may refer to:

- Edelbach, Allentsteig, a cadastral community of Allentsteig in Lower Austria, Austria
- Edelbach, a subdivision of Kleinkahl, a community in Bavaria, Germany
- Edelbach (Kahl), a river of Bavaria, Germany, tributary of the Kahl
- Edelbach (Nidda), a river of Hesse, Germany, tributary of the Nidda
