= Kleinlaudenbach =

Kleinlaudenbach may refer to:

- Kleinlaudenbach (Kahl), a river of Bavaria, Germany, tributary of the Kahl
- Kleinlaudenbach, a subdivision of Kleinkahl, a community in Lower Franconia, Bavaria, Germany
