= Rappach =

Rappach may refer to:

- Rappach (Kahl), a river of Bavaria, Germany, tributary of the Kahl
- Rappach Water, upper reaches of the River Einig of Scotland, tributary of the River Oykel
- Rappach, a district of the community Mömbris in Bavaria, Germany
