= Weibersbach =

Weibersbach may refer to:

- Weibersbach (Kahl, Michelbach), a river of Bavaria, Germany, tributary of the Kahl in Michelbach, a district of Alzenau
- Weibersbach (Kahl, Schimborn), a river of Bavaria, Germany, tributary of the Kahl in Schimborn, a district of Mömbris
- Steinbach (Hafenlohr), also called Weibersbach, a river of Bavaria, Germany, tributary of the Hafenlohr
