= Eichbach (Weibersbach) =

River in Germany

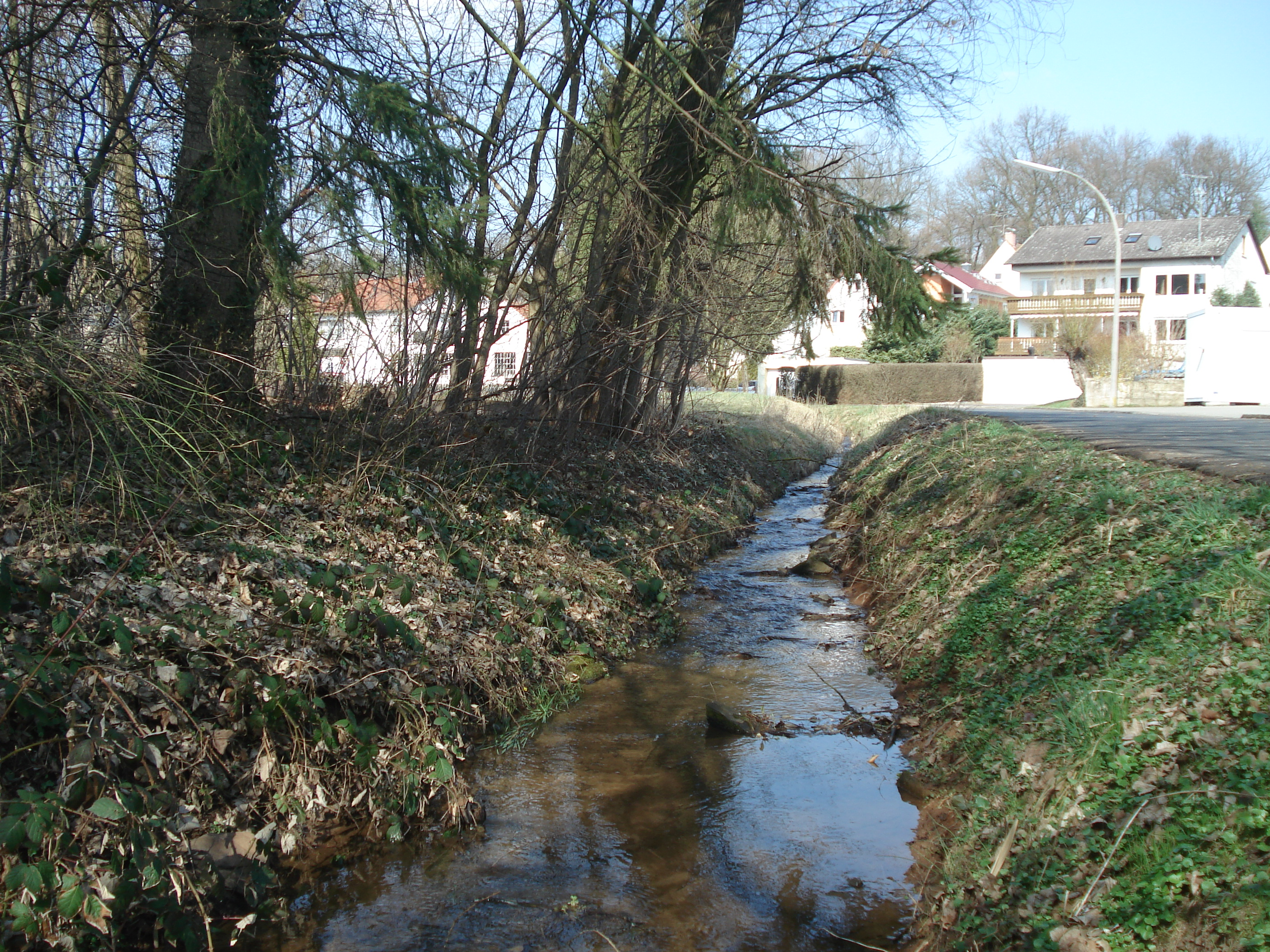
- The Eichbach in Albstadt

Location
- Country: Germany
- States: Hesse and Bavaria

Physical characteristics
- Mouth
  - location: Weibersbach
  - coordinates: 50°07′06″N 9°06′58″E

Basin features
- Progression: Weibersbach→ Kahl→ Main→ Rhine→ North Sea

Eichbach is a small river of Hesse and of Bavaria, Germany. It is the right headwater of the Weibersbach in Albstadt, a part of Alzenau.

== See also ==
- List of rivers of Hesse
- List of rivers of Bavaria
