= Habersbach =

River in Germany

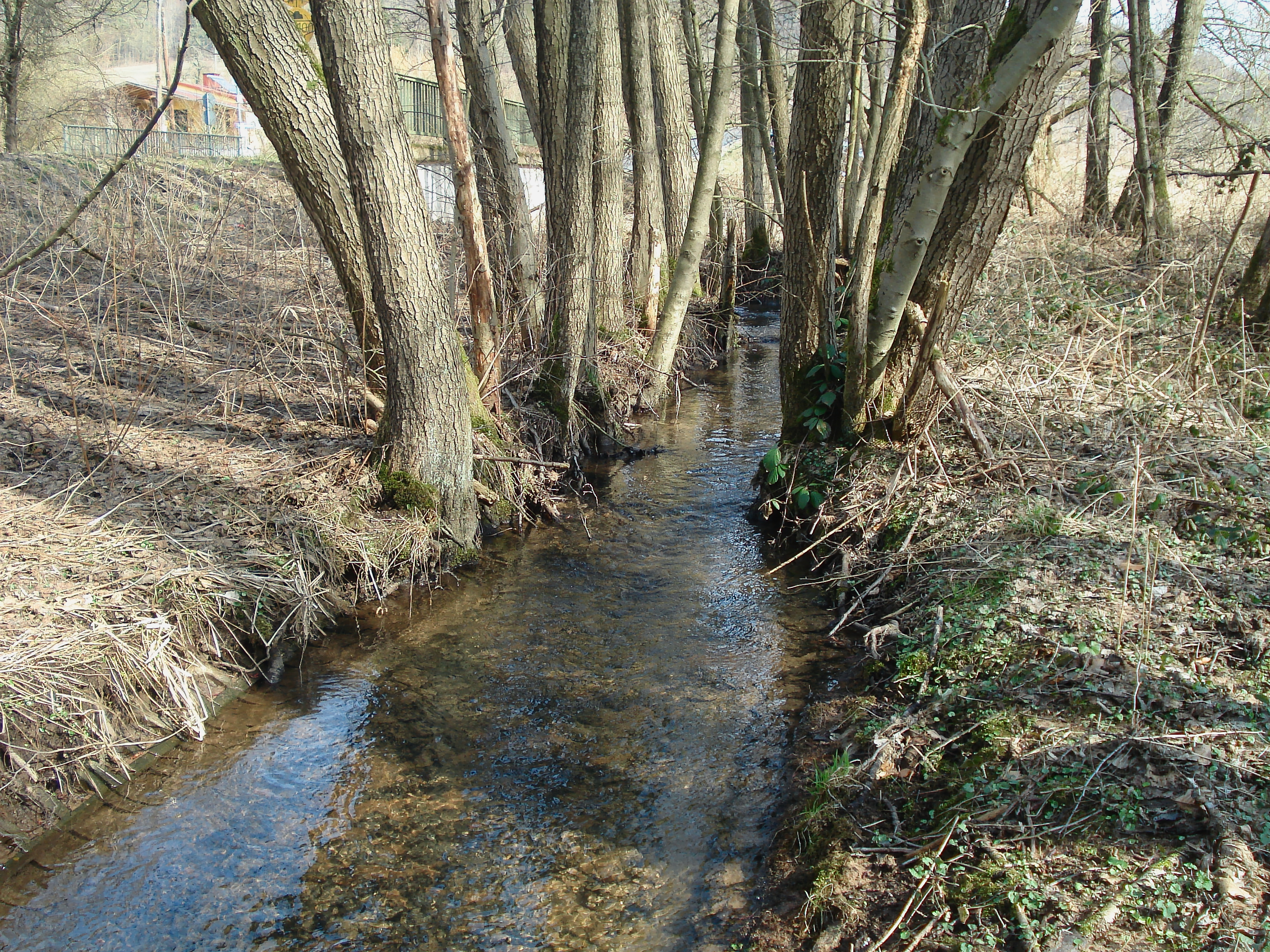
- The Haberbach at the Wesemichshof (part of Kleinkahl)

Location
- Country: Germany
- States: Bavaria

Physical characteristics
- Mouth
  - location: Kahl
  - coordinates: 50.1175°N 9.2891°E

Basin features
- Progression: Kahl→ Main→ Rhine→ North Sea

The Habersbach is a stream in the Bavarian Spessart mountains, Germany. It is just over 2 kilometers long. It flows into the Kahl near Kleinkahl.

== See also ==
- List of rivers of Bavaria
