= Feldkahl =

River in Germany

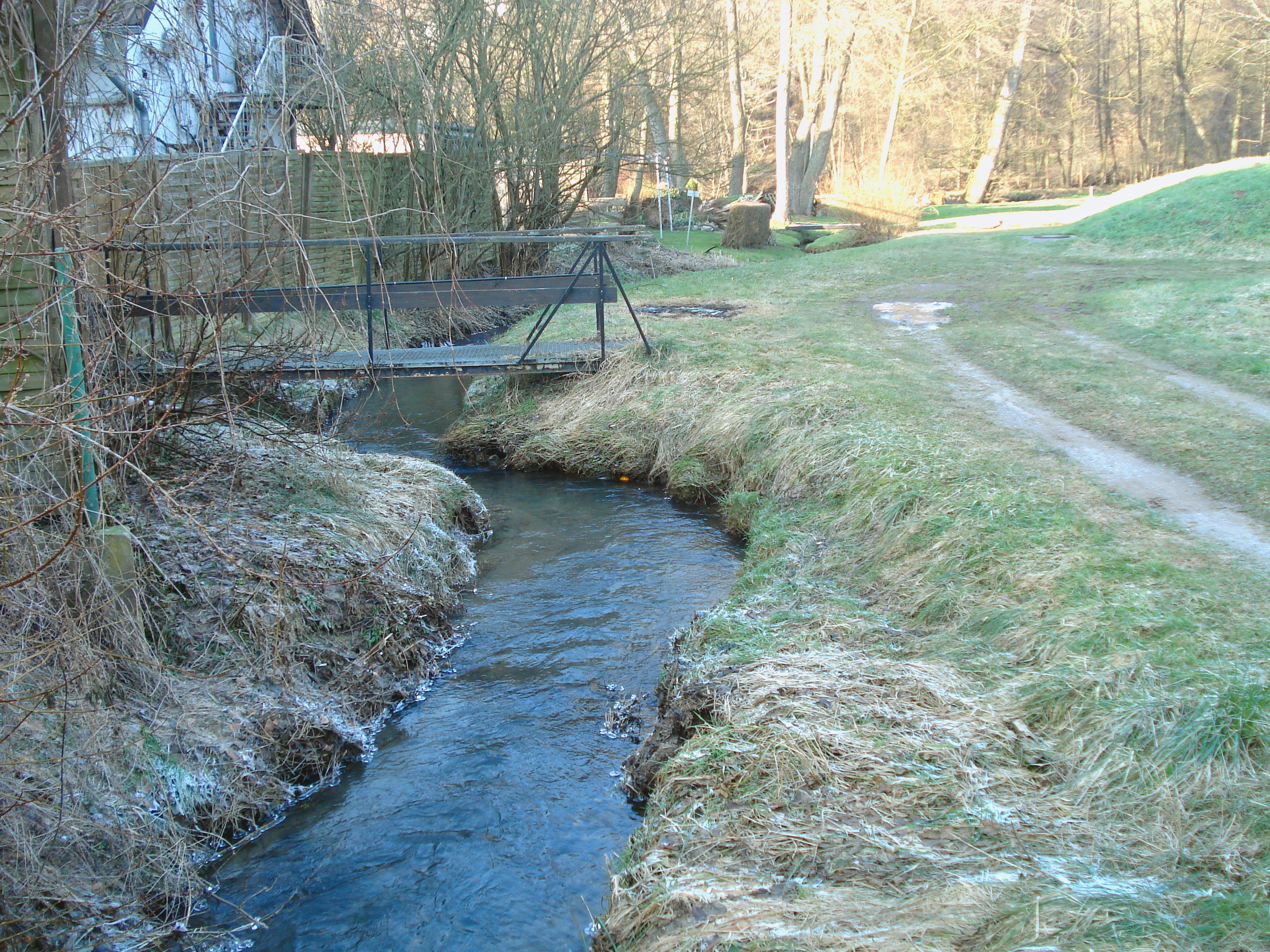
- The Feldkahl in Schimborn, a part of Mömbris

Location
- Country: Germany
- State: Bavaria

Physical characteristics
- Mouth
  - location: Kahl
  - coordinates: 50.0572°N 9.1889°E

Basin features
- Progression: Kahl→ Main→ Rhine→ North Sea
- Tributaries
  - left: Folzbach

Feldkahl is a small river in Bavaria, Germany. It flows into the Kahl in Schimborn, a part of Mömbris.

== See also ==
- List of rivers of Bavaria
