= Steinbach (Kahl) =

River in Germany

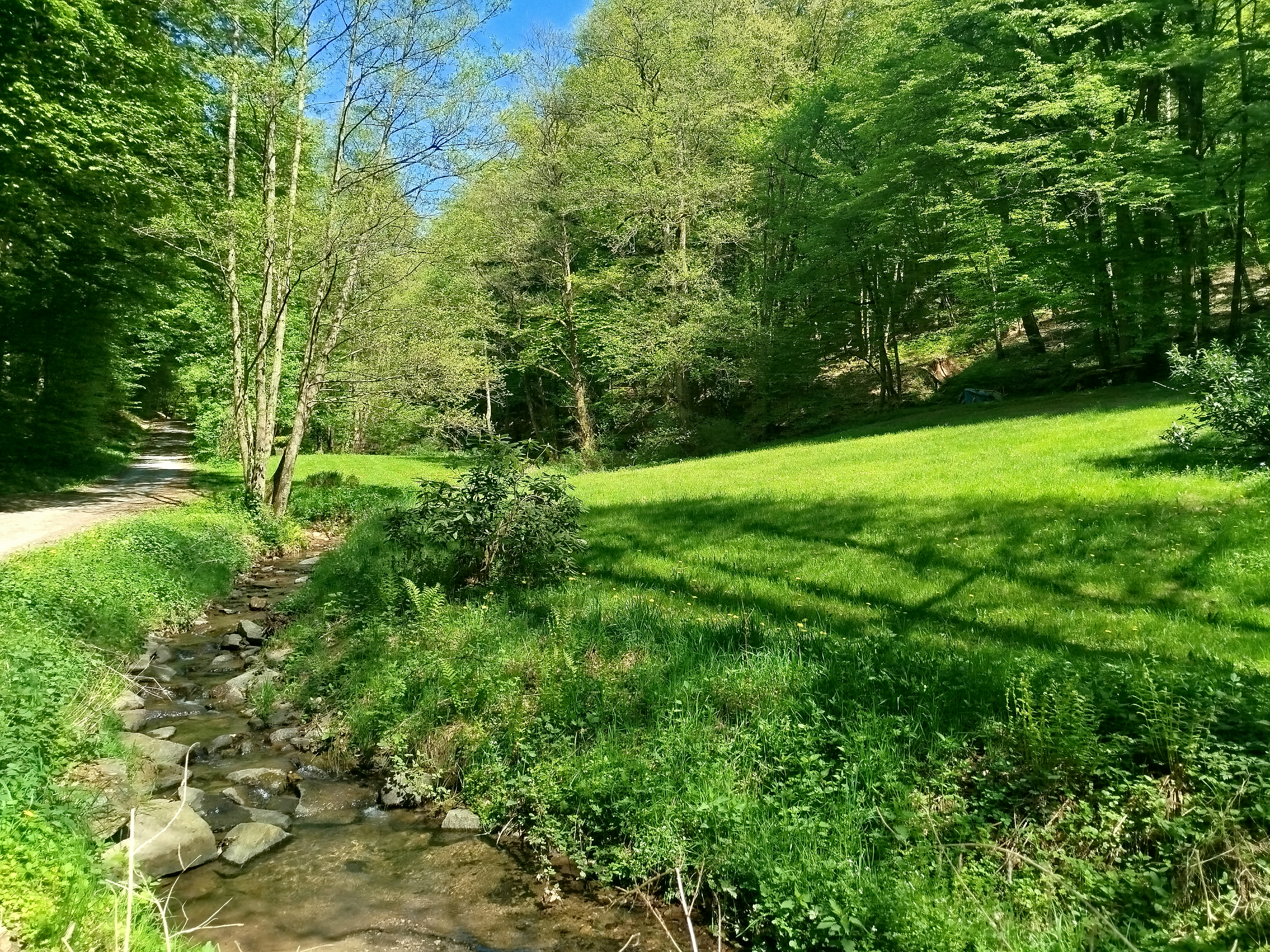
- The Steinbach at Niedersteinbach, a borough of Mömbris

Location
- Country: Germany
- State: Bavaria

Physical characteristics
- Mouth
  - location: Kahl
  - coordinates: 50.0853°N 9.1490°E

Basin features
- Progression: Kahl→ Main→ Rhine→ North Sea

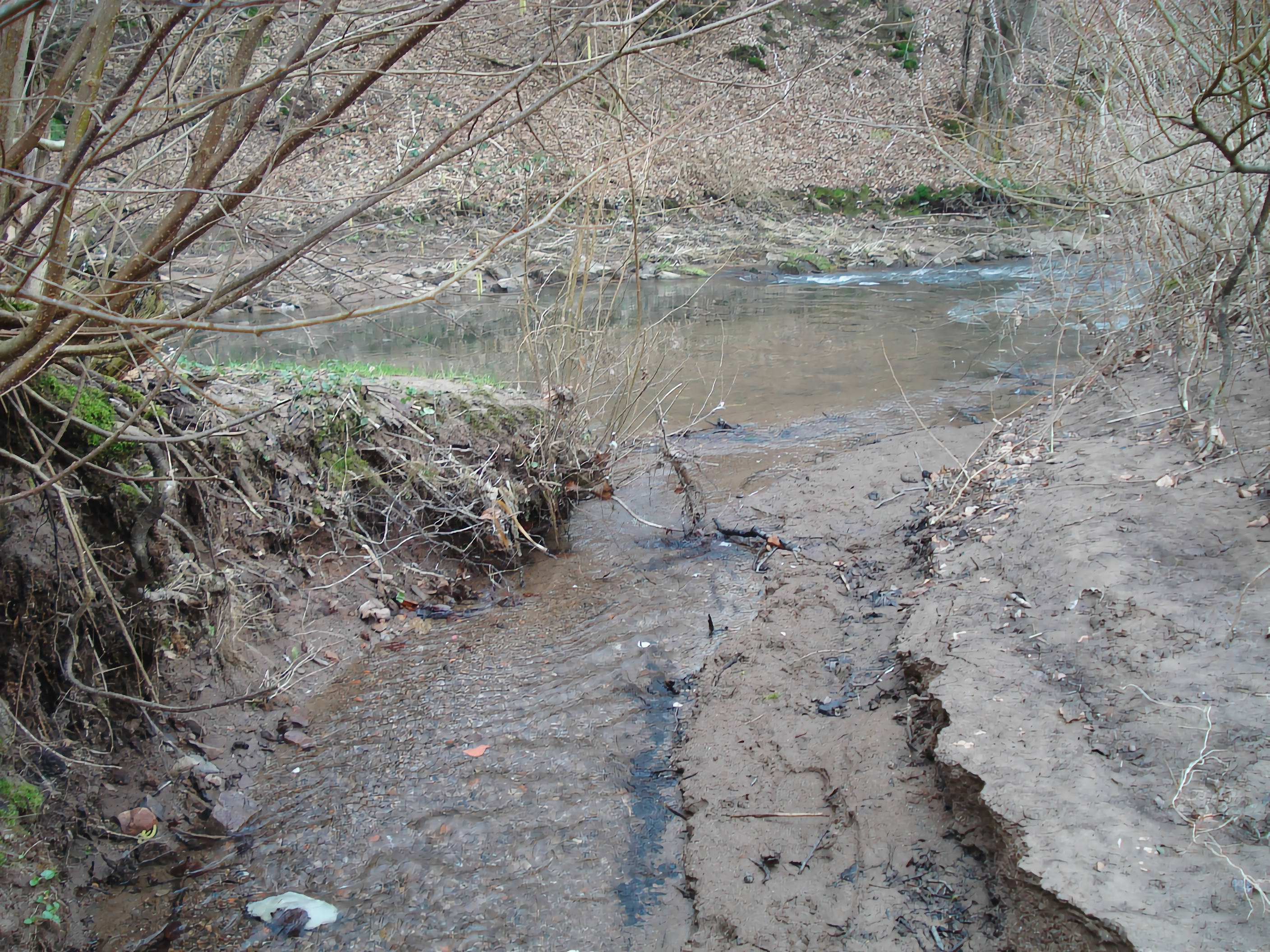
The Steinbach flowing into the Kahl

Steinbach is a small river of Bavaria, Germany. It is a right tributary of the Kahl near Mömbris.

== See also ==
- List of rivers of Bavaria
