= Oberschurbach =

River in Germany

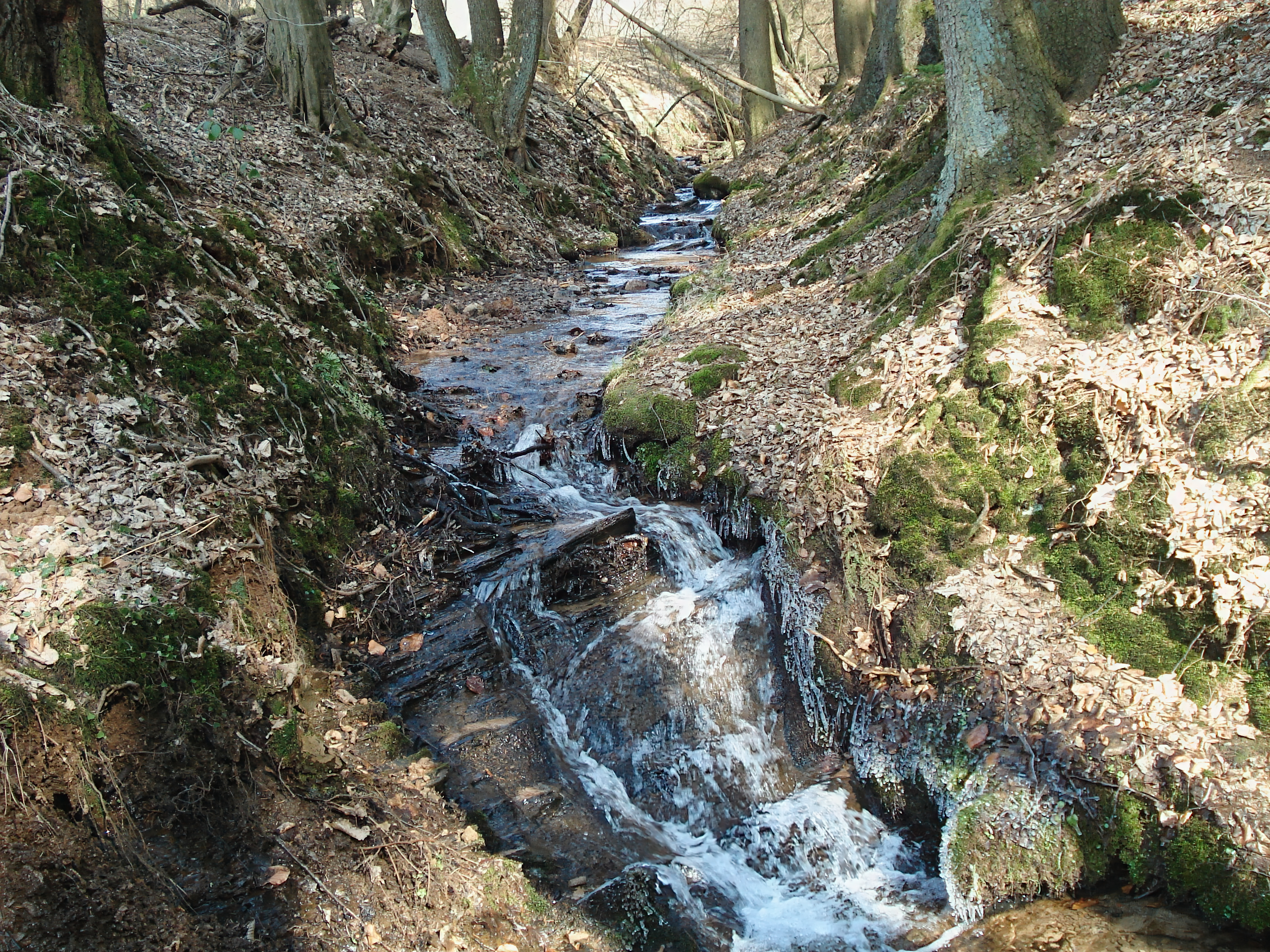
- The Oberschurbach between Oberschur (part of Krombach) and Mensengesäß (part of Mömbris)

Location
- Country: Germany
- States: Bavaria

Physical characteristics
- Mouth
  - location: Kahl
  - coordinates: 50.0695°N 9.1663°E

Basin features
- Progression: Kahl→ Main→ Rhine→ North Sea

Oberschurbach is a small river of Bavaria, Germany. It flows into the Kahl in Mömbris.

== See also ==
- List of rivers of Bavaria
