= Wehmig =

River in Germany

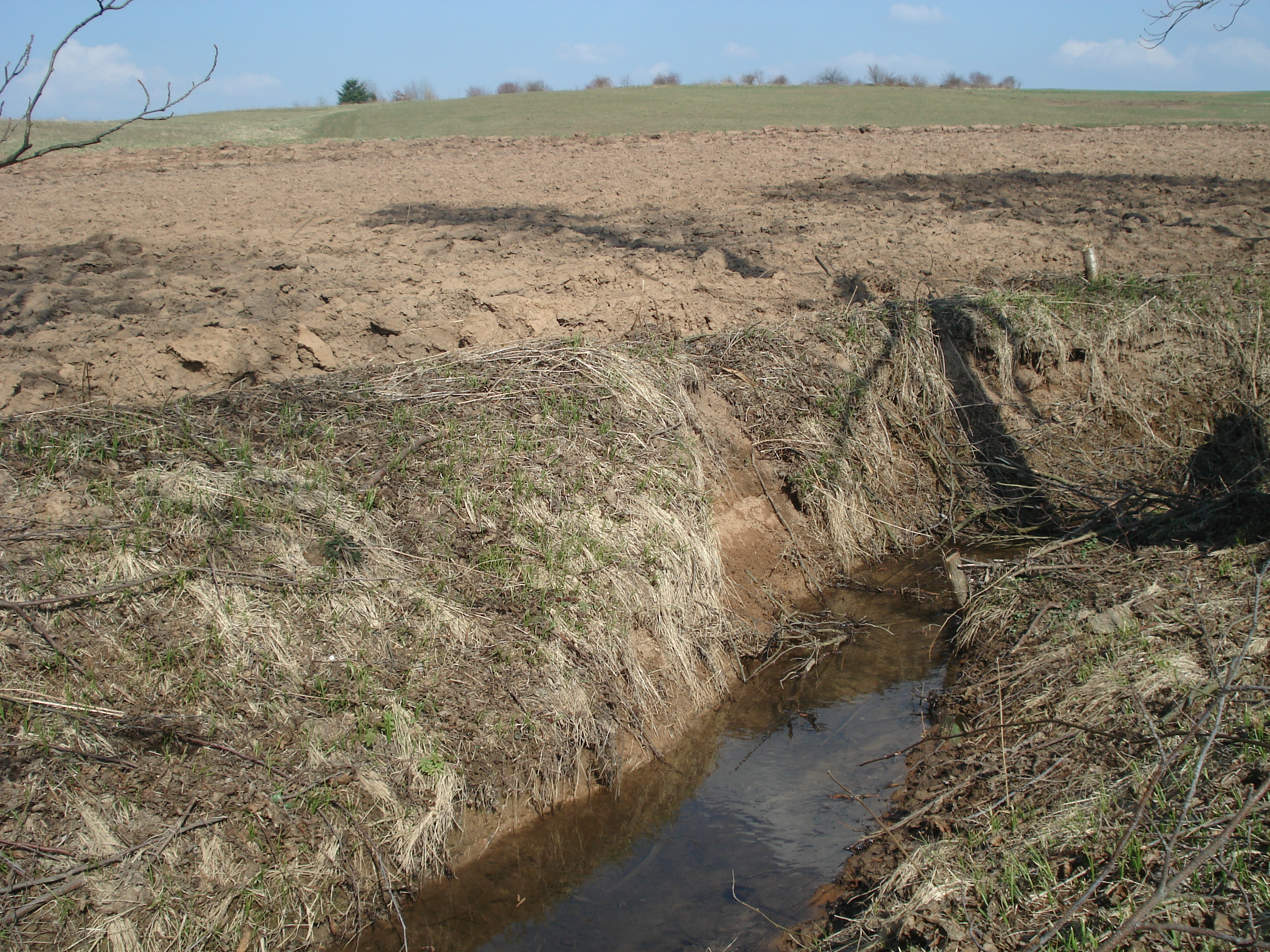
- The Wehmig south of Neuses

Location
- Country: Germany
- State: Bavaria

Physical characteristics
- Mouth
  - location: Weibersbach
  - coordinates: 50.1183°N 9.1161°E

Basin features
- Progression: Weibersbach→ Kahl→ Main→ Rhine→ North Sea
- Tributaries
  - left: Ruhgraben

Wehmig is a small river of Bavaria, Germany. It is the left headwater of the Weibersbach in Albstadt.

== See also ==
- List of rivers of Bavaria
