= Hemsbach (Kahl) =

River in Germany

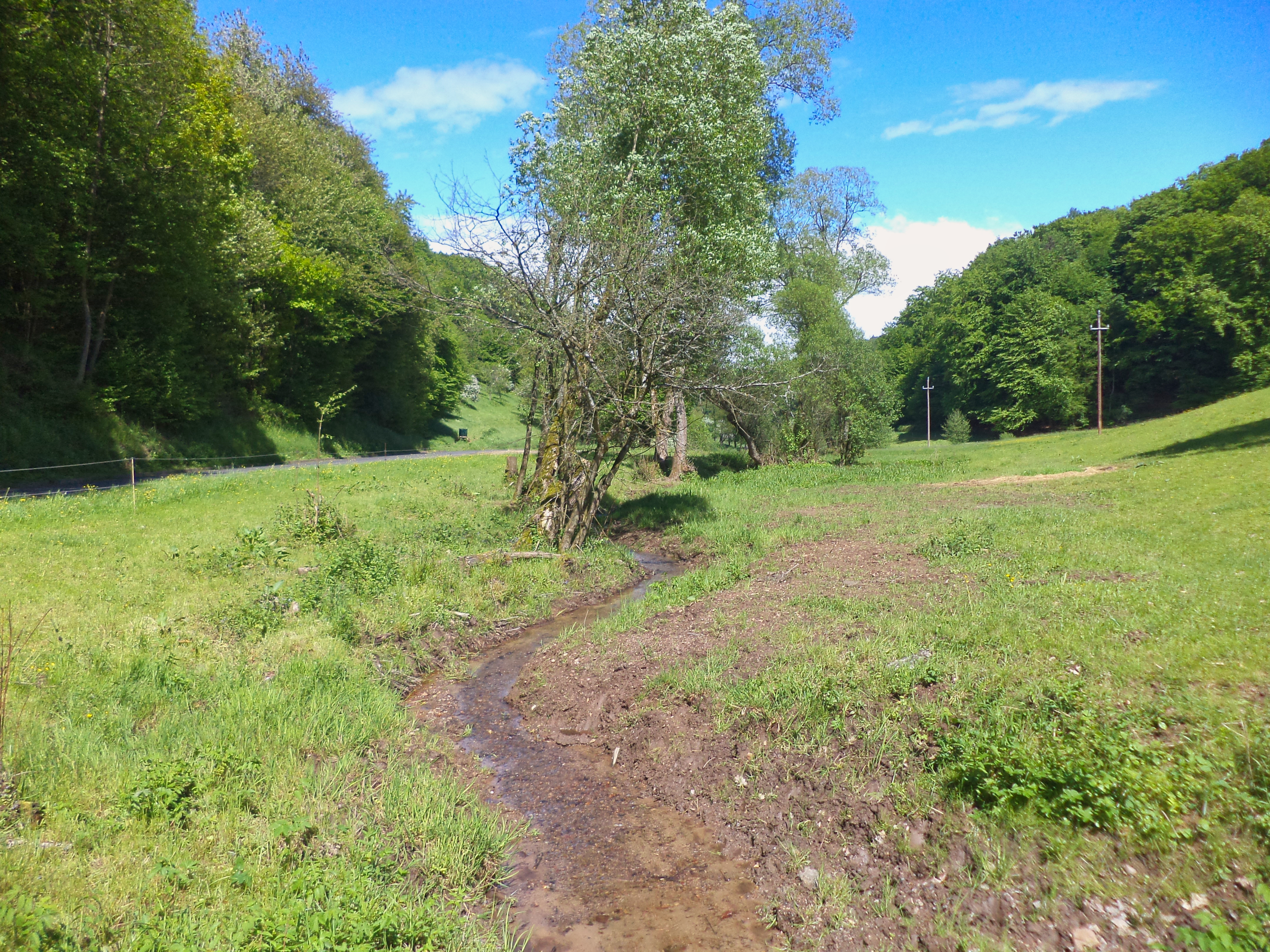
- The Hemsbach between Hemsbach and Brücken (Mömbris)

Location
- Country: Germany
- State: Bavaria
- District: Aschaffenburg

Physical characteristics
- Source
  - location: Southeast of Hemsbach
  - coordinates: 50°04′11″N 09°07′07″E
  - elevation: 345 m (377 yd) above sea level
- Mouth
  - location: at Brücken (Mömbris) in the Kahl
  - coordinates: 50°05′21″N 09°08′42″E
  - elevation: 155 m (170 yd) above sea level
- Length: 3.2 km (2.0 mi)

Basin features
- Progression: Kahl→ Main→ Rhine→ North Sea

Hemsbach (German pronunciation: [ˈhɛmsˌbax]) is a small river of Bavaria, Germany. It is a left tributary of the Kahl in Brücken (part of Mömbris).

== See also ==
- List of rivers of Bavaria
