= Kleinlaudenbach (Kahl) =

River in Germany

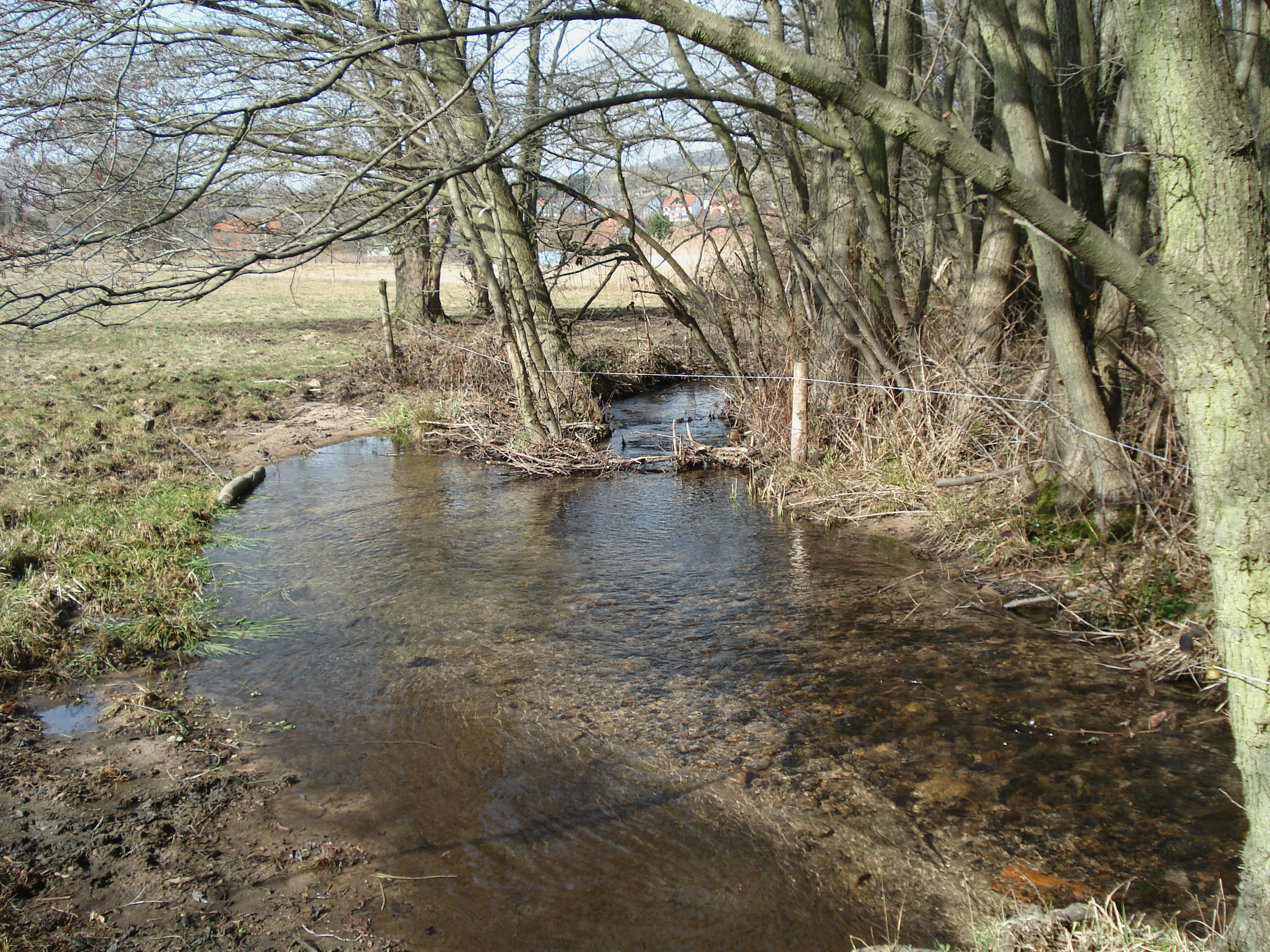

Location
- Country: Germany
- States: Bavaria

Physical characteristics
- Mouth
  - location: Kahl
  - coordinates: 50.1014°N 9.2674°E

Basin features
- Progression: Kahl→ Main→ Rhine→ North Sea

The Kleinlaudenbach, also called Kleiner Laudenbach, is a river of Bavaria, Germany. It is a left tributary of the Kahl near Kleinkahl.

The Kleinlaudenbach rises on the Degen-Weg in the Schöllkrippener Forest at the foot of the Eselshöhe ridge, below the Laudenberg (478 m).

== See also ==
- List of rivers of Bavaria
