= Kahl (surname) =

Kahl (German bald) is a surname. Notable people with the surname include:

- Alfred Kahl (1877–1946), German academic
- B. Michael Kahl (1941–2012), American public affairs consultant/lobbyist
- Bruno Kahl (1914–1999), German Wehrmacht officer
- Chris Kahl (born 1977), American musician
- Colin Kahl (born 1971), American gov official
- Daniel Kahl (born 1960), American-Japanese television personality
- Gordon Kahl (1920–1983), American animator
- Margot Kahl (born 1961), Chilean engineer and television host
- Milt Kahl (1909–1987), American animator
- Nick Kahl (politician) (born 1977), American politician
- Nick Kahl (baseball) (1879–1959), American baseball player
- Oscar Kahl (born 1997), Thai football player
- Thede Kahl (born 1971), German academic
