= Goldbach (Kahl) =

River in Germany

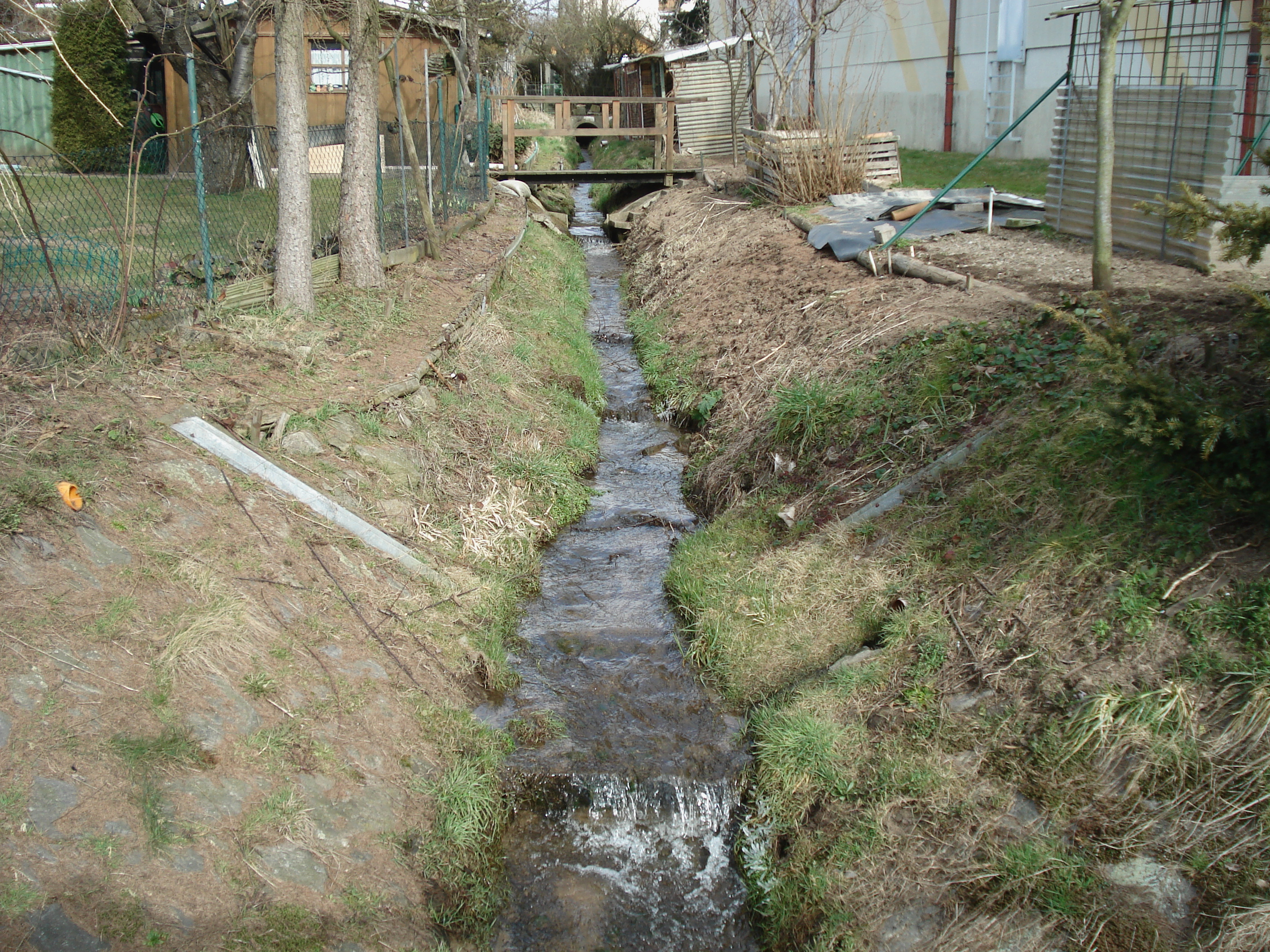
- The Goldbach in Michelbach

Location
- Country: Germany
- States: Bavaria

Physical characteristics
- Mouth
  - location: Kahl
  - coordinates: 50.0996°N 9.0990°E

Basin features
- Progression: Kahl→ Main→ Rhine→ North Sea

Goldbach (German pronunciation: [ˈɡɔltbax]) is a small river of Bavaria, Germany. It is a tributary of the Kahl near Alzenau.

== See also ==
- List of rivers of Bavaria
