= Weibersbach (Kahl, Schimborn) =

River in Germany

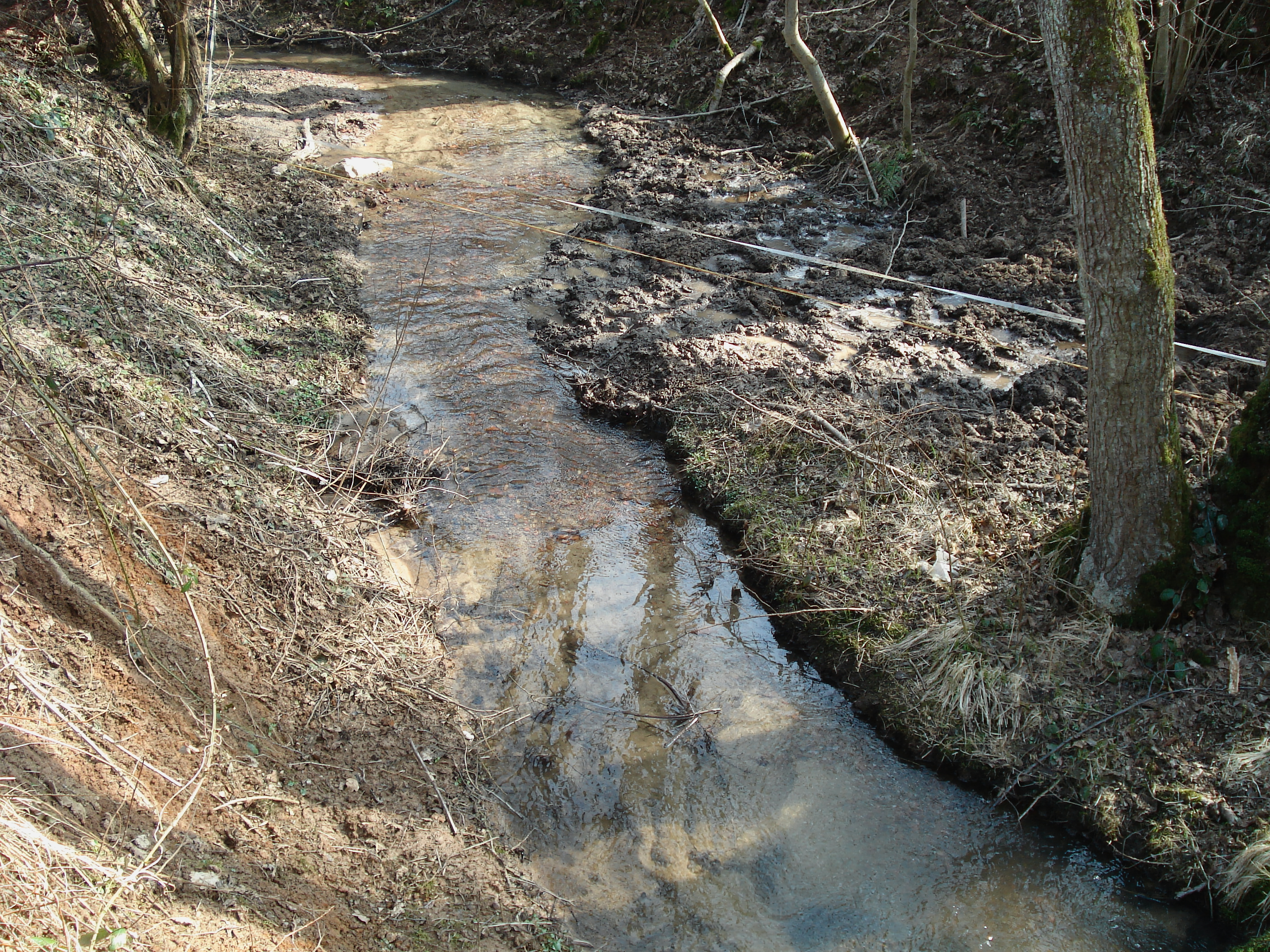

Location
- Country: Germany
- State: Bavaria

Physical characteristics
- Mouth
  - location: Kahl
  - coordinates: 50.0570°N 9.1883°E

Basin features
- Progression: Kahl→ Main→ Rhine→ North Sea

Weibersbach is a river of Bavaria, Germany. It is left tributary of the Kahl in Schimborn, a parish of Mömbris.

== See also ==
- List of rivers of Bavaria
