= Krombach (river) =

River in Germany

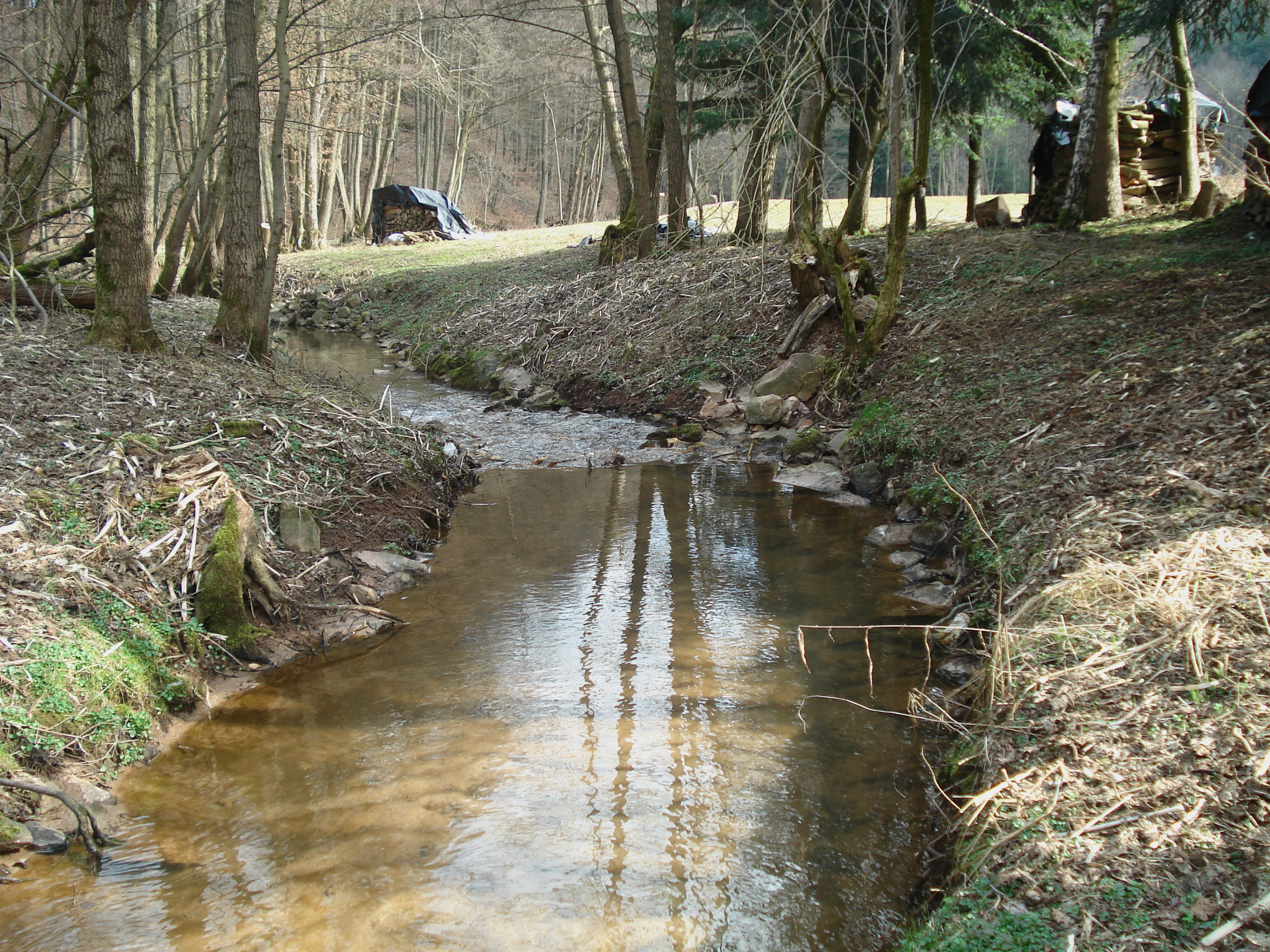
- The Krombach in Unterschur (part of the municipality Krombach)

Location
- Country: Germany
- States: Bavaria

Physical characteristics
- Mouth
  - location: Kahl
  - coordinates: 50.0626°N 9.2272°E

Basin features
- Progression: Kahl→ Main→ Rhine→ North Sea
- Tributaries
  - left: Ohlenbach
  - right: Gitzenbach

Krombach is a small river of Bavaria, Germany. It flows into the Kahl in Blankenbach. The name Krombach means "curved stream".

== See also ==
- List of rivers of Bavaria
