= Krebsbach (Kahl) =

River in Bavaria, Germany

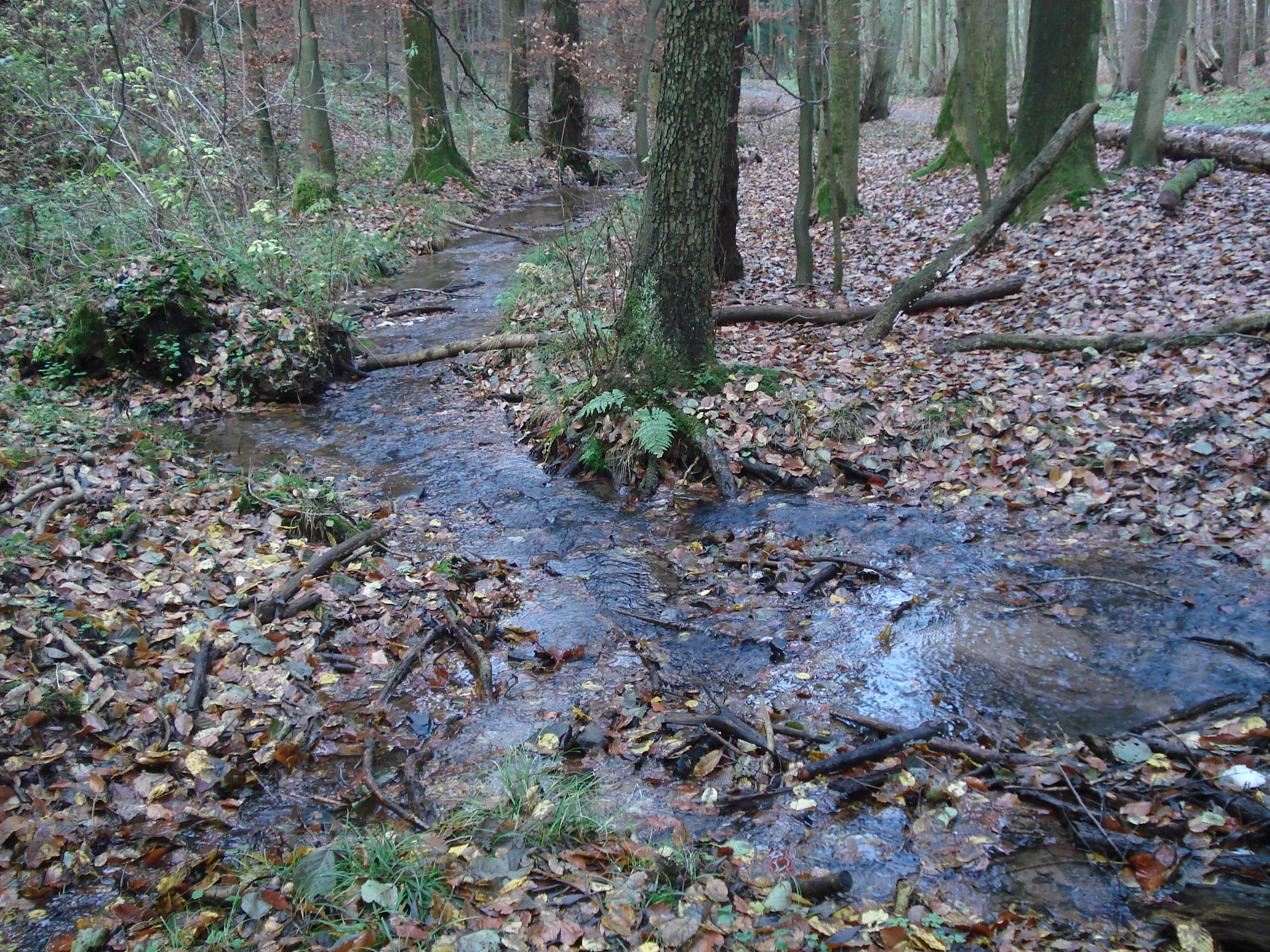
- The Krebsbach near the Burgstall Vergessene Burg

Location
- Country: Germany
- States: Bavaria

Physical characteristics
- Mouth
  - location: Kahl
  - coordinates: 50.0874°N 9.0757°E

Basin features
- Progression: Kahl→ Main→ Rhine→ North Sea

Krebsbach is a small river of Bavaria, Germany. It is a left tributary of the Kahl near Alzenau.

== See also ==
- List of rivers of Bavaria
