= Edelbach (Kahl) =

River in Bavaria, Germany

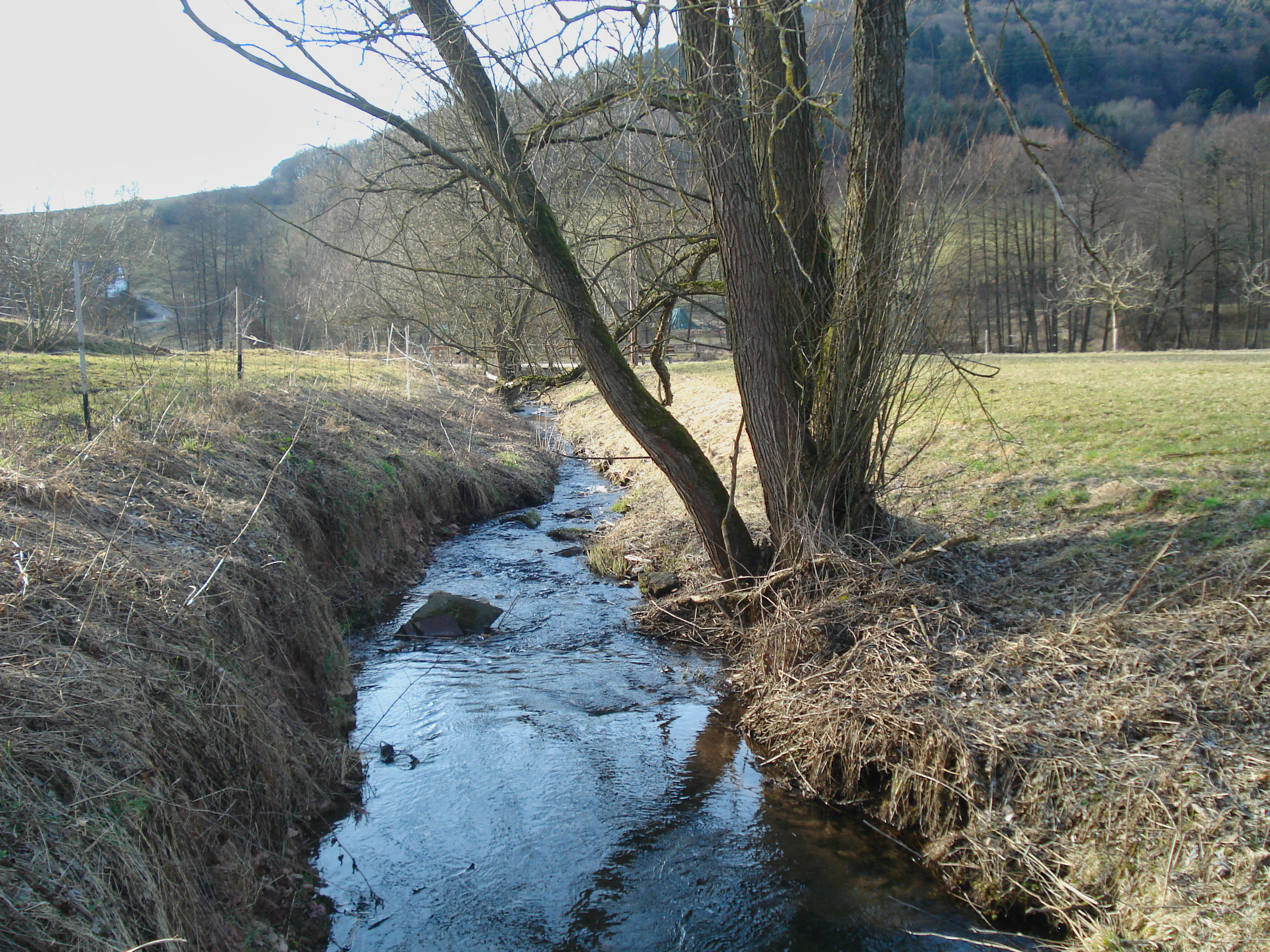
- The Edelbach north of the sawmill at the village Edelbach

Location
- Country: Germany
- State: Bavaria

Physical characteristics
- Source
  - location: southeast of Edelbach, (Kleinkahl)
  - elevation: 334 metres (1,096 ft) above sea level (Normalhöhennull)
- Mouth
  - location: west of Edelbach into the Kahl
  - coordinates: 50.1124°N 9.2823°E
  - elevation: 238 metres (781 ft) above sea level (Normalhöhennull)
- Length: 2.6 km (1.6 mi)
- Basin size: about 4.2 square kilometres (1.6 sq mi)

Basin features
- Progression: Kahl→ Main→ Rhine→ North Sea

The Edelbach is a small river of the district Aschaffenburg in the Bavarian part of the Spessart, Germany.

It is a left tributary of the Kahl. The Edelbach gave its name to the village of Edelbach in Kleinkahl. Up to the 20th century, both the river and the village bore the name Ölbach.

== Course ==
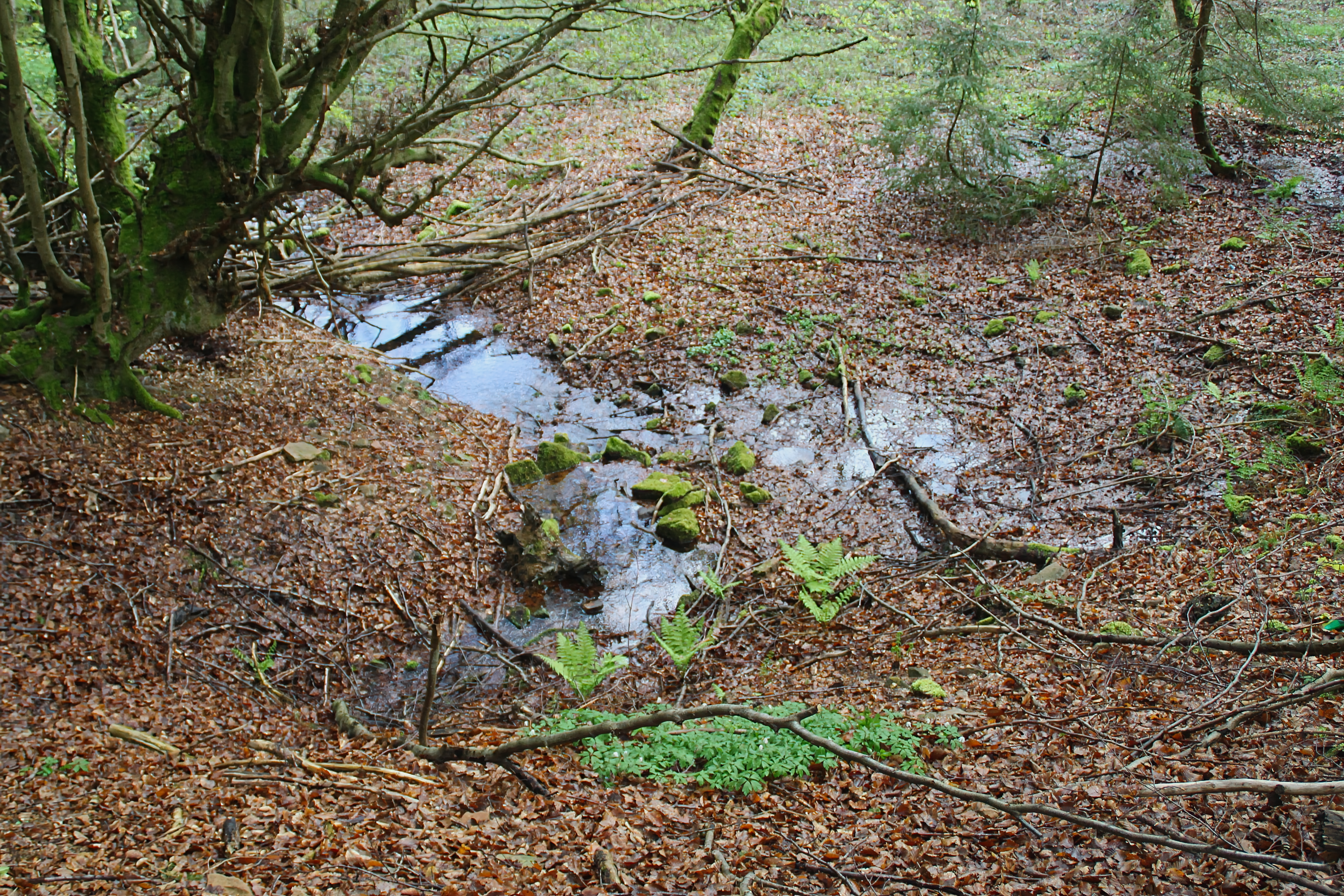
The main source of the Edelbach

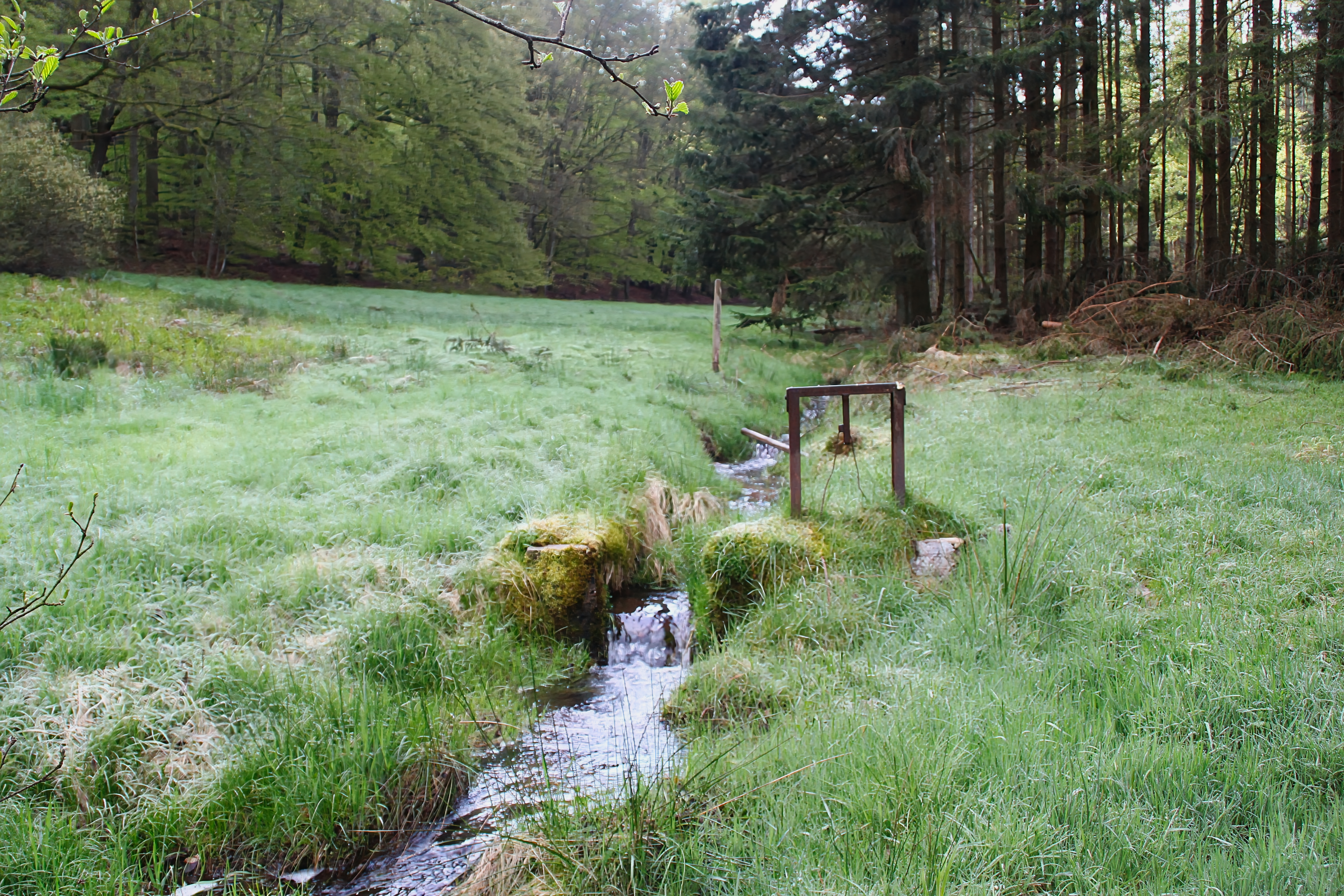
The Edelbach below its sources

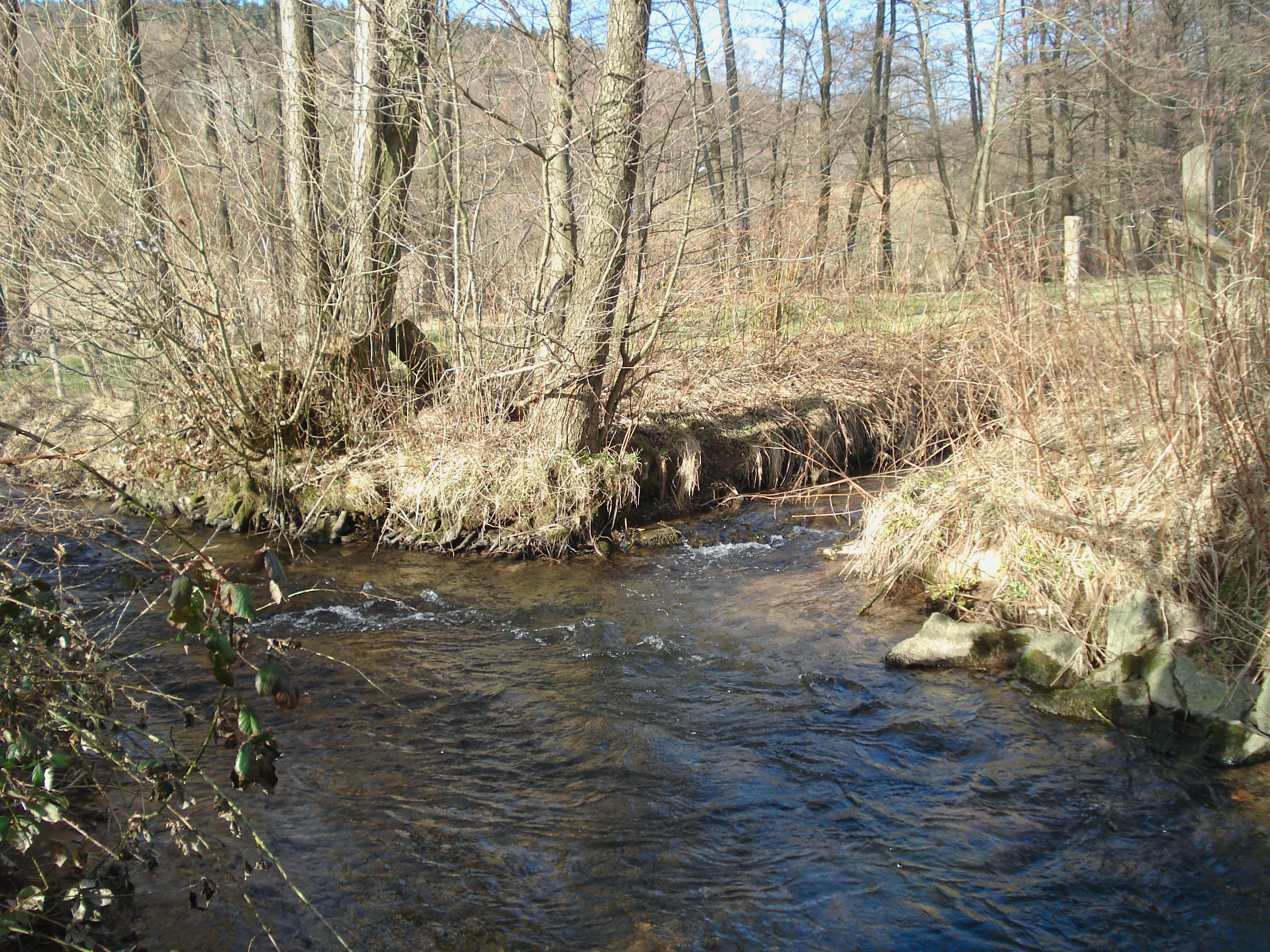
The Edelbach (on the right) flowing into the Kahl

The Edelbach springs in a forest at the foot of the back of the mountain Eselshöhe, below the mountain Edelberg 477 metres (1,565 ft), between its two northern foothills, Sommerberg 466 metres (1,529 ft) and Ölberg 461 metres (1,512 ft). The springs are located in the 130 metres (430 ft) deep notched Ringgrund on the left mountain side. The main source is located on the boundary to the unincorporated area Gemarkung Schöllkrippener Forst, below the hiking trail K2. The drainage basin above ground is about 4 square kilometres (1.5 sq mi) and reaches up to the Spessart-Höhenstraße (a scenic route). The Ringgrund from there to the spring is a dry valley.

The Edelbach runs parallel to the Kreisstraße AB 20 to the north-west. After about 250 metres (820 ft), during which it declines about 20 metres (66 ft), it leaves the forest. Here it is strengthened by a larger spring at a forest house and the brook from the Kafloosquelle. In the village Edelbach, which is part of Kleinkahl, it is crossed by the Degen-Weg, a hiking trail, then takes up the water of other springs. In older times, it drove a sawmill there. North of the sawmill, opposite a Kneipp water-treading basin, it crosses the Kahltal-Spessart cycle path and flows into the Kahl.

== History ==
At the spring of the Edelbach, in the late Middle Ages or in the early modern times, a now abandoned glass hut was situated. Its former location is now protected as a ground monument. Immediately to the east, there was the quarry from which the raw materials were extracted.

== See also ==
- List of rivers of Bavaria
