= Blankenbach (Kahl) =

River in Germany

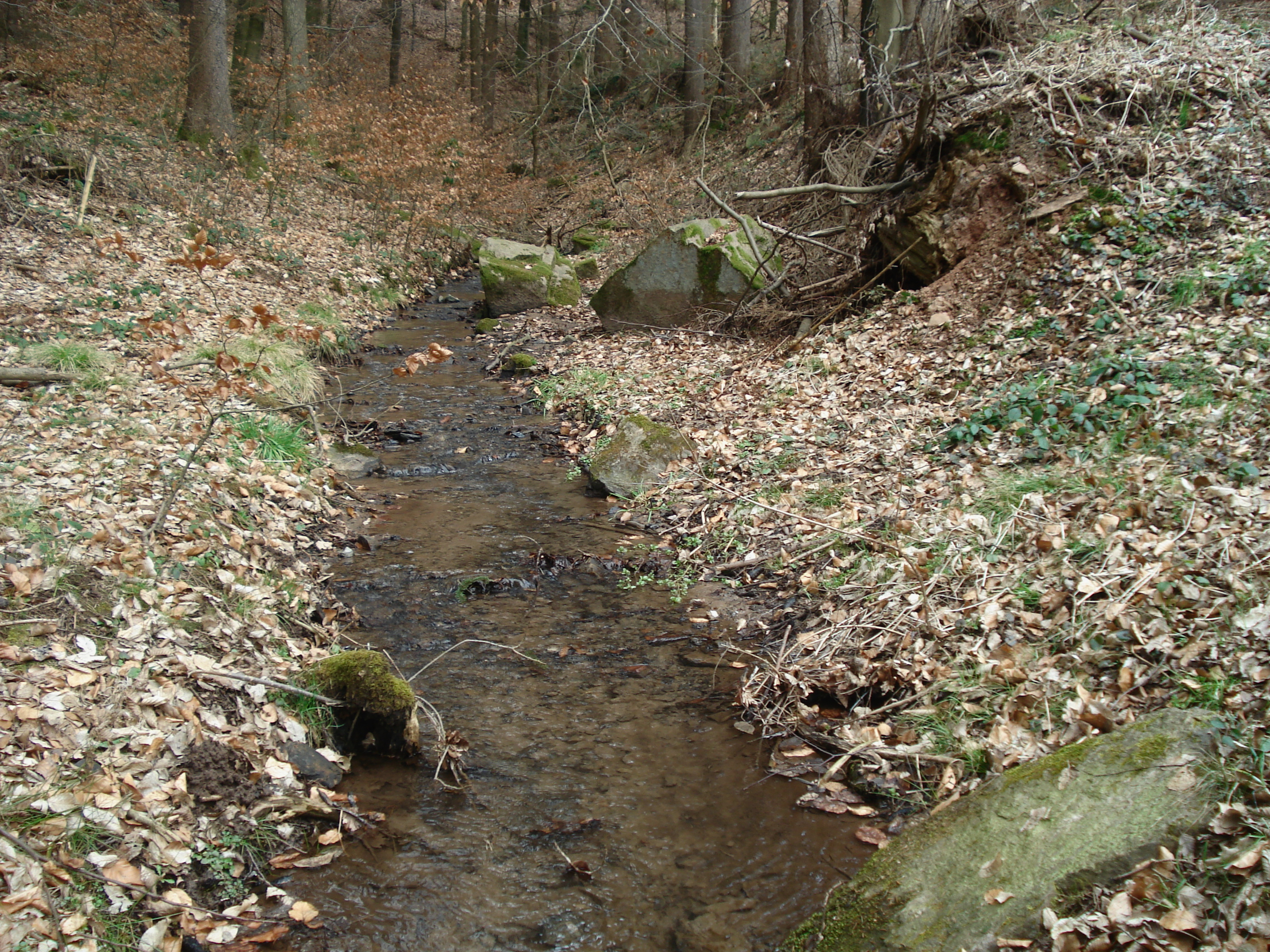
- Blankenbach upstream of the community Kleinblankenbach

Location
- Country: Germany
- State: Bavaria

Physical characteristics
- Source
  - location: in Fallborn, west of Eichenberg (Sailauf)
  - elevation: 295 metres (968 ft)
- Mouth
  - location: at Kleinblankenbach (community of Blankenbach in the Kahl
  - coordinates: 50.0653°N 9.2305°E
  - elevation: 190 metres (620 ft)
- Length: 1.7 km (1.1 mi)

Basin features
- Progression: Kahl→ Main→ Rhine→ North Sea

Blankenbach is a small river of Bavaria, Germany.

It is a left tributary of the Kahl in the district Aschaffenburg of the Bavarian Spessart.

Originally Blankenbach means as much as blinking brook. The stream gave its name to the municipality Blankenbach.

The Blankenbach springs from Fallborn, between Eichenberg (Sailauf) and Blankenbach. It runs through a ravine in a north-westerly direction to Kleinblankenbach (a community of Blankenbach). In front of the sports field it flows into a piping. Below the bridge Kahlbrücke, opposite the railway station of the railway Kahlgrundbahn, it flows into the Kahl.

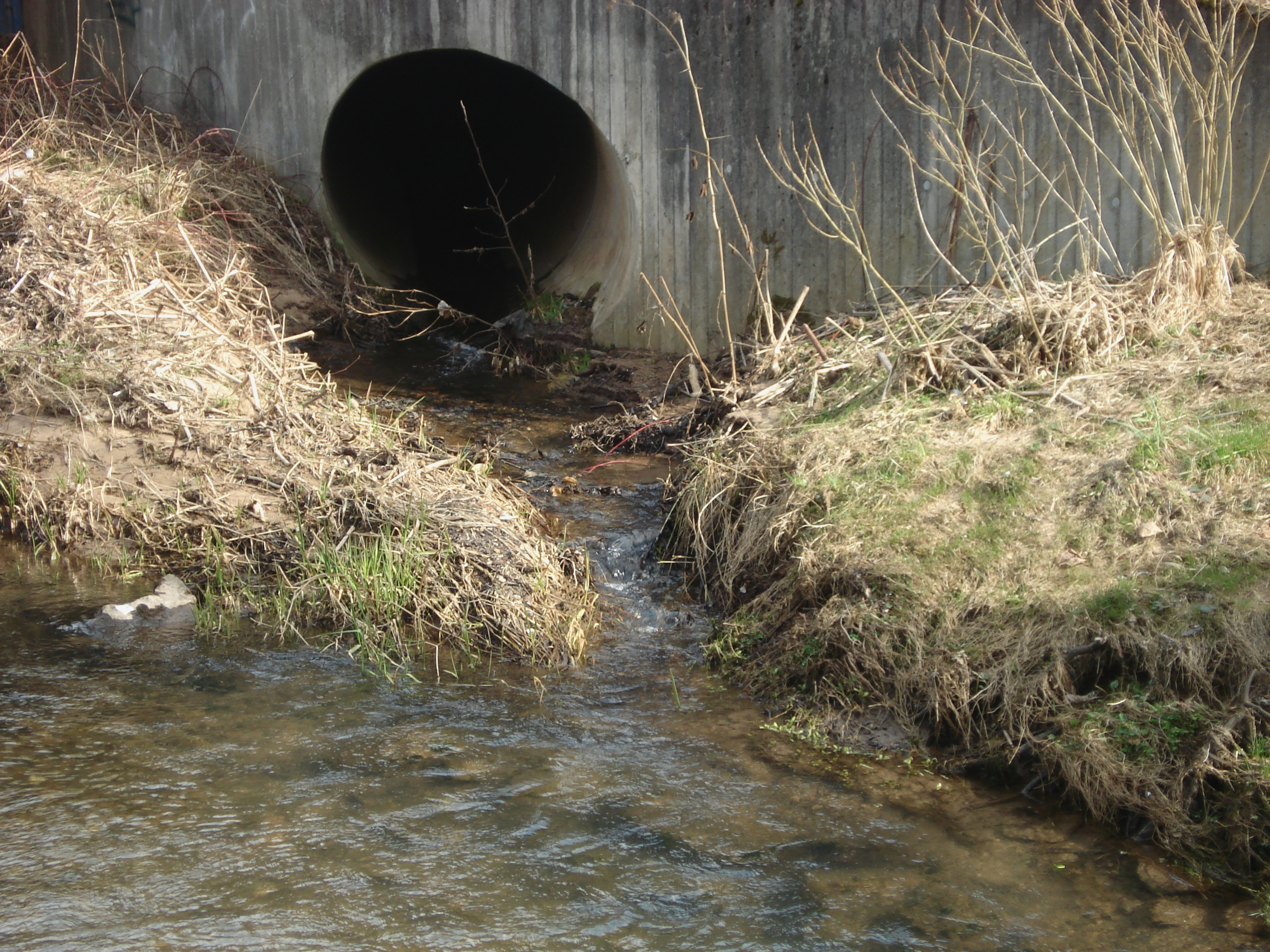
The Blankenbach at its mouth flowing into the Kahl

== See also ==
- List of rivers of Bavaria
