= Neuwiesenbach =

River in Germany

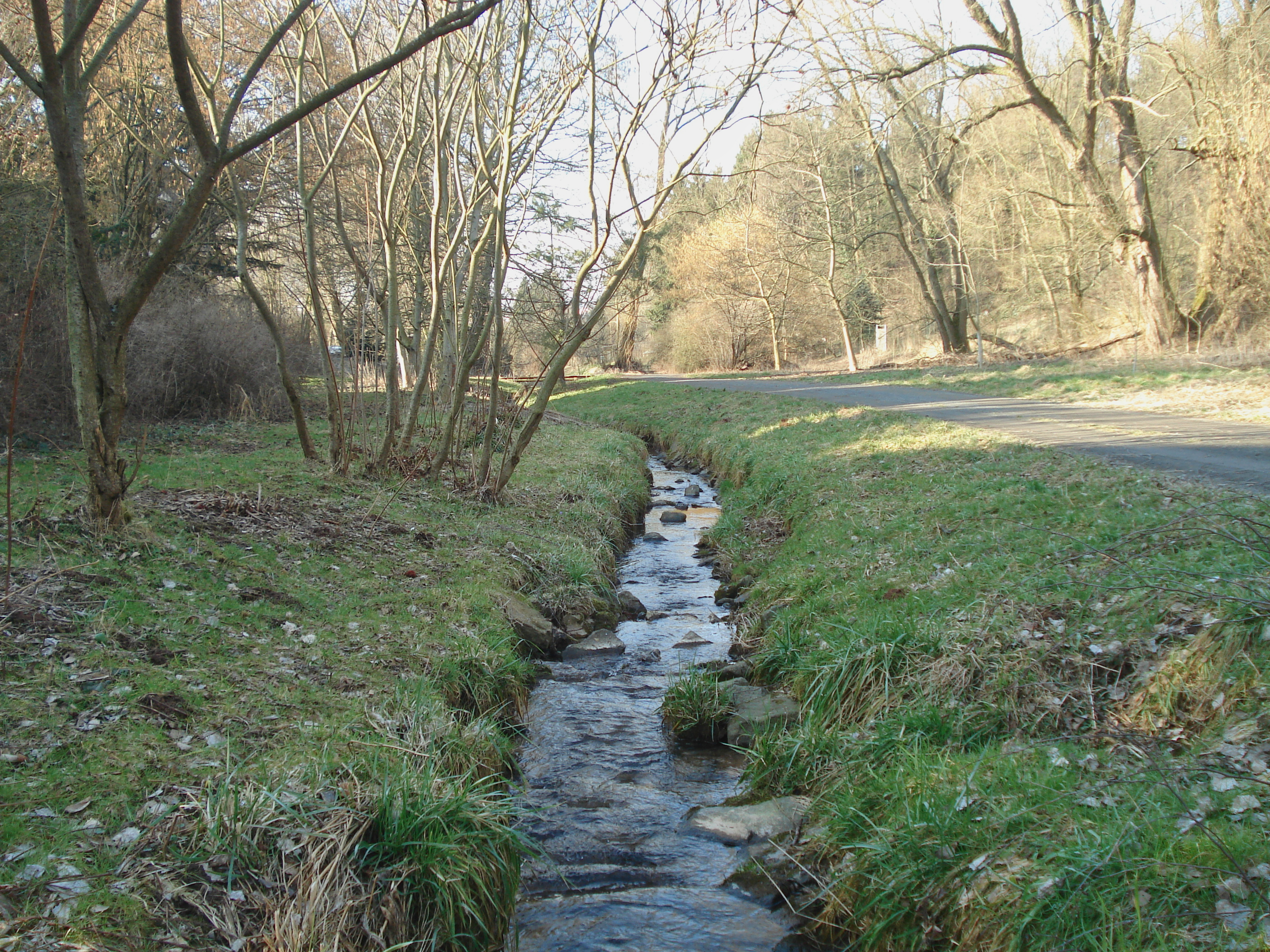
- The Neuwiesenbach at Alzenau

Location
- Country: Germany
- States: Bavaria

Physical characteristics
- Mouth
  - location: Kahl
  - coordinates: 50.0849°N 9.0723°E

Basin features
- Progression: Kahl→ Main→ Rhine→ North Sea

Neuwiesenbach is a small river of Bavaria, Germany. It flows into the Kahl in Alzenau.

== Course ==
Neuwiesenbach is a tributary of the Kahl in the district of Aschaffenburg, Bavaria. The stream joins the Kahl in the town of Alzenau and forms part of the Kahl river system in the Lower Franconia region.

The stream is approximately 3 km (1.9 mi) long.

== See also ==
- List of rivers of Bavaria
