= Sommerkahl (Kahl) =

River in Germany

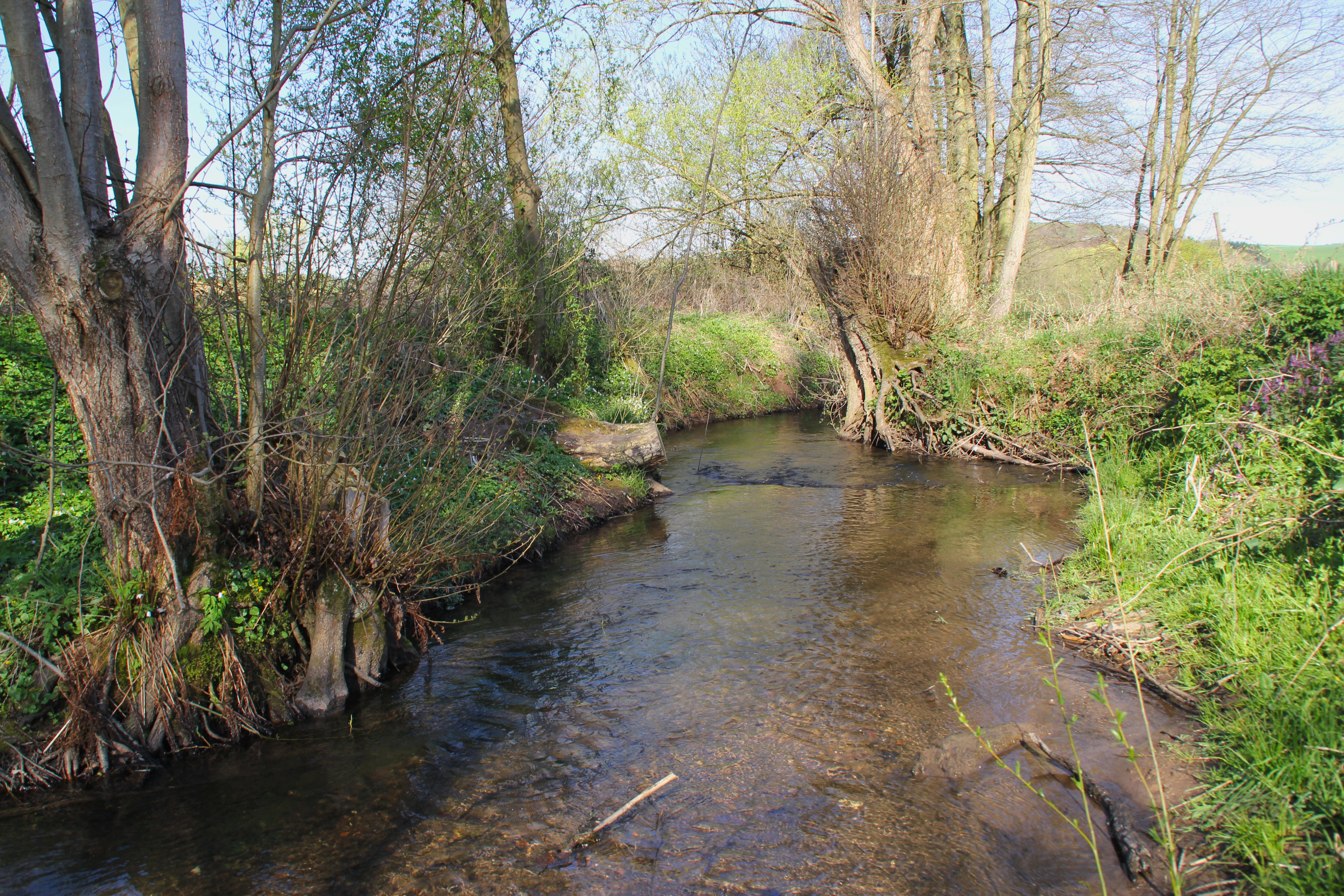
- The Sommerkahl west of Sommerkahl

Location
- Country: Germany
- State: Bavaria

Physical characteristics
- Source
  - location: near Sommerkahl
- Mouth
  - location: near Schöllkrippen-Langenborn in the Kahl
  - coordinates: 50°04′27″N 9°14′15″E

Basin features
- Progression: Kahl→ Main→ Rhine→ North Sea

The Sommerkahl (in its upper course: Speckkahl) is a small river in the northern Spessart region in Lower Franconia, Bavaria, Germany. Near Langenborn (part of Schöllkrippen) the Sommerkahl empties from the left into the Kahl. Together with the Westerbach, Reichenbach and Geiselbach, the Sommerkahl is one of the largest tributaries of the Kahl.

== See also ==
- List of rivers of Bavaria
