= Kleine Kahl =

River in Germany

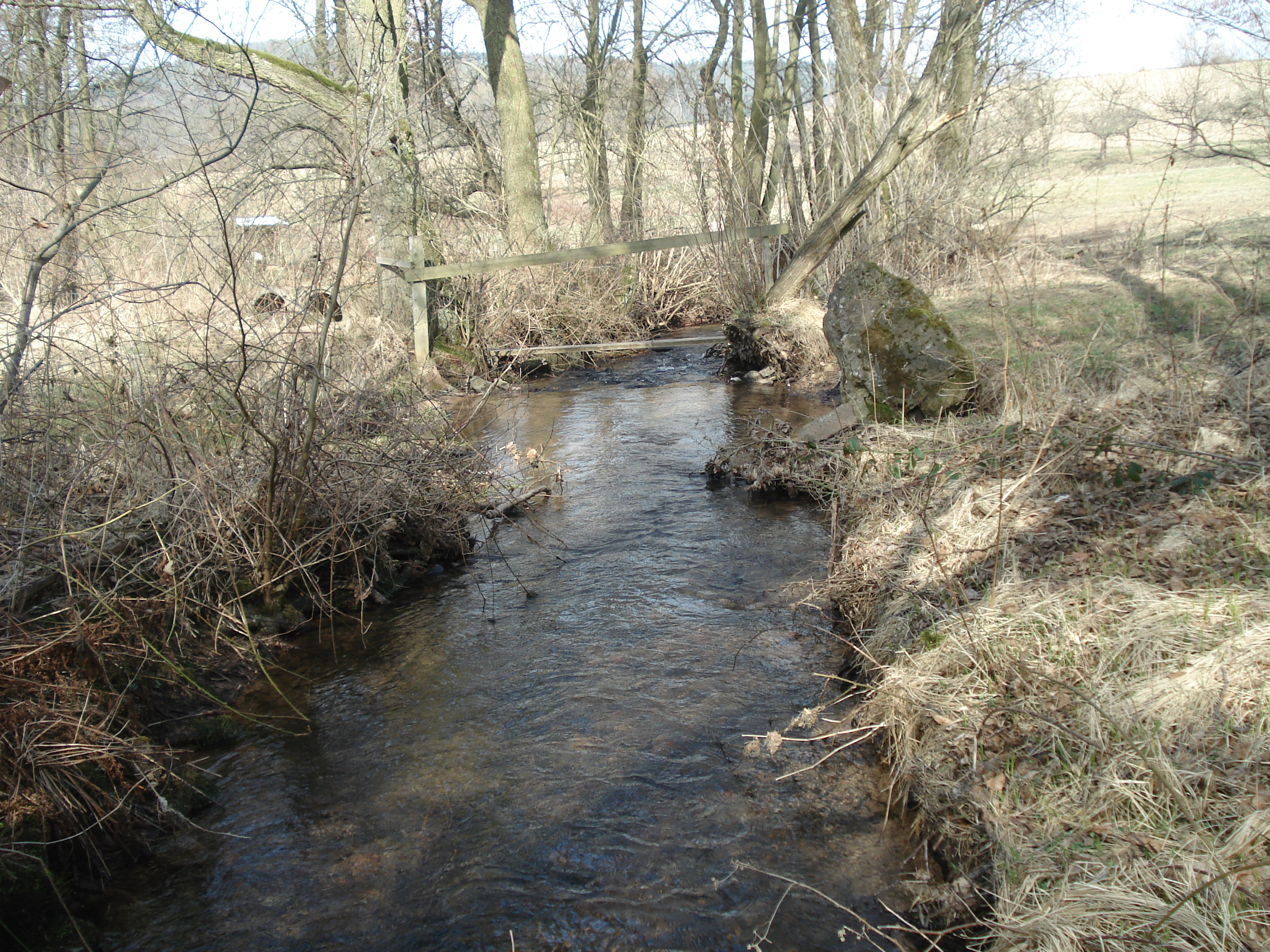
- The Kleine Kahl before Kleinkahl

Location
- Country: Germany
- State: Bavaria

Physical characteristics
- Source
  - location: near Kleinkahl
  - coordinates: 50°05′36″N 9°18′39″E
- Mouth
  - location: in Kleinkahl in the Kahl
  - coordinates: 50°06′24″N 9°16′29″E
- Length: ca. 3.5 km

Basin features
- Progression: Kahl→ Main→ Rhine→ North Sea

The Kleine Kahl ("Little Kahl") is a left tributary of the Kahl in the northern Spessart in Lower Franconia, Bavaria, Germany. The spring is located about 2 km southeast of Kleinkahl, where it flows into the Kahl.

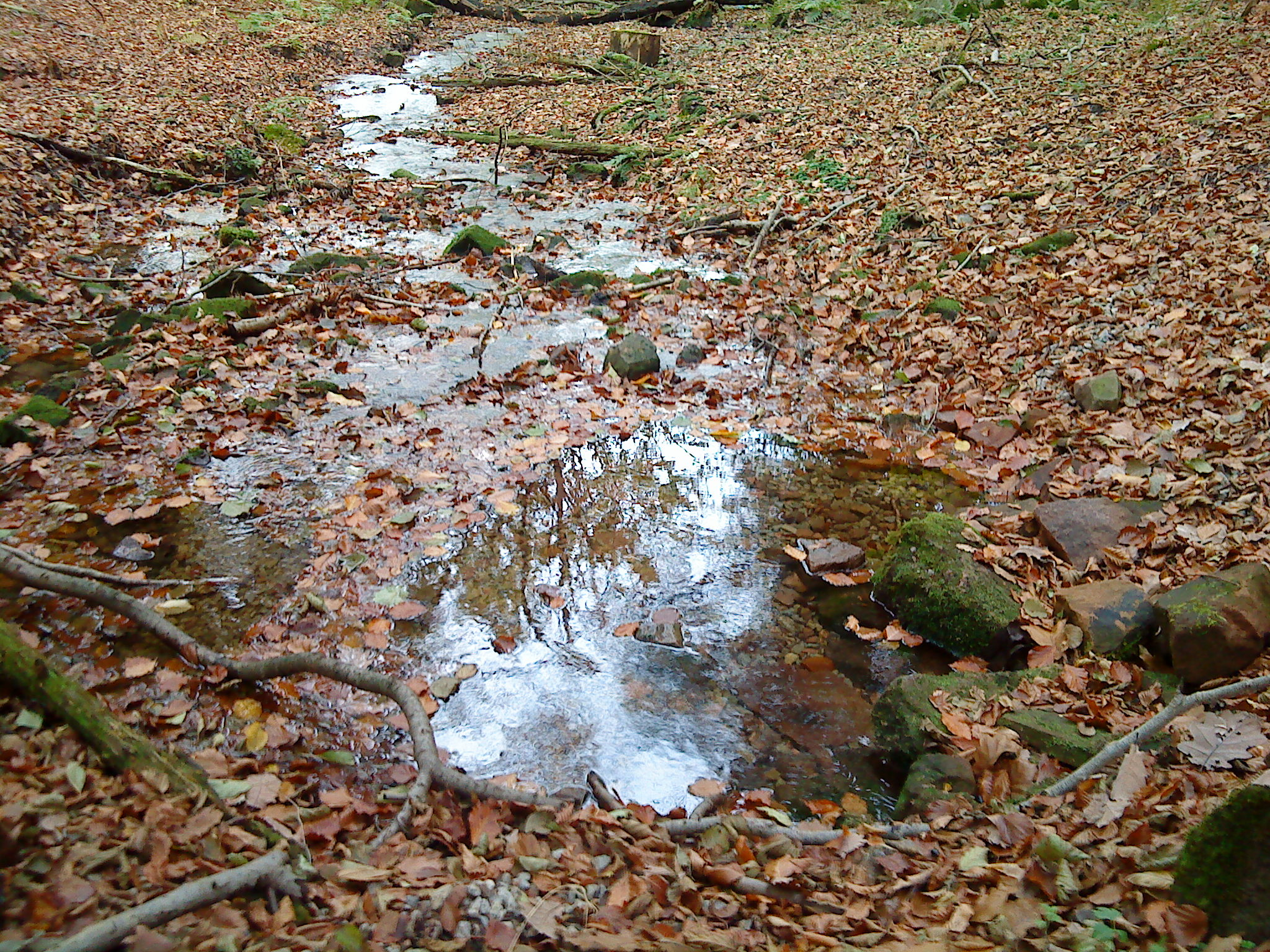
The spring of the Kleine Kahl

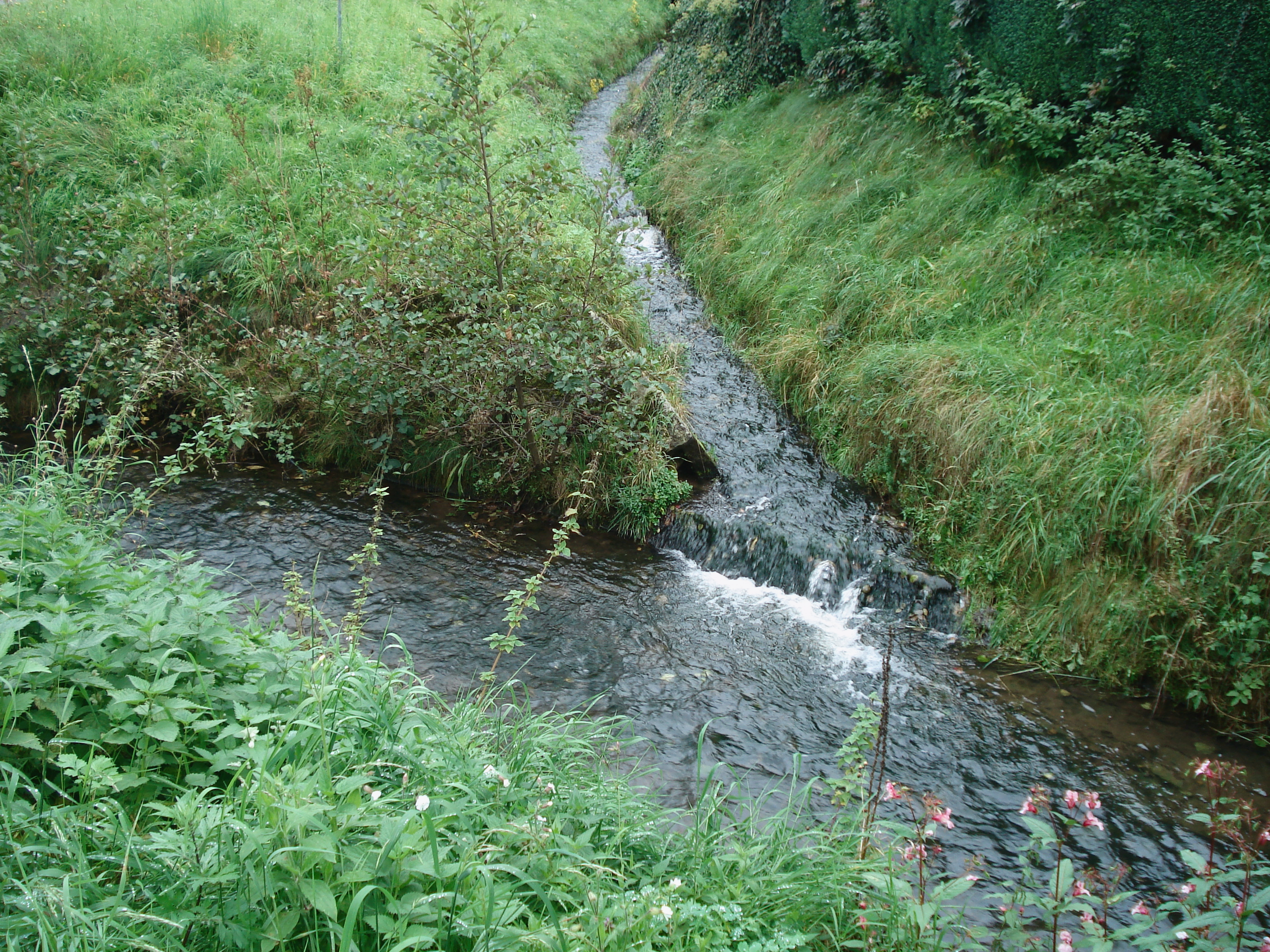
Mouth in the Kahl
