= Weibersbach (Kahl, Michelbach) =

River in Bavaria, Germany

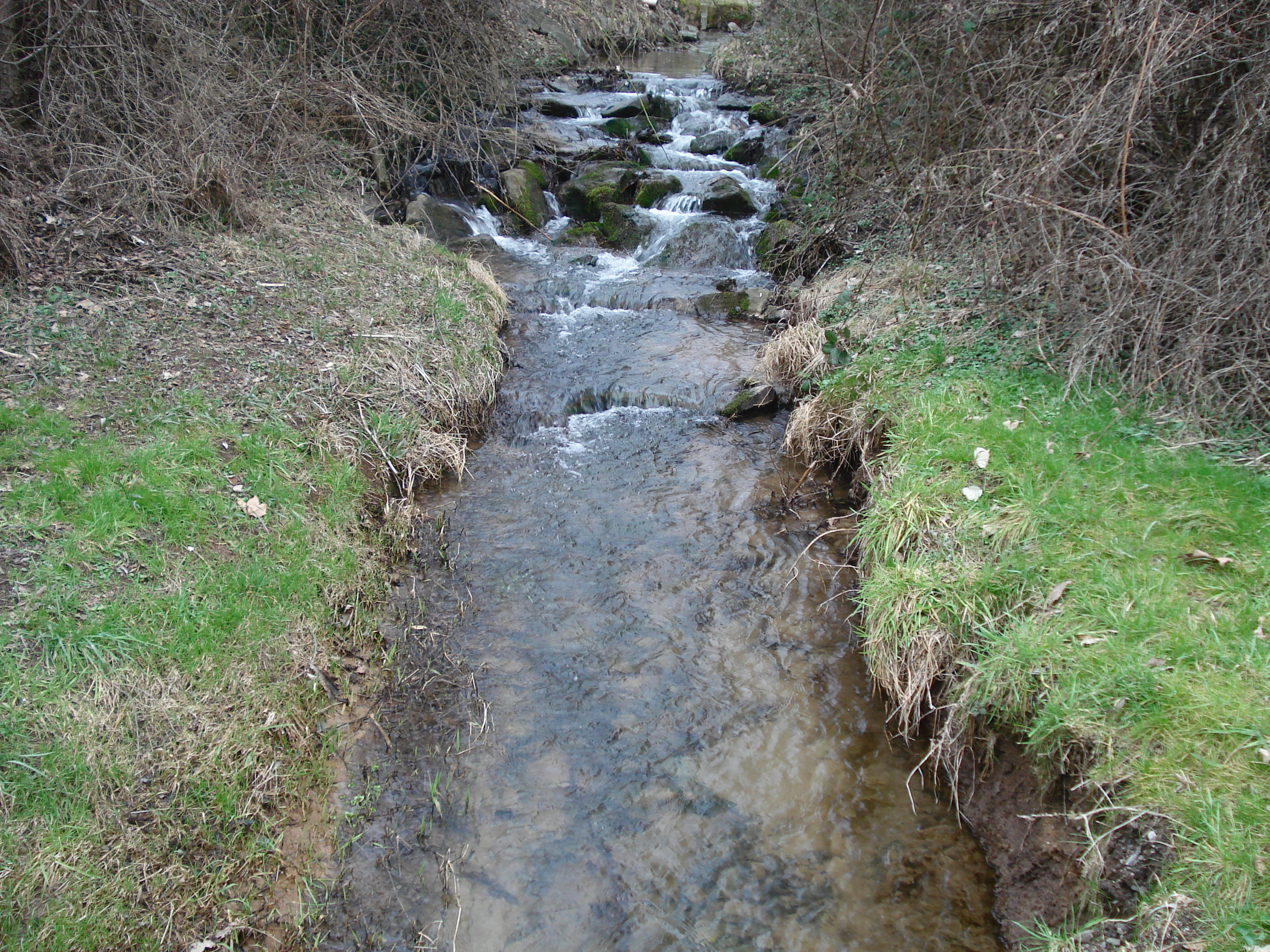
- The Weibersbach behind the castle in Michelbach

Location
- Country: Germany
- State: Bavaria

Physical characteristics
- Mouth
  - location: Kahl
  - coordinates: 50.1010°N 9.1030°E

Basin features
- Progression: Kahl→ Main→ Rhine→ North Sea
- Tributaries
  - left: Wehmig

Weibersbach, partly also called Albstädter Bach or Michelbach, is a small river of Bavaria, Germany. It is right tributary of the Kahl in Michelbach. It originates in the northeastern part of Albstadt, a district of Alzenau, from the confluence of the Eichbach and Wehmig (also called Wehmigbach).

== See also ==
- List of rivers of Bavaria
