= Chris Kahl =

American musician (born 1977)

Chris Kahl (born January 2, 1977, in Rockledge, Florida) is an American musician best known for his songs about his home state of Florida.

== Early years ==
Chris Kahl was born and raised on the Space Coast of Florida where he began playing guitar as a teenager. After graduating from Merritt Island High School in 1995, he attended Rollins College in Winter Park, Florida, where he studied Economics and earned an MBA. During his time in college he performed locally in a band called Chris Kahl and the B-Sides.

Disenchanted with the American music scene, Kahl moved to London in the summer of 2000. He formed a new version of Chris Kahl and the B-Sides and recorded The Odessa Morning EP in 2003. But after unsuccessful attempts to obtain a record deal, the group disbanded.

== Busking ==
To earn a living during this time, Kahl began busking in the London Underground. Joining a licensing scheme sponsored by Carling, he performed at stations around Central London including Charing Cross and Tottenham Court Road. While busking, he came to the attention of producers of the BBC radio show BBC Radio 5 Live, who invited him to perform on the air.

Kahl also performed regularly at open mics around the city, most notably the Spice of Life pub. A performance of his song "Holloway Road" was filmed at the locale, and later aired on the TV program Kensington Wives.

Kahl also spent a lot of time at the Troubadour Café in the Earls Court section of London, writing songs and conversing with other musicians. Here he opened shows for Isaac Guillory, Wizz Jones, and the Flynn Brothers. He released Up From the Underground in 2004, which chronicled his time in London.

== Florida Music ==
Kahl stated that he wrote the album Orange Blossom Memories to combat homesickness during his time abroad. The album is made up entirely of songs about Florida (some of them historical) and was released in January 2006. “Floridiana Hotel”, from the album, won an award as one of the top 10 new Florida songs of 2006. In July 2006, Kahl performed "Rocket Boys", a tribute to the space program, at an anniversary celebration of the Apollo Moon Landing at Space Coast Stadium.

Once again based in Florida, Kahl continues to perform at folk festivals around the state. In the liner notes of Orange Blossom Memories he has stated that he has written an unpublished novel titled Exile on Duval St.

== Discography ==
- 1998 – Chris Kahl
- 2003 – The Odessa Morning EP
- 2004 – Up From the Underground
- 2006 – Orange Blossom Memories

== Related Sites ==
- Official Website
- Chris Kahl myspace

== Sources ==
- Florida Today article - January 11, 2006
- Florida Today article - July 26, 2006
- Jam Florida Music Magazine article - September 10–23, 1999
- Chris Kahl website
- Chris Kahl myspace
- Videos with music by Chris Kahl
