= Kahl (river) =

River in Germany

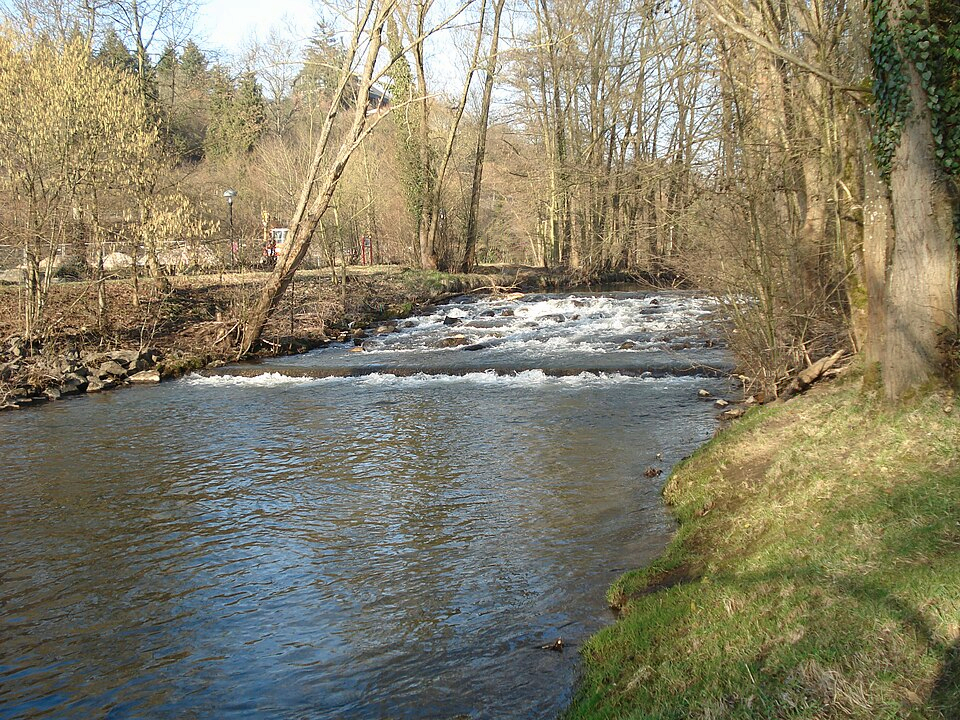
- Kahl in Alzenau

Location
- Country: Germany
- States: Bavaria and Hesse
- Reference no.: DE: 24772

Physical characteristics
- Source
  - location: near Kleinkahl
  - coordinates: 50°07′17″N 9°18′59″E
- Mouth
  - location: in Kahl into the Main
  - coordinates: 50°03′59″N 8°59′29″E
- Length: 35.6 km (22.1 mi)
- Basin size: 206 km^{2} (80 sq mi)
- Discharge
  - average: 1.89 m^{3}/s (67 cu ft/s)

Basin features
- Progression: Main→ Rhine→ North Sea

The Kahl (German pronunciation: [kaːl]) is a river in the northern Spessart in Bavaria and Hesse, Germany. It is a right tributary of the Main and is 35.6 km (22.1 mi) long. The name Kahl comes from the Old High German word kaldaha, which means cool and clear. The Kahl rises from two sources left and right of the road at the foot of the Spessart hills, near Kleinkahl. These springs produce 50–60 litres per second. The Kahl flows into the Main in Kahl am Main near the old Kahl Nuclear Power Plant. The largest tributaries are Westerbach, Sommerkahl, Reichenbach and Geiselbach.

== Tributaries ==
Tributaries from source to mouth:

Left

- Büchelbach
- Edelbach
- Kleine Kahl
- Kleinlaudenbach
- Höllenbach
- Sommerkahl
- Blankenbach
- Erlenbach
- Feldkahl
- Weibersbach (not to be confused with the right tributary)
- Reichenbach
- Forstgraben
- Rappach
- Fleutersbach
- Hemsbach
- Hitziger Lochgraben
- Kertelbach
- Krebsbach
- Neuwiesenbach

Right

- Lindenbach
- Habersbach
- Westerbach
- Krombach
- Sterzenbach
- Schloßgrundgraben
- Oberschurbach
- Steinbach
- Geiselbach
- Wolfsbach
- Weibersbach (not to be confused with the left tributary)
- Goldbach
- Streu
- Sälzerbach

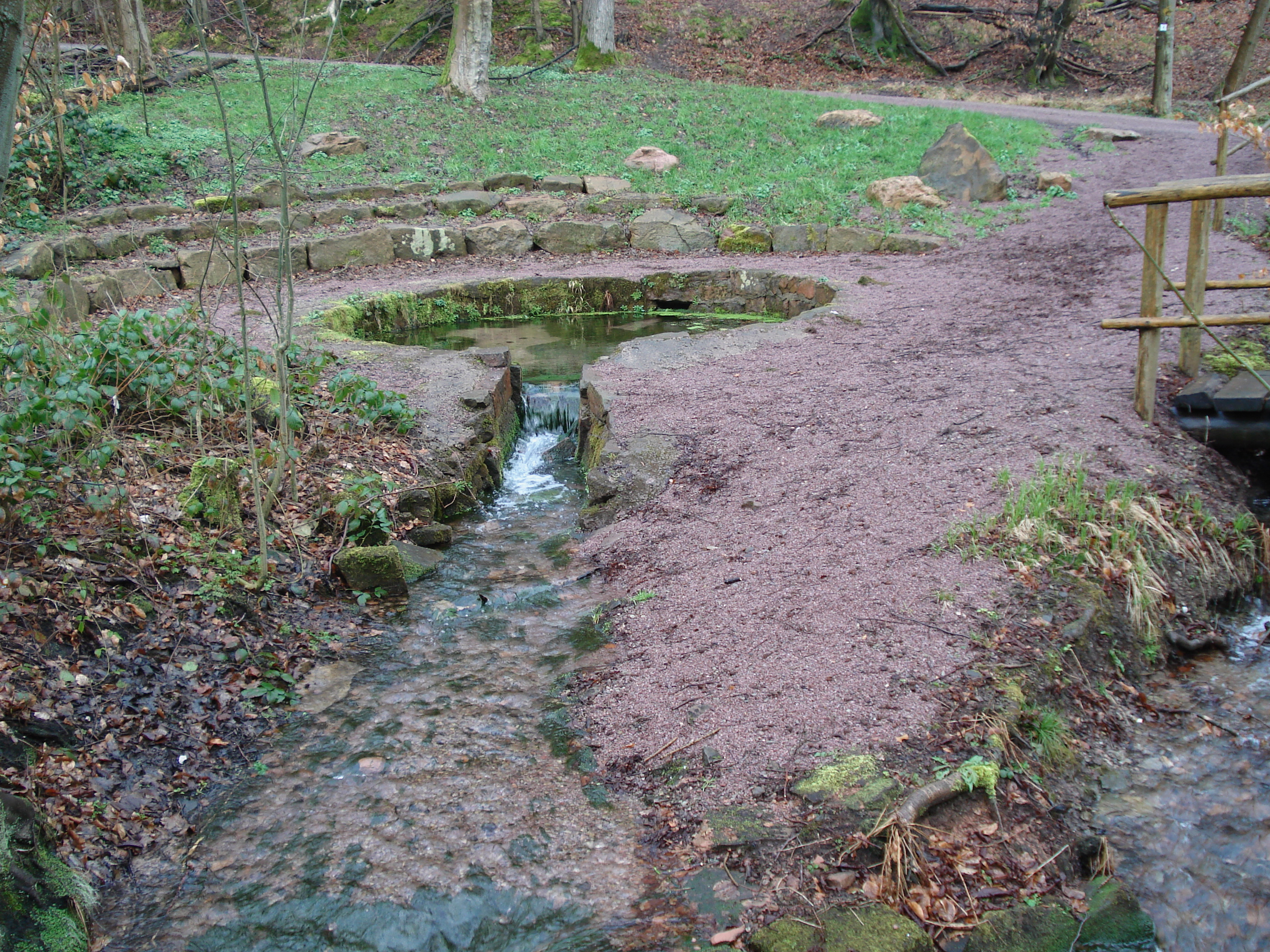
The right spring of the Kahl

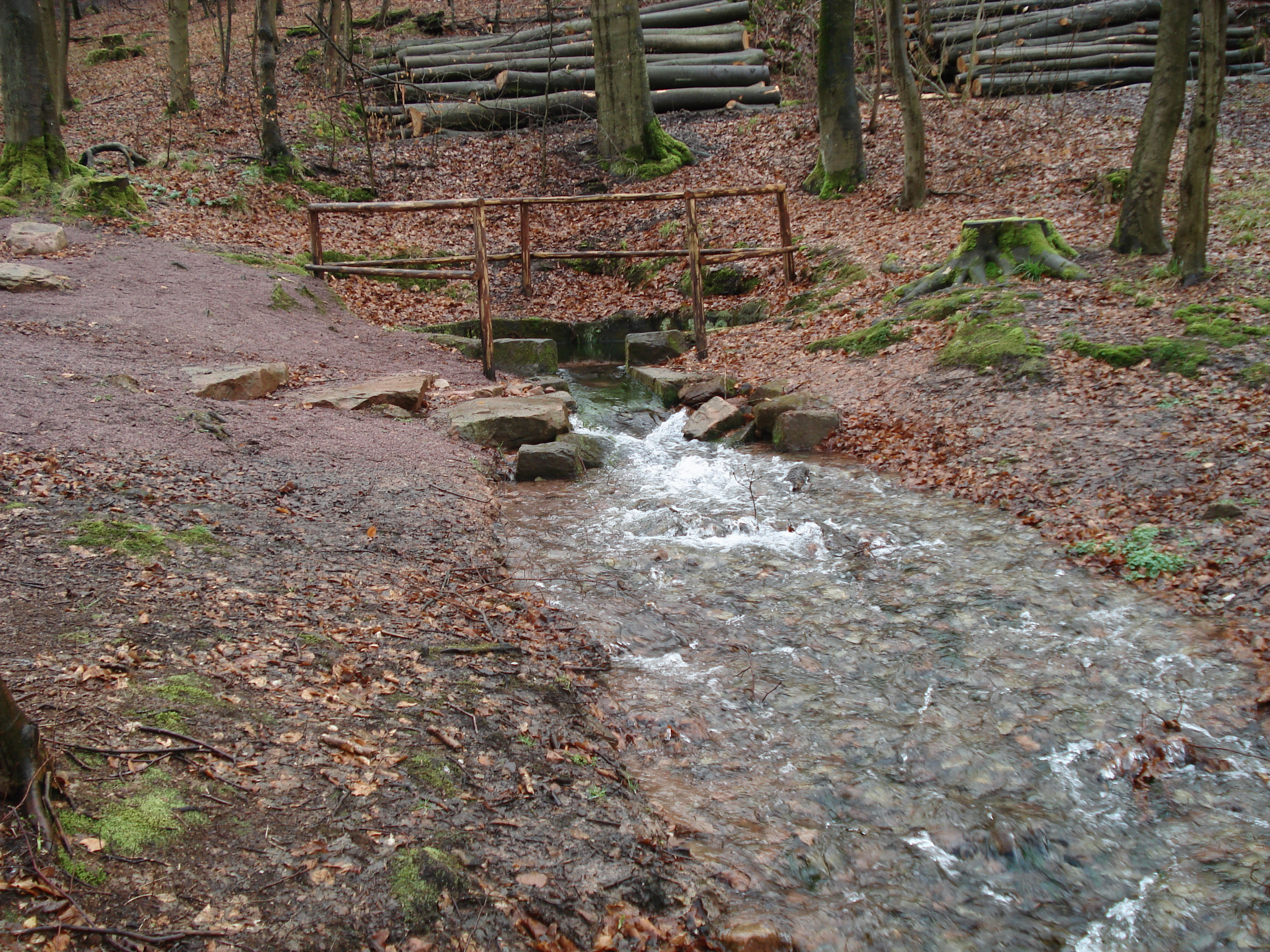
The left spring

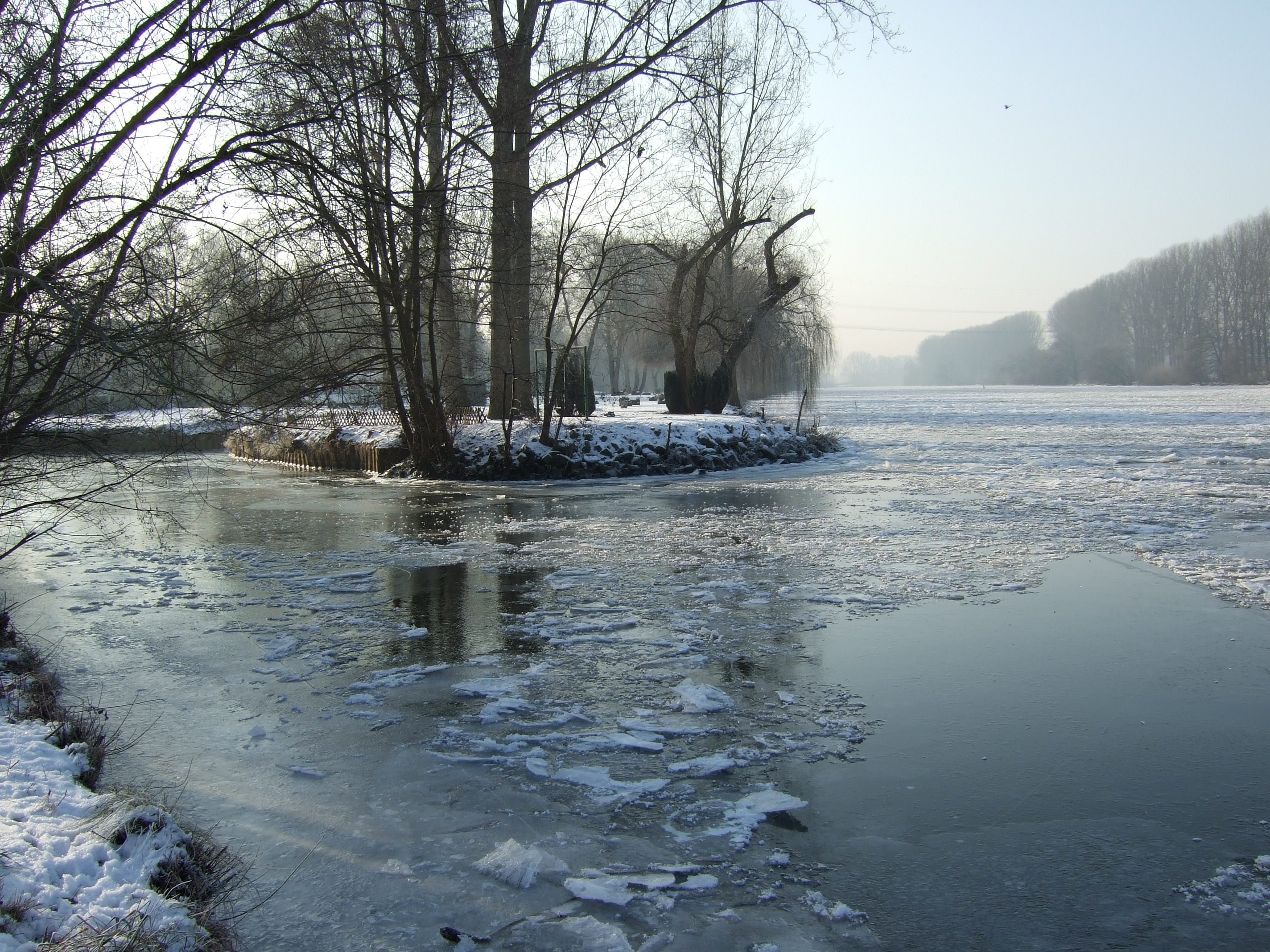
Mouth in the river Main

== See also ==
- List of rivers of Bavaria
- List of rivers of Hesse
