= Kleinkahl =

- Municipality
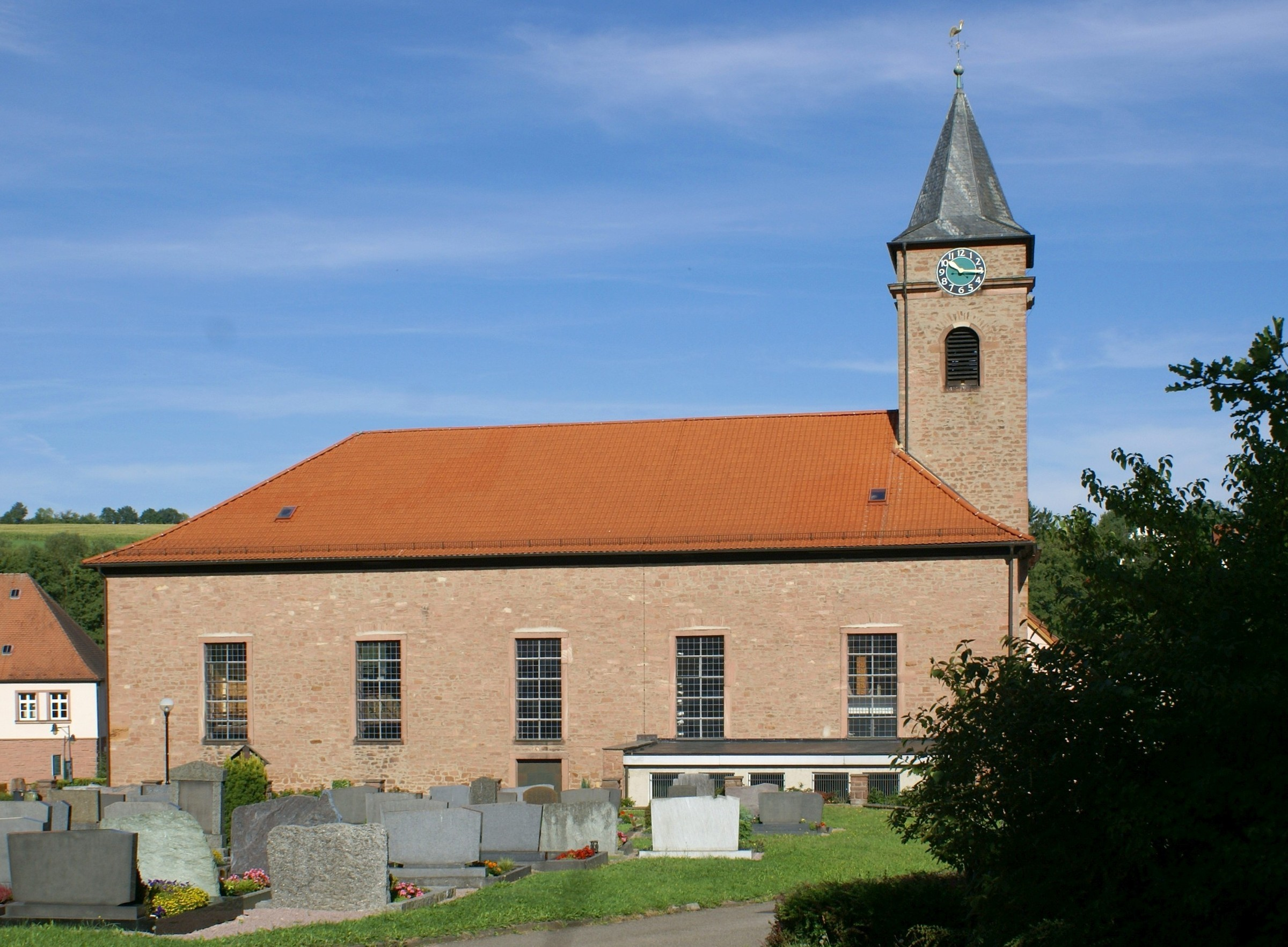
- Church of Saint Joseph

- Coat of arms

- Location of Kleinkahl within Aschaffenburg district
- Interactive map of Kleinkahl
- Location within Germany Location within Bavaria
- Coordinates: 50°7′N 9°16′E
- Country: Germany
- State: Bavaria
- Admin. region: Unterfranken
- District: Aschaffenburg
- Municipal assoc.: Schöllkrippen
- Subdivisions: 5 Ortsteile

Government
  - Mayor (2020–26): Angelika Krebs

Area
  - Total: 14.21 km^{2} (5.49 sq mi)
- Elevation: 242 m (794 ft)

Population (2025-12-31)
  - Total: 1,807
  - Density: 127.2/km^{2} (329.4/sq mi)
- Time zone: UTC+01:00 (CET)
  - Summer (DST): UTC+02:00 (CEST)
- Postal codes: 63828
- Dialling codes: 06024
- Vehicle registration: AB
- Website: www.gemeinde-kleinkahl.de

Kleinkahl is a municipality in the Aschaffenburg district in the Regierungsbezirk of Lower Franconia (Unterfranken) in Bavaria, Germany, and a member of the Verwaltungsgemeinschaft (municipal association) of Schöllkrippen. Kleinkahl has around 1,800 inhabitants.

== Geography ==
=== Location ===
Gemeindeteile

Kleinkahl lies in the region known as "Bavarian Lower Main" (Bayerischer Untermain) in the Mittelgebirge Spessart. The municipal territory is located at the northern border of the district of Aschaffenburg and at the border between Bavaria and Hesse. It lies in the Kahlgrund, the valley of the river Kahl, a tributary of the Main. At Kleinkahl, the Kleine Kahl flows into the Kahl.

=== Subdivision ===
Kleinkahl has eight Ortsteile: Edelbach, Kahlmühle, Großkahl, Glashütte, Wesemichhof, Großlaudenbach, Kleinkahl and Kleinlaudenbach. The municipality has the following five Gemarkungen (traditional rural cadastral areas): Edelbach, Großkahl, Großlaudenbach, Kleinkahl, Kleinlaudenbach.

=== Neighbouring municipalities ===
Kleinkahl borders on (clockwise from the north): Biebergemünd (Hesse), the unincorporated areas Wiesener Forst and Schöllkrippener Forst, Schöllkrippen and Westerngrund.

== History ==
Part of the current municipal area lay within the Archbishopric of Mainz and in 1803, it was secularized. The rest lay within Krombach over which the Counts of Schönborn held sway and passed with mediatization in 1806 to the Principality of Aschaffenburg, with which it passed in 1814 to the Kingdom of Bavaria. In the course of administrative reform in Bavaria, the current municipality came into being with the Gemeindeedikt (“Municipal Edict”) of 1818.

On 1 July 1972, the municipalities Kleinkahl, Großlaudenbach and Kleinlaudenbach were merged to form the new municipality Kleinkahl. On 1 January 1976, Edelbach became a part of Kleinkahl.

== Demographics ==
Within the municipal area, there were 1,608 inhabitants in 1970, 1,582 in 1987 and 1,842 in 2000.

== Governance ==
=== Municipal council ===
The council is made up of 13 council members, counting the part-time mayor.

Year	CSU/Wählergemeinschaft	Total
2002	13	13 seats

(as at municipal election held on 3 March 2008)

=== Mayor ===
The mayor is Angelika Krebs (Wählergemeinschaft).

=== Coat of arms ===
The municipality's arms might be described thus: A pallet wavy per pallet wavy argent and azure, dexter gules a glass of the last, sinister a castle with three towers embattled gules.

The parted wavy pallet refers to the municipality's geographical location of the river Kahl, which runs through the municipality. Since municipal reform in 1970 the municipality has been made up of five Gemeindeteile, Kleinkahl and Kleinlaudenbach on the Kahl's left bank, and Großkahl and Großlaudenbach on the Kahl's right bank. Edelbach lies somewhat farther away. The river, which rises some two or three kilometres upstream, was in the Middle Ages a political boundary. The glass on the dexter (armsbearer's right, viewer's left) side is a so-called Spechter and refers to the local glass production since the Middle Ages. The tinctures argent and gules (silver and red) are those of Electoral Mainz, to which the area belonged until 1803. The sinister (armsbearer's left, viewer's right) side shows the arms borne by the family Ulner of Dieburg, an aristocratic family known to have been in the municipal area from the 15th to the 17th century. The Ulner coat of arms was incorporated into the municipality's arms not only for this family's history here, but rather also to recall the Counts of Rieneck and Schönberg.

The arms have been borne since 18 October 1985.

== Economy ==
Municipal tax revenue in 1999 amounted to €674,000 (converted), of which €8,000 (net) was business taxes.

According to official statistics, there were 160 workers on the social welfare contribution rolls working in producing businesses, and in trade and transport 0. In other areas, 27 workers on the social welfare contribution rolls are employed, and 667 such workers work from home. There are two processing businesses. Three businesses are in construction, and furthermore, in 1999, there were 28 agricultural operations with a working area of 563 ha, of which 162 ha was cropland and 399 ha was meadowland.

== Education ==
As of 1999, Kleinkahl had a kindergarten with 75 places.
