= Mömbris =

- Municipality
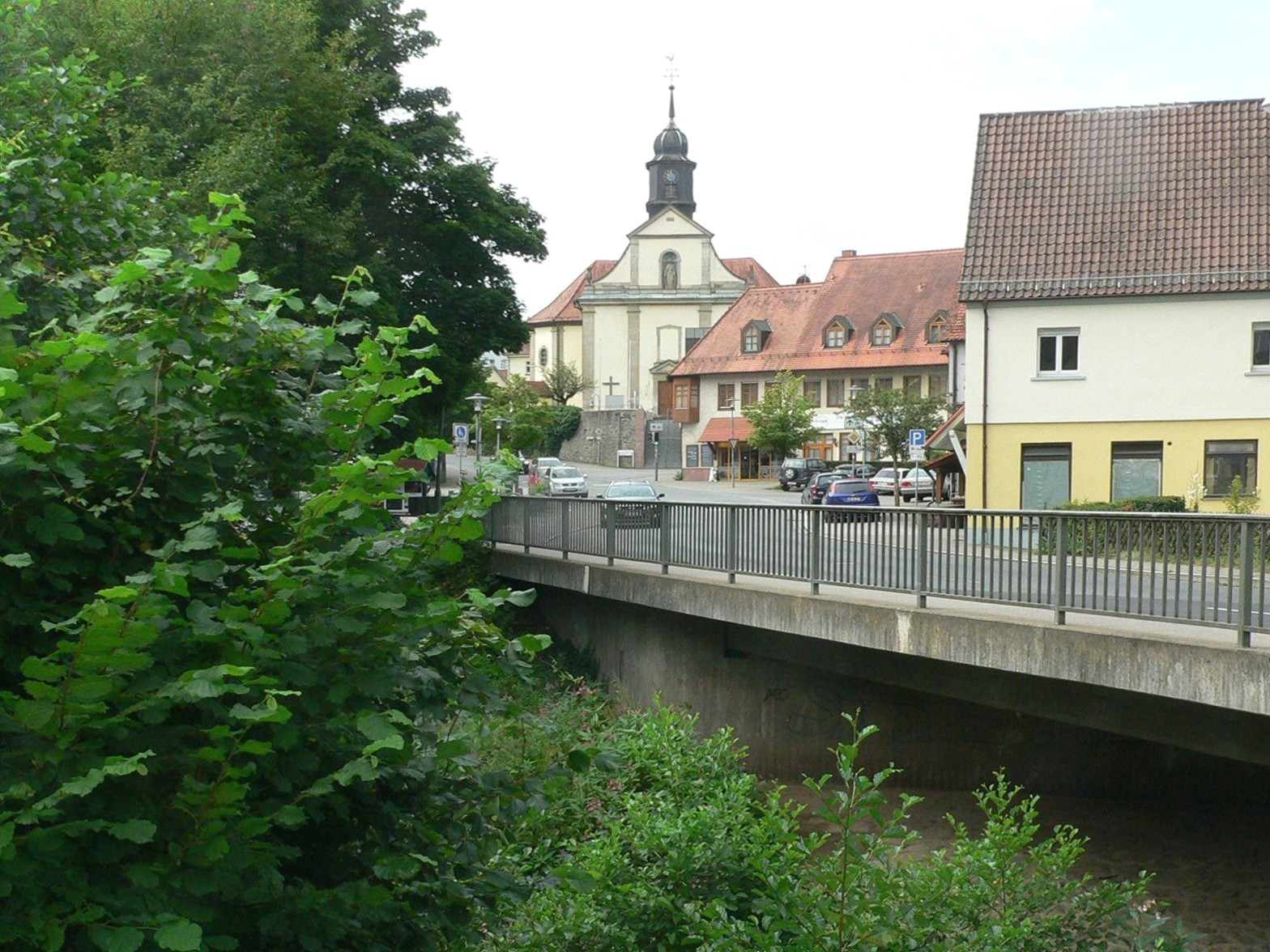
- Bridge over the Kahl at Mömbris with Market Square and Saint Cyriacus Church

- Coat of arms

- Location of Mömbris within Aschaffenburg district
- Interactive map of Mömbris
- Location within Germany Location within Bavaria
- Coordinates: 50°4′N 9°10′E
- Country: Germany
- State: Bavaria
- Admin. region: Unterfranken
- District: Aschaffenburg

Government
  - Mayor (2020–26): Felix Wissel (Ind.)

Area
  - Total: 35.92 km^{2} (13.87 sq mi)
- Elevation: 180 m (590 ft)

Population (2025-12-31)
  - Total: 11,247
  - Density: 313.1/km^{2} (811.0/sq mi)
- Time zone: UTC+01:00 (CET)
  - Summer (DST): UTC+02:00 (CEST)
- Postal codes: 63776
- Dialling codes: 06029
- Vehicle registration: AB, ALZ
- Website: www.moembris.de

Mömbris is a municipality – since 31 January 1964 a market municipality – in the Aschaffenburg district in the Regierungsbezirk of Lower Franconia (Unterfranken) in Bavaria, Germany. With over 11,000 inhabitants, Mömbris is the district's fifth largest municipality.

== Geography ==
=== Location ===
Mömbris lies in the Bavarian Lower Main (Bayerischer Untermain) in the Kahlgrund halfway between Schöllkrippen and Alzenau, which are linked by Staatsstraße (State Road) 2305, at the foot of the Vorspessart (range) with its highest elevation, the Hahnenkamm at 437 m above sea level. The river Kahl flows through Mömbris.

Mömbris comprises all together 18 centres in an area of 35.92 km^{2}. The greater share (32.81 km^{2}) is woods, meadows and cropland. The municipality lies between 165 and 337 m above sea level.

=== Gemeindeteile ===
Gemeindeteile

Mömbris's Ortsteile are as follows:

- Angelsberg
- Brücken
- Daxberg
- Dörnsteinbach
- Gunzenbach
- Heimbach
- Hemsbach
- Hohl
- Königshofen a.d.Kahl
- Mensengesäß
- Molkenberg
- Mömbris
- Niedersteinbach
- Rappach
- Reichenbach
- Rothengrund
- Schimborn
- Strötzbach

=== Amalgamations ===
- As of 1818, Brücken, Strötzbach, Rappach, Heimbach, Gunzenbach, Rothengrund, Angelsberg and Molkenberg were part of Mömbris.
- The first municipalities merged into the market municipality of Mömbris, with effect from 1 January 1972, were Daxberg, Hemsbach and Mensengesäß.
- On 1 July 1972, the municipality of Niedersteinbach followed.
- On 1 January 1974, Dörnsteinbach and Hohl were amalgamated.
- The municipality of Reichenbach merged on 1 January 1976.
- Schimborn, which had already been merged with Königshofen a.d.Kahl in 1971 to form the municipality of Schimborn, was amalgamated along with its outlying centre into Mömbris on 1 May 1978.

=== Bavaria-Hesse boundary ===
Hesse pokes a tongue of its territory into the market municipality. In 2007, a territorial exchange involving roughly 10 hectares of land was undertaken between Hesse and Bavaria, whereby the latter shrank by 1.77 hectares.

Until this time, the state boundary ran right through the FV Viktoria 1930 e. V. Brücken (football club) clubhouse. Elsewhere, the boundary also cut through a short stretch of Staatsstraße 2305 – a road administered by Bavaria – in the outlying centre of Niedersteinbach, meaning that this Bavarian-owned road ran for a short distance through Hesse; this stretch of road came to be known as the Hessenkurve.

== History ==
The Mömbris tithe court belonged until 1748, along with those of Alzenau and Hörstein and the free court to the Wilmundsheim vor der Hart (Alzenau) Markgenossenschaft (a kind of collective arrangement in which several villages jointly owned land resources). Free Märker (Markgenossenschaft dwellers) gathered every year in Alzenau to choose a Landrichter (judge) and foresters and to deal with important decisions.

The tithe courts originally had Imperial immediacy. Chairmanship was held by a tithe count chosen to serve for one year. Each village supplied, commensurately with each one's number of freemen, Schöffen (roughly “lay jurists”) whose job it was to mete out justice. In 1500, the tithe courts lost their Imperial immediacy along with its attendant privileges. Ecclesiastical jurisdiction was thereafter exercised by the Archbishopric of Mainz.

Mömbris became under the Reichsdeputationshauptschluss in 1803 part of the newly formed Principality of Aschaffenburg, ruled by Prince primate Karl Theodor von Dalberg, with which it passed in 1814 (by this time it had become a department of the Grand Duchy of Frankfurt) to Bavaria.

== Government ==
=== Mayors ===
- Georg Grünewald (1876–1910)
- August Grünewald (1911–1938)
- Gottfried van Treek (1939–1945)
- Anton Volk (1945)
- Leopold Wissel (1945–1951)
- Anton Reising (CSU) (1951–1986)
- Michael Schneemeier (SPD) (1986–1998)
- Reinhold Glaser (CSU) (1998–2008)
- Felix Wissel (SPD/independent) (2008–)

=== Municipal council ===
The council is made up of 25 council members, counting the full-time mayor.

	CSU	SPD	Wählergemeinschaft	Unabhängige Bürger	Total
2008	9	8	3	4	24 seats

(as at municipal election held on 2 March 2008)

=== Town twinning ===
- Pré-Bocage with its communes of Les Monts d'Aunay, Caumont-sur-Aure and Villers-Bocage, Calvados, France since 1989.

=== Coat of arms ===
The municipality's arms might be described thus: Gules a sword argent palewise the hilt and pommel Or, dexter a wheel of the second spoked of six, sinister a crown proper with four leaves.

Mömbris was until 1500 a kingly estate, as witnessed by the crown on the sinister (armsbearer's left, viewer's right) side. The place was also the seat of a free court, symbolized by the sword. In 1487, Electoral Mainz managed to acquire a share of sovereignty over the area, and in 1738, this became total. The six-spoked wheel (Wheel of Mainz) on the dexter (armsbearer's right, viewer's left) side recalls this.

The arms were designed and introduced in 1961. In 1963, Mömbris was granted market rights.

== Economy ==
The high population figure belies Mömbris's scattered, agricultural character, for since the sweeping municipal reform in the late 1970s, Mömbris has been made up of 18 Gemeindeteile. These are mainly small centres with 200 to 1,000 inhabitants, the exceptions being Schimborn (1,800) and the namesake centre Mömbris (2,000), giving the market municipality of Mömbris a population of some 12,000 in 2004. Over the last few years, Mömbris has had to deal with a fall in population and economic problems (loss of buying power in the neighbouring Kahlgrund towns of Schöllkrippen and Alzenau). Mömbris has repeatedly been Bavaria's most indebted municipality in proportion to its population.

According to official statistics, there were 1,038 workers on the social welfare contribution rolls working in agriculture, forestry and producing businesses in 1998. In trade and transport this was 410. In other areas, 398 workers on the social welfare contribution rolls were employed, and 4,435 such workers worked from home. There were 3 processing businesses. Twenty-nine businesses were in construction, and furthermore, in 1999, there were 117 agricultural operations with a working area of 1 240 ha, of which 592 ha was cropland and 613 ha was meadowland.

== Sports ==
Mömbris is home to the Bundesliga wrestling team RWG Mömbris-Königshofen.

== Education ==
In 1999, the following institutions were to be found in Mömbris:

- kindergartens: 495 kindergarten places with 471 children
- primary schools: 5 with 46 teachers and 985 pupils

== Notable people ==
=== Honorary citizens ===
- since 2004 Auxiliary Bishop Helmut Bauer (of the Archdiocese of Würzburg)

=== Sons and daughters of the town ===
- Father Ivo Zeiger (born 29 July 1898 in Mömbris; died 24 December 1952 in Munich), Professor of Church Law, in 1939 Rector of the Germanicum in Rome and in 1945 Papal diplomat in Kronberg im Taunus. In his memory, the municipality named the primary school built in 1959 Ivo-Zeiger-Schule and the ecclesiastical municipality centre Ivo-Zeiger-Haus.
- Peter Behl (born 12 February 1966 in Mömbris), wrestler

=== Others linked to the municipality ===
- Heinrich Degen (born 2 October 1902 in Burgbrohl; died 9 March 1970 in Mömbris), district councillor for the former Alzenau district
- Felix Wissel (born 1 November 1978 in Alzenau-Wasserlos) is a German Bundesliga wrestler and Chief Mayor of Mömbris.
