= Unterer Hösbach =

River in Germany

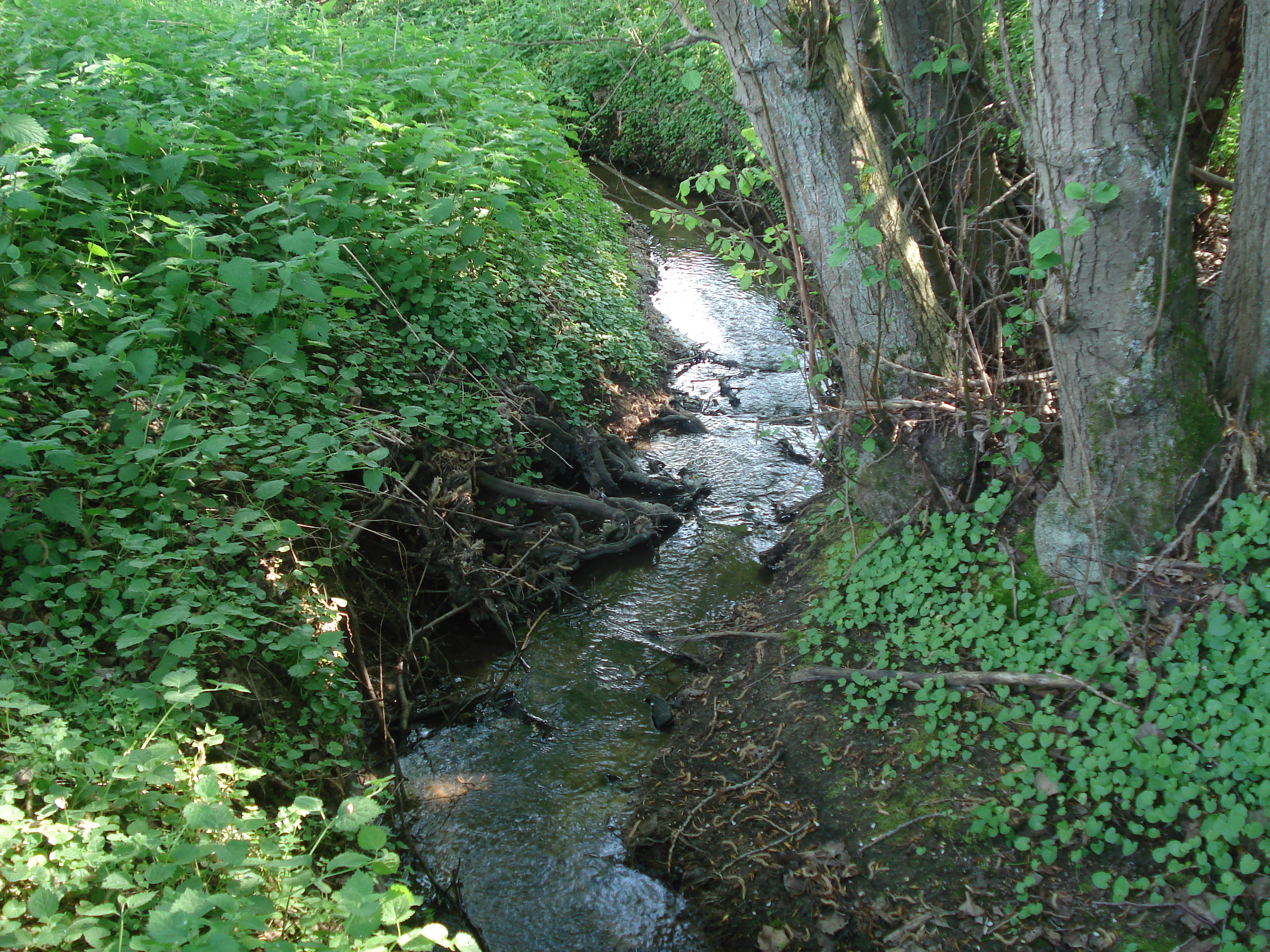
- The Untere Hösbach north of Unterafferbach

Location
- Country: Germany
- State: Bavaria

Physical characteristics
- Mouth
  - location: Hösbach
  - coordinates: 50.0134°N 9.2044°E

Basin features
- Progression: Hösbach→ Aschaff→ Main→ Rhine→ North Sea

Unterer Hösbach is a small river of Bavaria, Germany. It flows into the Hösbach near the village Hösbach.

== See also ==
- List of rivers of Bavaria
