= Afferbach =

River in Germany

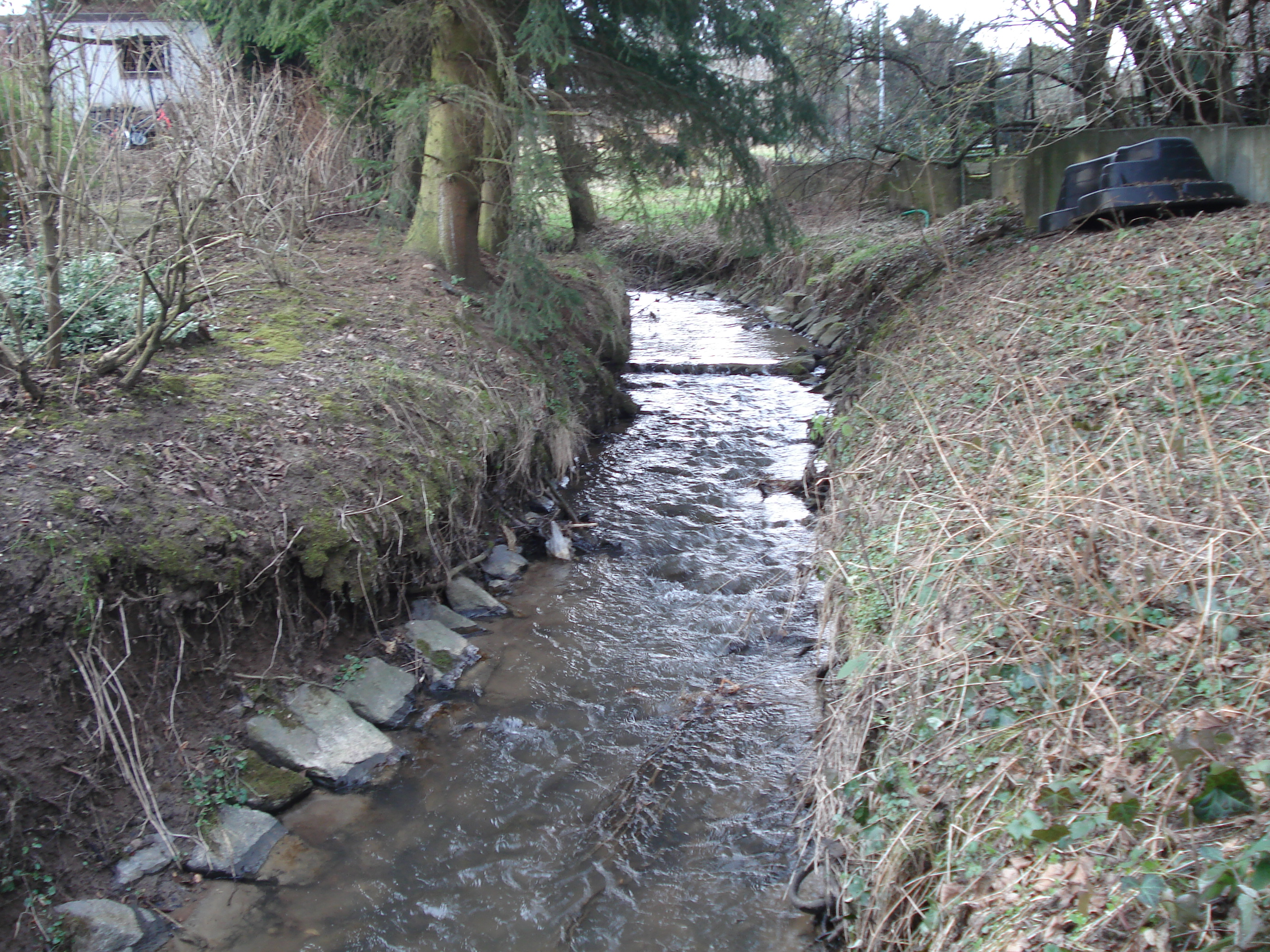
- The Afferbach in Hösbach

- Mouth

Location
- Country: Germany
- Location: Bavaria

Physical characteristics
- Mouth
  - location: Hösbach
  - coordinates: 50.0108°N 9.2042°E

Basin features
- Progression: Hösbach→ Aschaff→ Main→ Rhine→ North Sea

The Afferbach is a river of Bavaria, Germany. It flows into the Hösbach in Hösbach.

== Etymology ==
The name is derived from the Middle High German affelder meaning apple tree stream .

== See also ==
- List of rivers of Bavaria
