= Gräfenberg =

Gräfenberg may refer to:

- Gräfenberg, Bavaria, a town in Germany
- Lázně Jeseník (German: Gräfenberg Spa), a spa resort in the Czech Republic
- Gräfenberg (Spessart) (364 m), a hill in the Spessart range in Bavaria, Germany
- Gräfenberg Castle (Aschaffenburg), district of Aschaffenburg
- Gräfenberg Castle (Forchheim), district of Forchheim
- Ernst Gräfenberg, German gynaecologist
  - Gräfenberg spot or G-spot, area of female anatomy discovered by Ernst Gräfenberg

== See also ==
- Grafenberg (disambiguation) (non-umlaut form)
- Grevenberg
