= Klingenbach (Goldbach) =

River in Germany

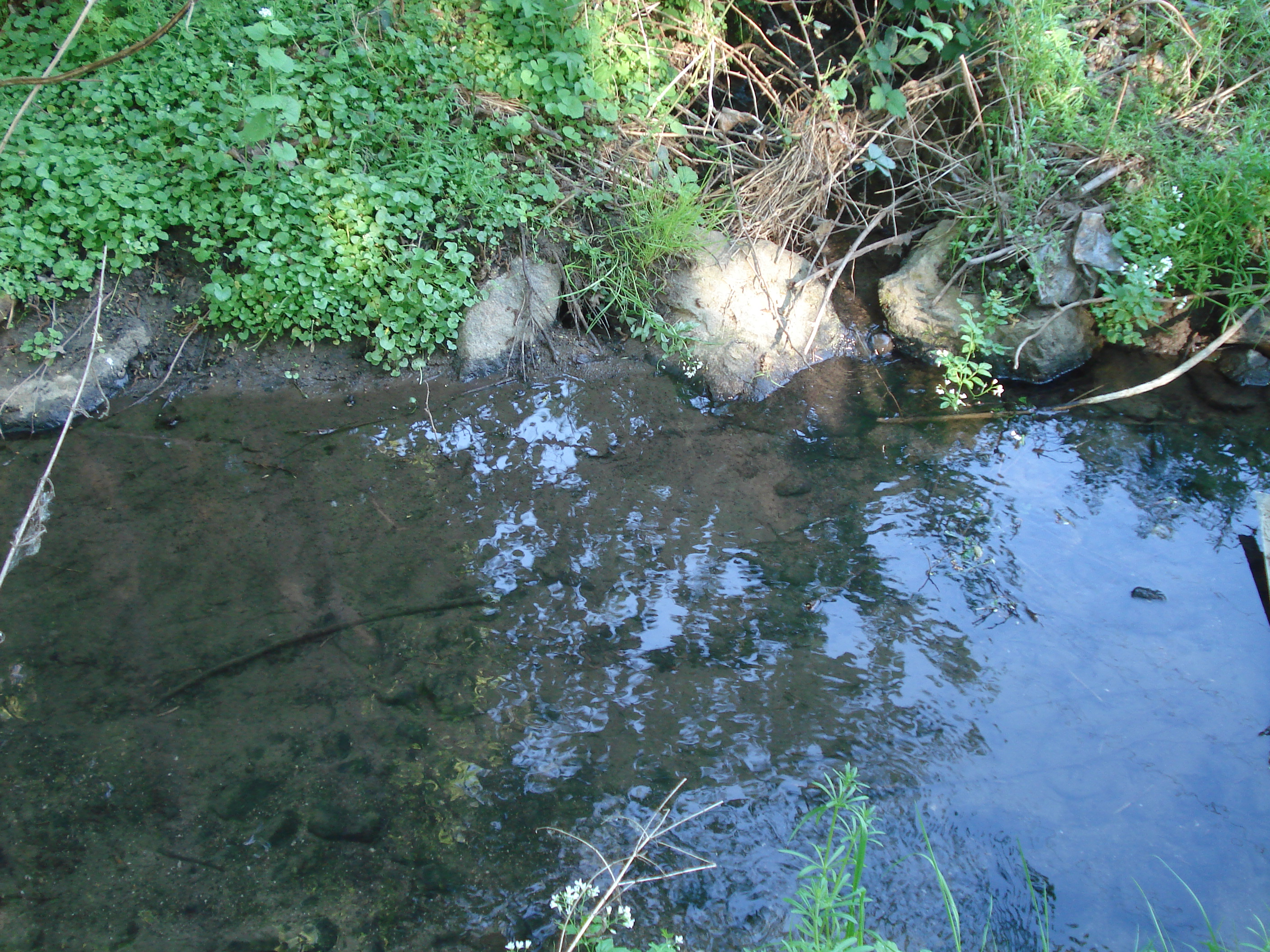
- The Klingenbach (from the background) flowing into the Goldbach (foreground)

Location
- Country: Germany
- States: Bavaria

Physical characteristics
- Mouth
  - location: Goldbach
  - coordinates: 49.9920°N 9.1678°E

Basin features
- Progression: Goldbach→ Aschaff→ Main→ Rhine→ North Sea

Klingenbach (German pronunciation: [ˈklɪŋənbax]) is a river of Bavaria, Germany. It is a right tributary to the Flutgraben, the man-made lower course of the Goldbach, in Aschaffenburg.

== See also ==
- List of rivers of Bavaria
