= Michelbach (Bessenbach) =

River in Germany

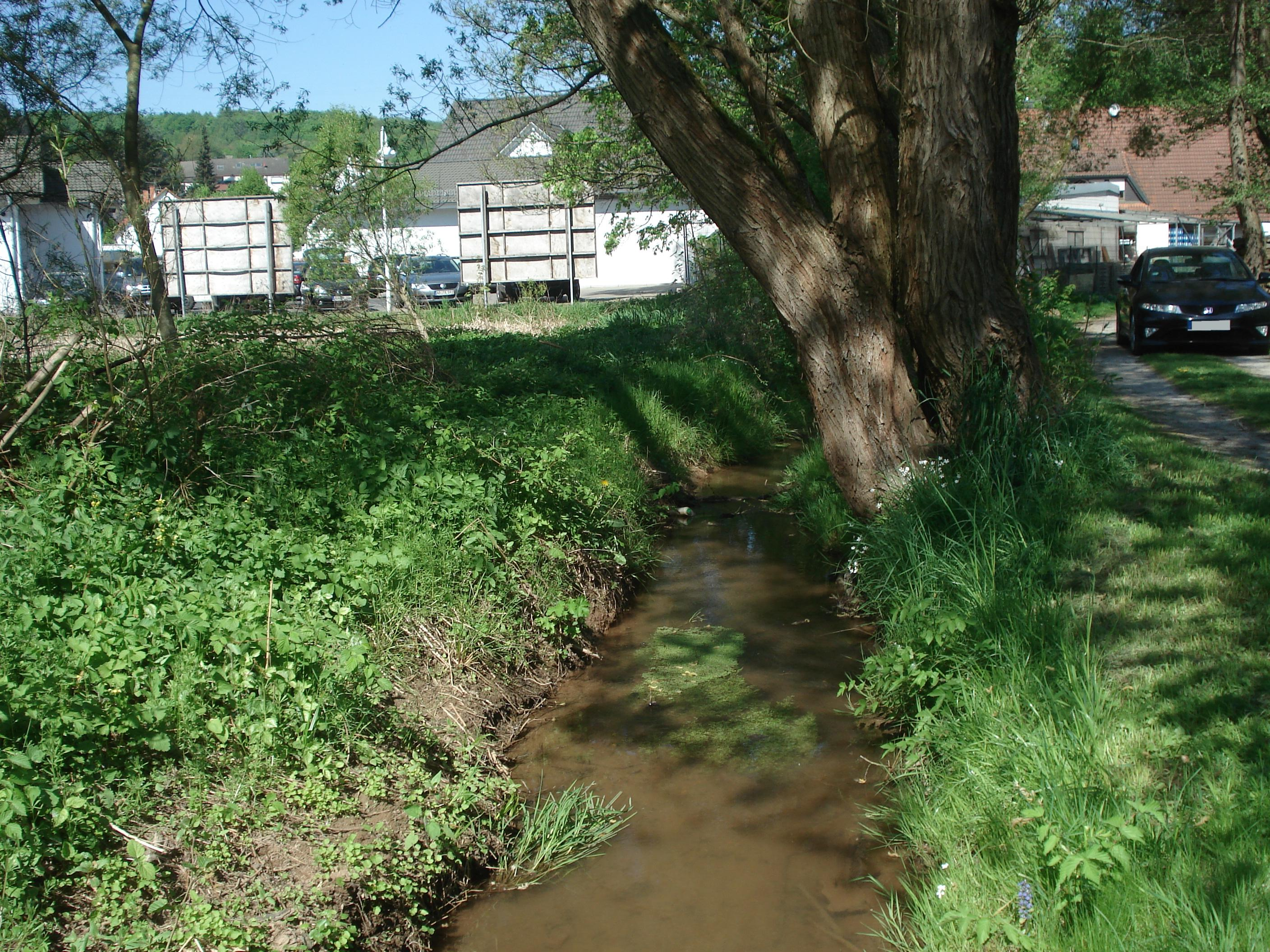
- The Michelbach in Keilberg (a part of the municipality Bessenbach)

Location
- Country: Germany
- States: Bavaria

Physical characteristics
- Mouth
  - location: Bessenbach
  - coordinates: 49.9741°N 9.2535°E

Basin features
- Progression: Bessenbach→ Aschaff→ Main→ Rhine→ North Sea

Michelbach is a river of Bavaria, Germany. It is a right tributary of the Bessenbach near Keilberg.

== Geography ==
The Michelbach rises southeast of Wald-Michelbach, a small settlement in the municipality Hesse. The Michelbach flows through Wald-Michelbach in the northwest where the Schäfersbach joins it from the right. In Keilberg (a part of the municipality Bessenbach), it passes under the Staatsstraße 2307 and flows into the Bessenbach, another river in the area.

== See also ==
- List of rivers of Bavaria
