= Kühruhgraben =

River in Germany

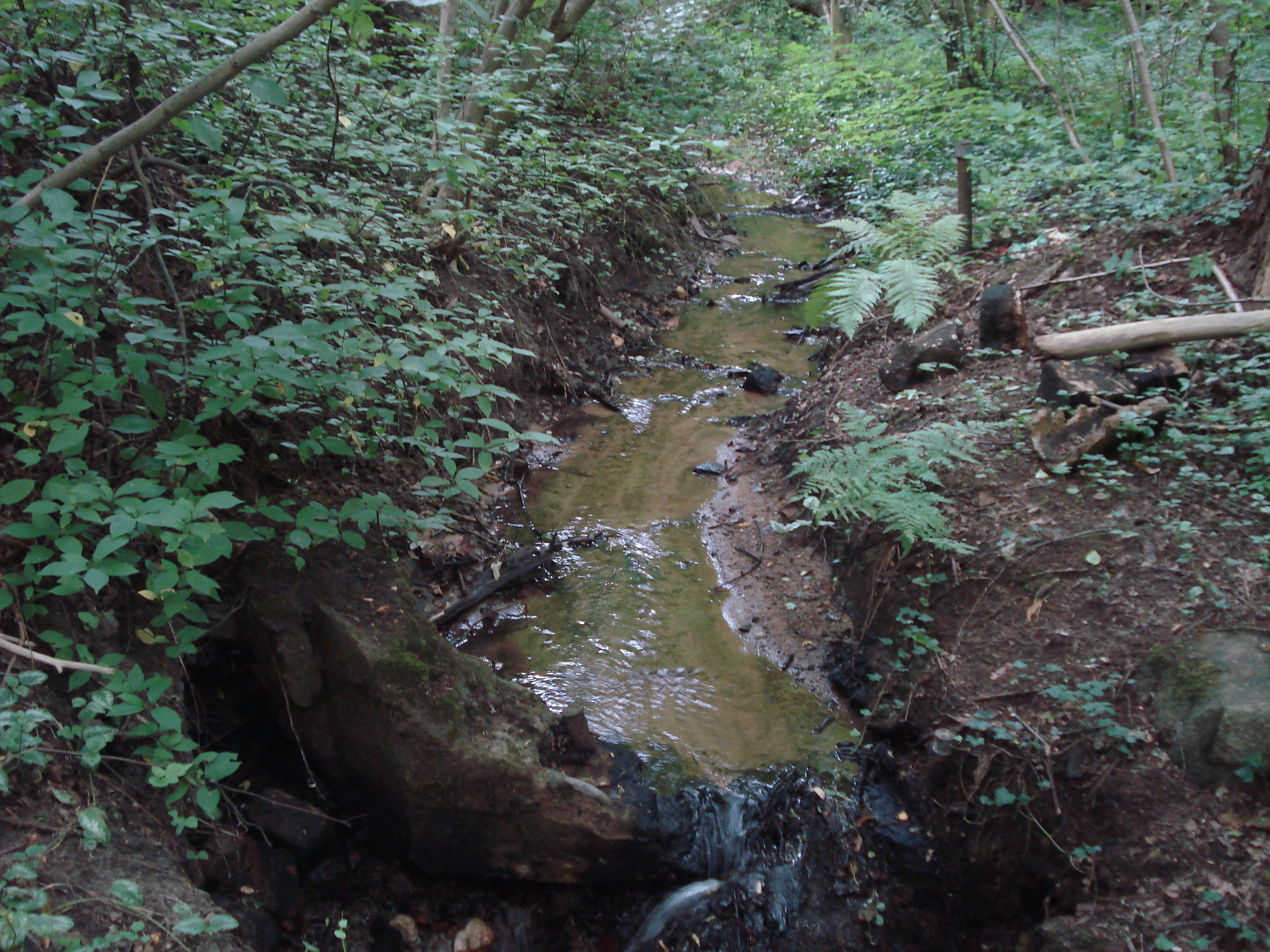
- The Kühruhgraben in Aschaffenburg

Location
- Country: Germany
- States: Bavaria

Physical characteristics
- Mouth
  - location: Röderbach
  - coordinates: 49.9774°N 9.1580°E

Basin features
- Progression: Röderbach→ Aschaff→ Main→ Rhine→ North Sea

Kühruhgraben is a small river of Bavaria, Germany. It flows into the Röderbach in Aschaffenburg. It also flows into the local Schöntal Park, a tranquil rest area, in Aschaffenburg, and into the Kirchenruine Heilig Grab, a historical landmark. The River underwent a renaturation effort in 2021, greening up the local areas around the riverbank.

== See also ==
- List of rivers of Bavaria
