= Pfaffenberg =

Pfaffenberg may refer to:

- Pfaffenberg (Hohenstein-Ernstthal), a mountain in Germany
- Pfaffenberg (Spessart), a hill in Germany
- Pfaffenberg (Wendelsheim), a mountain in Germany
