= Autenbach =

River in Bavaria, Germany

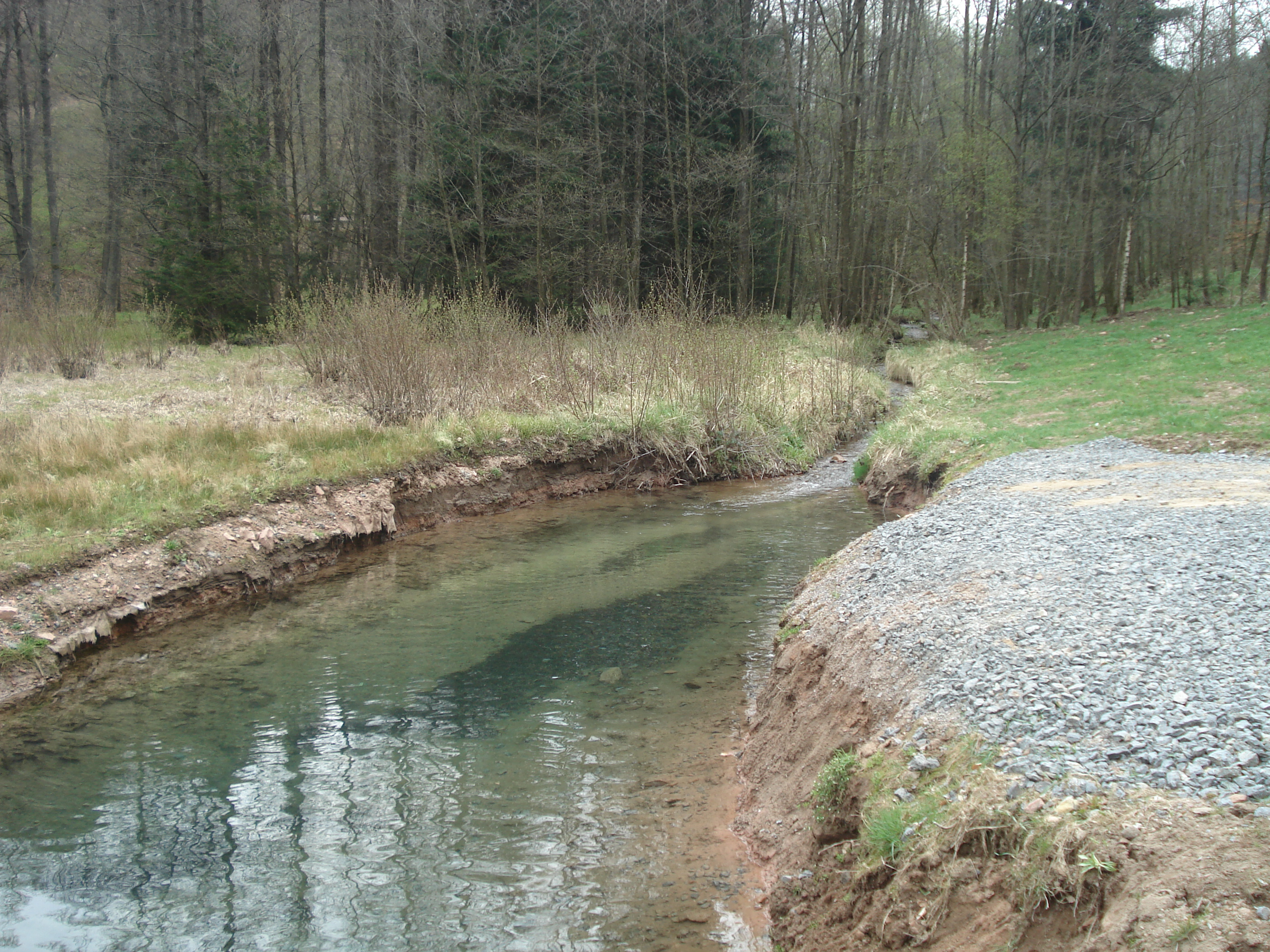
- The Autenbach before Waldaschaff

- Location of mouth in Bavaria

Location
- Country: Germany
- State: Bavaria

Physical characteristics
- Mouth
  - location: Aschaff
  - coordinates: 49.9725°N 9.3006°E

Basin features
- Progression: Aschaff→ Main→ Rhine→ North Sea

Autenbach is a small river in Bavaria, Germany. It flows into the Aschaff in Waldaschaff. The river is known for timber rafting during the start of the 18th century. The river still contains a dam that was used for the timber rafting. The dam was renovated in 2011.

== See also ==
- List of rivers of Bavaria
