= Güntersbach =

River in Germany

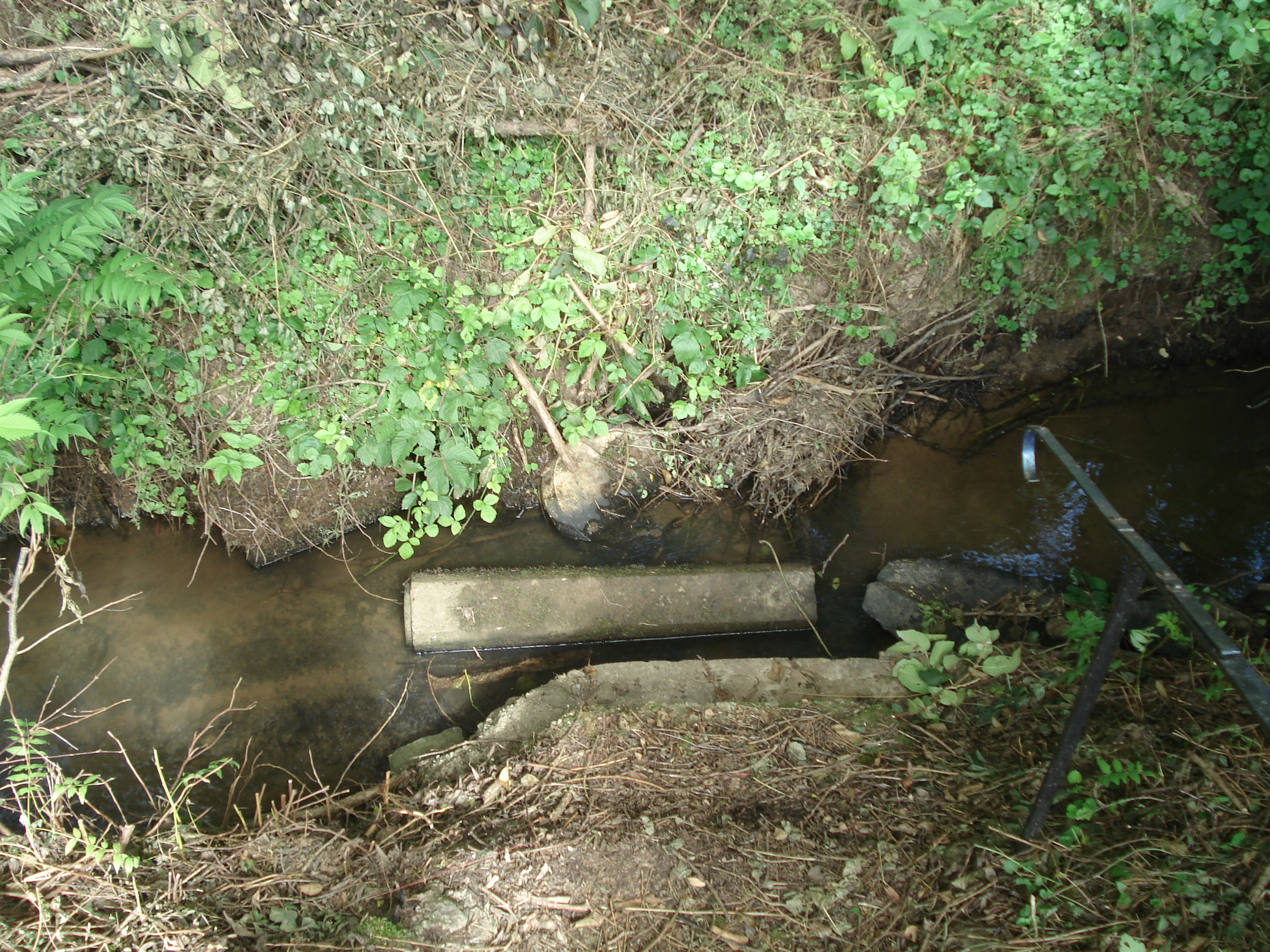
- The Güntersbach at Hösbach

Location
- Country: Germany
- States: Bavaria

Physical characteristics
- Mouth
  - location: Aschaff
  - coordinates: 50.0045°N 9.2219°E

Basin features
- Progression: Aschaff→ Main→ Rhine→ North Sea

Güntersbach (German pronunciation: [ˈɡʏntɐsbax]) is a small river of Bavaria, Germany. It flows into the Aschaff near Hösbach.

== Geography ==
The Güntersbach rises on the Rottenberg hill at the foot of the Gräfenberg (364 m). It flows southward, crossing the road 2307 and the B 26, and ends at the Hösbach junction on the A 3 in Aschaff.

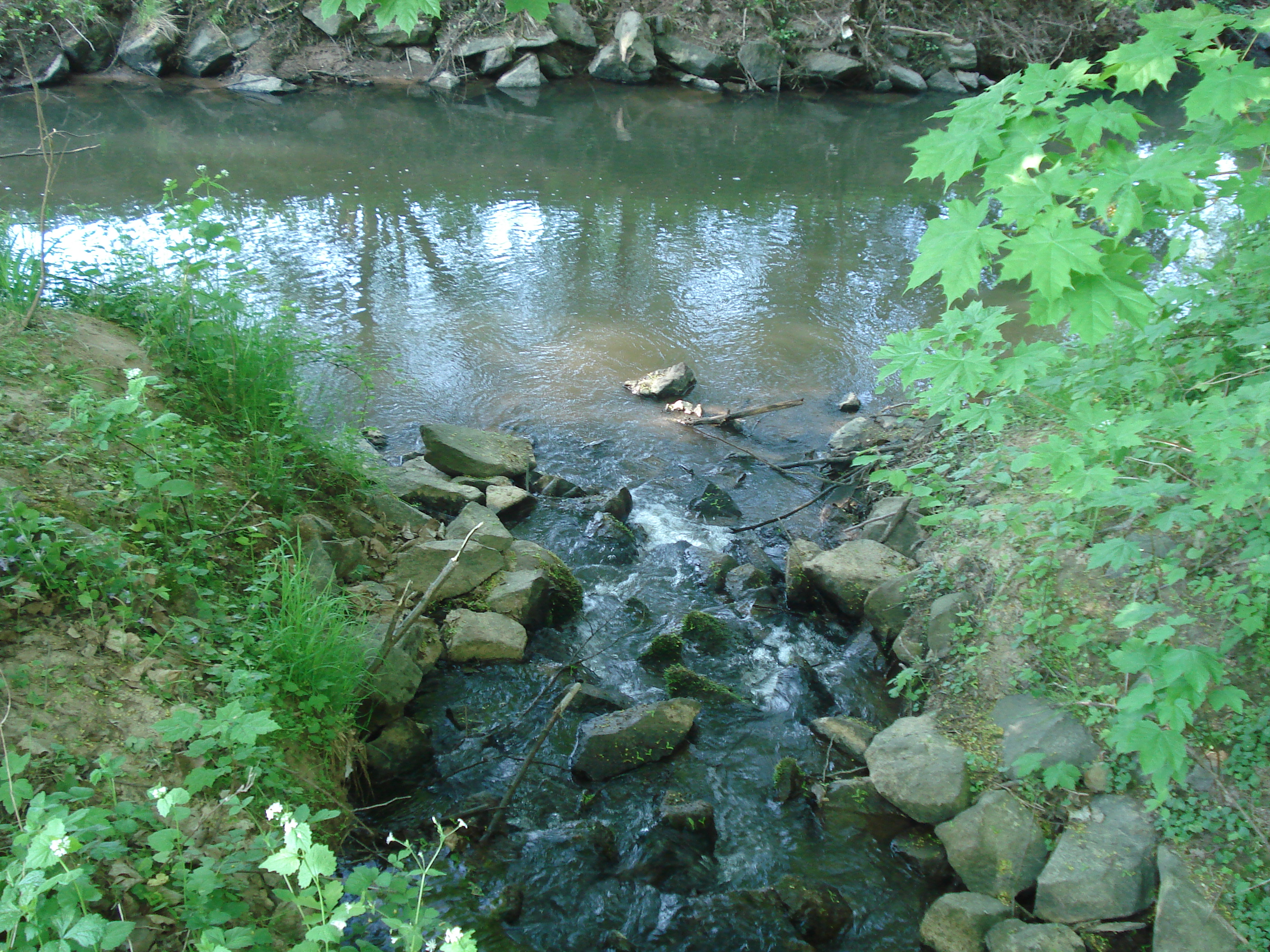
Mouth of the Güntersbach

== See also ==
- List of rivers of Bavaria
