= Gräfenberg Castle (Aschaffenburg) =

- Burg Landesehre
- Rottenberg, Hösbach
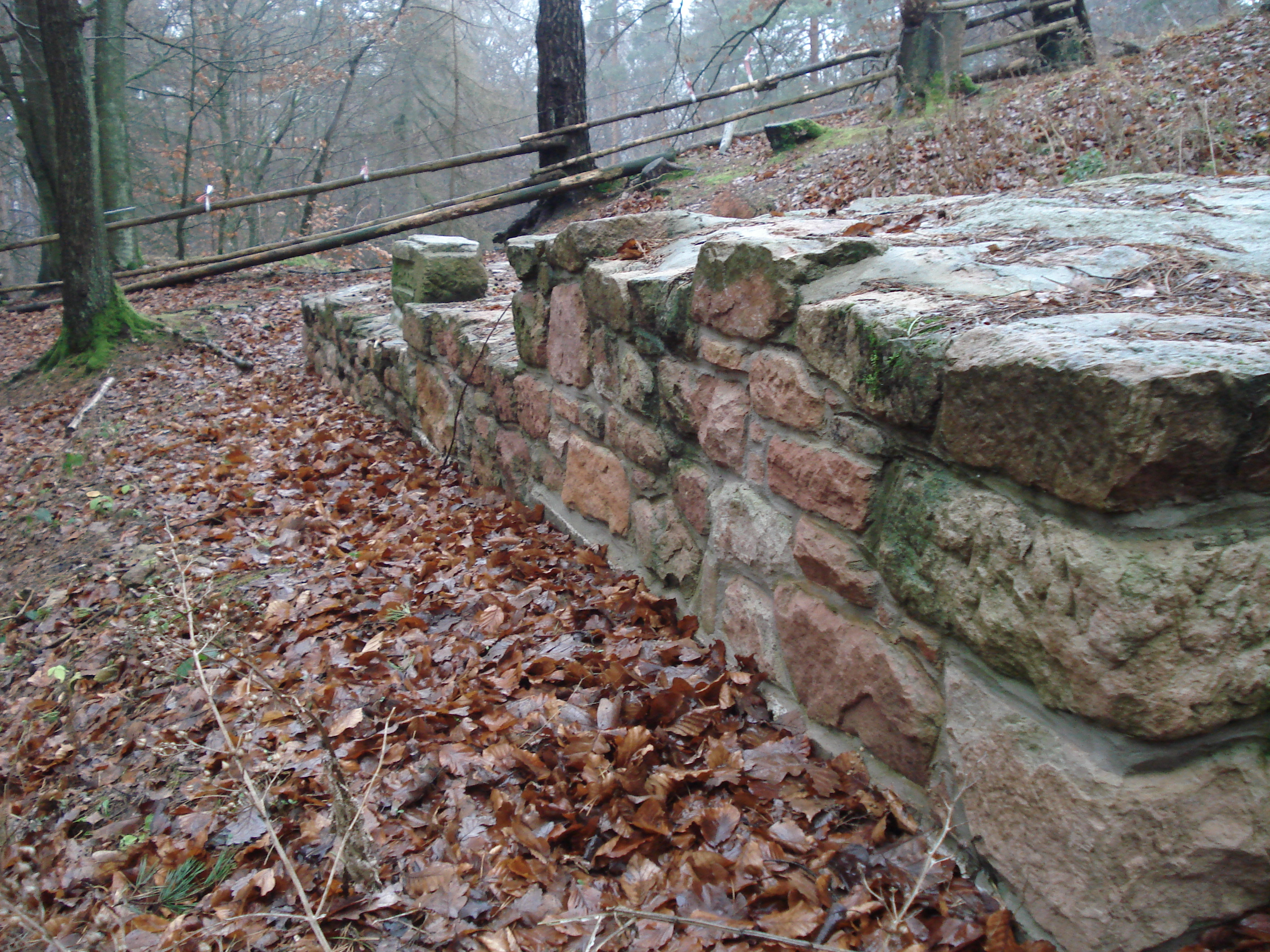
- Wall remains

Site information
- Type: hill castle, summit location
- Code: DE-BY
- Condition: burgstall, some wall remains

Location
- Coordinates: 50°01′56″N 9°13′51″E
- Height: 360 m above sea level (NN)

Site history
- Built: mid-13th century

Gräfenberg Castle (German: Burgstall Gräfenberg), also called Landesehre Castle (Burg Landesehre), is a levelled hilltop castle near 360 m above sea level (NN) on the hill of Gräfenberg. It is located near Rottenberg in the market municipality of Hösbach in the district of Aschaffenburg in the south German state of Bavaria.

== History ==
The castle was probably built in the mid-13th century on and next to a fort of the La Tène period, probably later than the castle on nearby Klosterberg. By 1261 the castle had been destroyed during a conflict between the Rieneck counts and Electoral Mainz. In the 18th century the castle was used as a quarry and demolished apart from a few wall remains.

== Description ==
The castle had a sturdy enceinte, which enclosed the entire site and guaranteed protection for its occupants. The roughly 2-metre-thick and probably over ten-metre-high shield wall with its wooden wall walk and tiled roof was integrated into the early mediaeval enceinte. The buildings in the castle courtyard were made of stone and wood. From the then treeless summit, the Aschaff valley could be overlooked.

In 1904, the Aschaffenburg chemist, Deinlein, carried out the first excavations on the Gräfenberg. Today there are the wall foundations of a rectangular building, a five-metre-long and 1.8-metre-side longitudinal wall, a four-metre-long and 0.4-metre-wide transverse wall which abuts on another wall that has yet to be uncovered. Also recognisable are elements of a vaulted ceiling and a circular wall that could be a cistern or a dungeon.

== Literature ==
- Björn-Uwe Abels: Die vor- und frühgeschichtlichen Geländedenkmäler Unterfrankens. (Materialhefte zur bayerischen Vorgeschichte, Series B, Vol. 6). Verlag Michael Lassleben, Kallmünz, 1979, ISBN 3-7847-5306-X, p. 67.
- Karl Bosl (ed.): Handbuch der historischen Stätten, 7th volume, Bayern, 3rd edition, Alfred Kröner Verlag, Stuttgart, 1981, ISBN 3-520-27703-4.
