= Schmerlenbach =

Schmerlenbach may refer to:

- Schmerlenbach (Nonnenbach), a river of Bavaria, Germany
- Schmerlenbach (Teufelsbach), a river of Saxony-Anhalt, Germany
