= Mainaschaff =

- Municipality
- Coat of arms

- Location of Mainaschaff within Aschaffenburg district
- Interactive map of Mainaschaff
- Location within Germany Location within Bavaria
- Coordinates: 49°59′N 9°5′E
- Country: Germany
- State: Bavaria
- Admin. region: Unterfranken
- District: Aschaffenburg

Government
  - Mayor (2020–26): Moritz Sammer

Area
  - Total: 7.31 km^{2} (2.82 sq mi)
- Elevation: 114 m (374 ft)

Population (2025-12-31)
  - Total: 8,627
  - Density: 1,180/km^{2} (3,060/sq mi)
- Time zone: UTC+01:00 (CET)
  - Summer (DST): UTC+02:00 (CEST)
- Postal codes: 63814
- Dialling codes: 06021
- Vehicle registration: AB, ALZ
- Website: www.mainaschaff.de

Mainaschaff is a municipality in the Aschaffenburg district in the Regierungsbezirk of Lower Franconia (Unterfranken) in Bavaria, Germany. It has a population of around 9,000 (2020).

== Geography ==
=== Location ===
Gemeindeteile

The municipality lies near the boundary with Hesse, to the west just outside Aschaffenburg. It is located on the Main’s right bank, and on the small river Aschaff, which empties here into the Main. This confluence gave the municipality its name.

== History ==
In 1184, Mainaschaff had its first documentary mention as a holding in Pope Lucius III’s privilege for the Kollegiatsstift at Aschaffenburg. In the early 12th century, the small village, which was made up mainly of farms, belonged to the Stift of St. Peter and Alexander in Aschaffenburg. The inhabitants, who made their living mostly by growing fruit and fishing, had to pay ongoing tribute to the Stift, and also perform compulsory labour for it.

Only in 1872 did Mainaschaff become a self-administering municipality.

== Governance ==
=== Municipal council ===
The council is made up of 20 council members, not counting the mayor.

	SPD	CSU	FWG	AfD	Total
2020	8	7	4	1	20 seats
2014	6	10	4	-	20 seats
2008	8	9	3	-	20 seats
2002	7	10	3	-	20 seats

=== Coat of arms ===
The municipality’s arms might be described thus: A pall reversed wavy argent, dexter barry of six Or and gules, sinister gules a demi-wheel of the first divided palewise the rim towards sinister, the base azure.

The pall reversed (that is, upside-down Y-shape) symbolizes the forks of the rivers Main and Aschaff, which, in a way, also makes the arms canting, as the municipality’s name is drawn from a fusion of these two rivers’ names. The stripes on the dexter (armsbearer’s right, viewer’s left) side come from the arms formerly borne by the Counts of Rieneck, to whom parts of the municipality historically belonged. The halved wheel comes from the Electorate of Mainz’s coat of arms, the municipality having belonged to this state until 1803. The tinctures azure (blue) in the escutcheon’s base and argent (silver) in the pall reversed are Bavaria’s colours, which have flown over Mainaschaff since 1816.

The arms were conferred on Mainaschaff on 28 August 1968.

== Arts and culture ==
=== Theatre ===
Mainaschaff is home to the Puppenschiff marionette theatre.

Also found in the municipality is the Maintalhalle (“Main Valley Hall”) in which cultural and sporting events take place. The hall is known for its musical productions by the Aschaffenburg district Fachakademie für Sozialpädagogik (“Professional Academy for Social Work”) and the Edelweiß Mainaschaff singing club.

=== Buildings ===
The Kapellenberg, a big hill formerly serving as a vineyard from the 14th century onwards, with a chapel and a statue of Mary, is said to have been a pilgrimage site for the last hundred years, and is still the destination of many processions. Public institutions (a playground and others) have also made it into a well known outing destination. On this hill is found the entrance to an old grotto that nevertheless was never open to the public until this century. Winegrowing began on the hill once again in 2005.

=== Parks ===
The Mainparksee, a now 240 000 m² lake which came out of building work on the new Autobahn in the 1950s from a so-called Baggersee (a lake arising from an old quarry), offers a long-term camping ground and bathing. Since 2005, one of Germany’s biggest sauna areas has been located on the lands at the Mainparksee. It has been open to the public as a recreation area.

== Infrastructure ==
=== Transport ===
- Mainaschaff lies right on the Autobahn A 3 (Aschaffenburg West exit) and on Bundesstraße 8 between Kleinostheim and Aschaffenburg.
- For local and long-distance travel, the Aschaffenburg - Frankfurt railway line can be reached through the main railway station in Aschaffenburg. The local transport running on the Aschaffenburg - Darmstadt line sometimes stops in Mainaschaff. The station stands at the intersection of Milanstraße and Bahnhofstraße, and has a park-and-ride facility.
- The municipality is linked to the town and regional bus service of the Verkehrsgesellschaft Untermain (“Lower Main Transport Company”), and is served by route 14 (town bus) and route 51 (regional bus to Kahl-Hanau).
