= Haibach, Lower Franconia =

Haibach
- Municipality
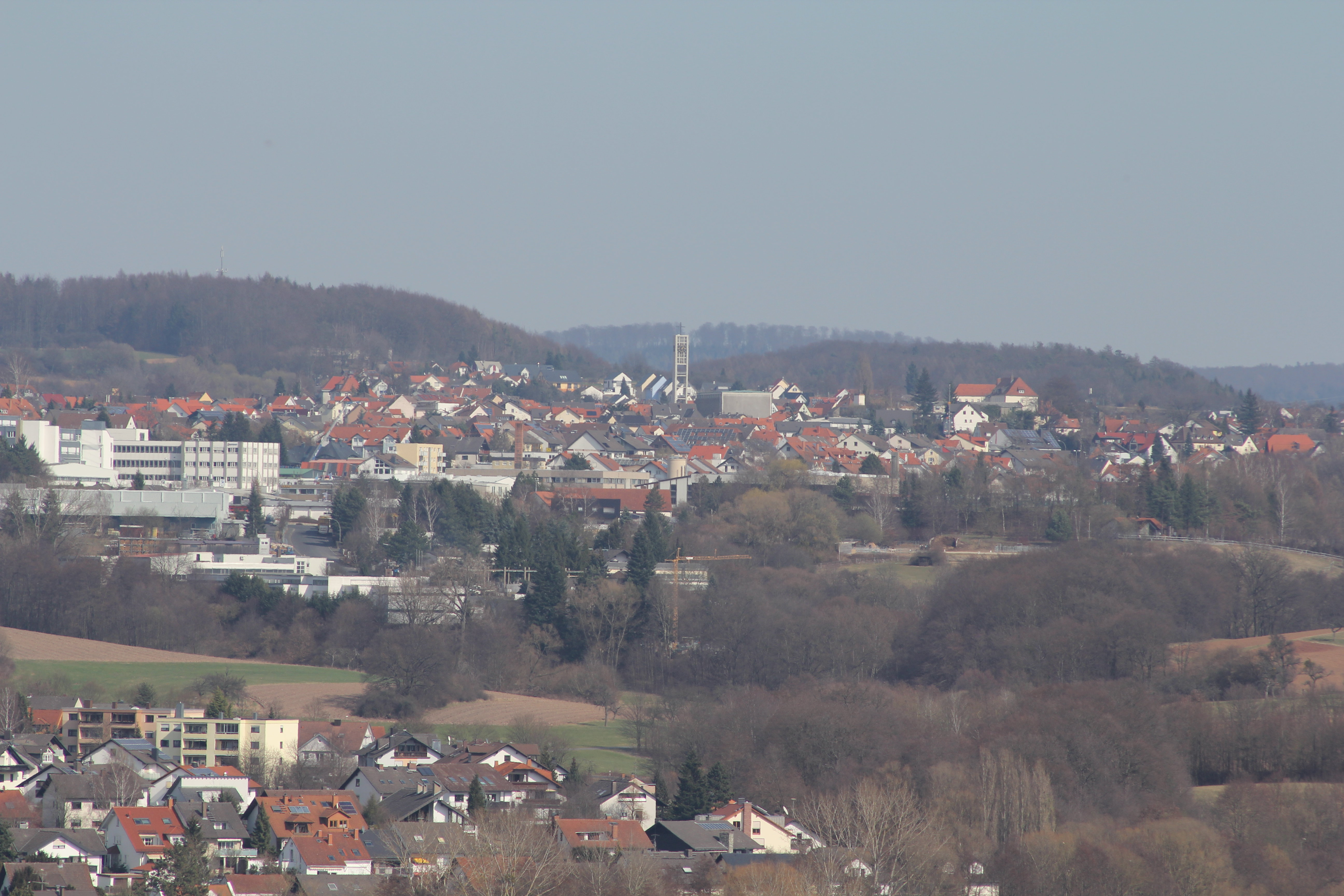
- Haibach seen from Erbig

- Coat of arms

- Location of Haibach within Aschaffenburg district
- Interactive map of Haibach
- Location within Germany Location within Bavaria
- Coordinates: 49°58′03″N 09°11′49″E
- Country: Germany
- State: Bavaria
- Admin. region: Unterfranken
- District: Aschaffenburg
- Subdivisions: 3 Ortsteile

Government
  - Mayor (2020–26): Andreas Zenglein (CSU)

Area
  - Total: 7.35 km^{2} (2.84 sq mi)
- Elevation: 280 m (920 ft)

Population (2025-12-31)
  - Total: 7,977
  - Density: 1,090/km^{2} (2,810/sq mi)
- Time zone: UTC+01:00 (CET)
  - Summer (DST): UTC+02:00 (CEST)
- Postal codes: 63808
- Dialling codes: 06021
- Vehicle registration: AB
- Website: www.haibach.de

Haibach (German pronunciation: [ˈhaɪbax]) is a municipality in the Aschaffenburg district in the Regierungsbezirk of Lower Franconia (Unterfranken) in Bavaria, Germany. It has a population of around 8,300.

== Geography ==
=== Location ===
Gemeindeteile

The municipality lies east-south-east of the town of Aschaffenburg on the western edge of the Spessart (range) between the town and the hills' well-known landmark Mespelbrunn Castle. The highest elevations in the municipal area are the Findberg and the Buchberg. They reach some 330 m above NHN. Haibach is located in the Spessart Nature Park (Naturpark Spessart)

=== Municipal territory ===
The municipal area can be divided into the "village", a development area and an industrial area. The village (Dorf) accounts for the biggest part of Haibach and lies to the north. Buildings there are mainly older terraced houses, not higher than two floors. Here, too, is the municipality centre consisting of the church, various grocery shops and the fire station.

On a hill lies Haibach's development area, which consists of larger detached new structures.

The industrial area lies on Würzburger Straße/State Road 2312 (formerly the B 8) to the south. Found there are the industrial parts of the municipality, like Adler Modemärkte GmbH.

The constituent municipalities of Grünmorsbach and Dörrmorsbach are located in the south. Dörrmorsbach is found at the foot of the Pfaffenberg, whose distinctive building development is widely visible in the Spessart.

The municipal territory of Haibach includes a lot of woodlands made up mostly of mixed forest.

=== Constituent municipalities ===
Haibach's Ortsteile are Haibach, Grünmorsbach and Dörrmorsbach.

=== Climate ===
The climate is moderate and warm. Haibach represents a meteorological divide between the Main Plain and the High Spessart.

== History ==
Haibach had its first documentary mention in 1187. At the time there was a noble seat called Ketzelburg on the edge of the municipality, whose ruins were archaeologically explored in 2004 and 2005.

Haibach's original name was Haginaha, meaning "Border Brook". Over the course of 500 years the name became Hegebach, Heybach and Haydebach until 1790 when it settled on the current form.

The brook Haibach is part of the Röderbach.

In the course of municipal reform in 1978, the former municipality of Dörrmorsbach was amalgamated with Haibach. As early as 1972, Grünmorsbach had been swallowed up into the greater municipality.

In the Bavaria State Development Plan (Landesentwicklungsplan Bayern), Haibach is set out as a small centre and is among the most progressive municipalities in the Vorspessart and Lower Main regions.

Out of the original residential and farming village, Haibach developed after the Second World War into more of a preferred residential municipality in the Aschaffenburg region. With small and midsize industrial and craft businesses locating here, the municipality was strengthened in its economic performance and tax base. A school centre with primary school and Hauptschule was built in 1965 and three kindergartens sponsored by the Catholic church administration and the Saint John organizations were established.

In 1974 the municipality built the volunteer fire brigade a new fire station. In 1977, the sport centre with a cultural and sport hall and a stadium were brought into service. A water cistern on the Buchberg and the a funerary hall in the Waldfriedhof ("Forest Graveyard") followed by 1983. In May 1983, the youth and clubhouse was brought into service.

On 21 June 1987, an arson attack by the terrorist group Rote Zora on the Haibach location of the Adler chain of clothing shops failed.

In 1988 and 1989, the sport hall Am Hohen Kreuz ("At the High Cross") was built. On 3 May 2001, the new municipality centre in the constituent municipality of Dörrmorsbach was dedicated.

The municipality's landmark is three crosses on the Bessenbacher Weg playground. They recall the legend of the knight Heydebach and his lady love.

The municipality's status of "market municipality" was never officially celebrated or announced.

== Demographics ==
=== Religion ===
There are three Catholic churches in the municipality:

- St. Nikolaus von der Flüe, Haibach
- St. Johannes der Täufer, Grünmorsbach
- St. Johannes der Täufer, Grünmorsbach (old church under monumental protection)
- St. Laurentius, Dörrmorsbach

There is also one Protestant church:

- Paul-Gerhardt-Kirche

== Economy ==
In Haibach are found, among others, the head office of the Adler chain of clothing shops, the German headquarters of Macrovision Corporation and the European headquarters of Renzi AG.

== Government ==
=== Mayor ===
Since 2006, Andreas Zenglein (CSU) has been Haibach's mayor.

=== Municipal council ===
The municipal council consists of 20 directly elected council members and the Mayor.

The most recent municipal council election was held on 15 March 2020, and the results were as follows:

	CSU	SPD	FWG	AfD	Total
2020	9	6	4	1	20 seats

In January 2023, three local councilors left the CSU council group and have since formed the new group MfH (Miteinander für Haibach).

=== Coat of arms ===
The municipality's arms might be described thus: Argent a bend wavy gules surmounted by a wheel spoked of six of the first, in chief an oak twig vert in bend, in base three Latin crosses sable in bend.

The wavy bend (slanted stripe) stands for the placename ending —bach, which means “brook” in German. The oak twig refers to the municipality's location in the western Spessart, where there is still an extensive stand of oaks. The six-spoked Wheel of Mainz was taken from the arms borne by the Archbishopric and Electorate of Mainz, to whose lordly territory Haibach belonged for centuries. The origin and meaning of the three crosses that stand on Bessenbacher Weg in Haibach are no longer known. They are a landmark tied with a local legend.

The arms have been borne since 1966.

=== Town twinning ===
- Marck, Pas-de-Calais, France

== Infrastructure ==
=== Transport ===
- Bus routes to Aschaffenburg: 5 (to Dörrmorsbach), 16, 40, 41, 47
- Autobahn A 3 between Frankfurt (roughly 45 km away) and Würzburg (roughly 75 km away).

== Education ==
- Haibach primary school and Hauptschule with Mittlere-Reife-Zug
- Haibach primary school – Grünmorsbach branch
