= Pfaffenberg (Spessart) =

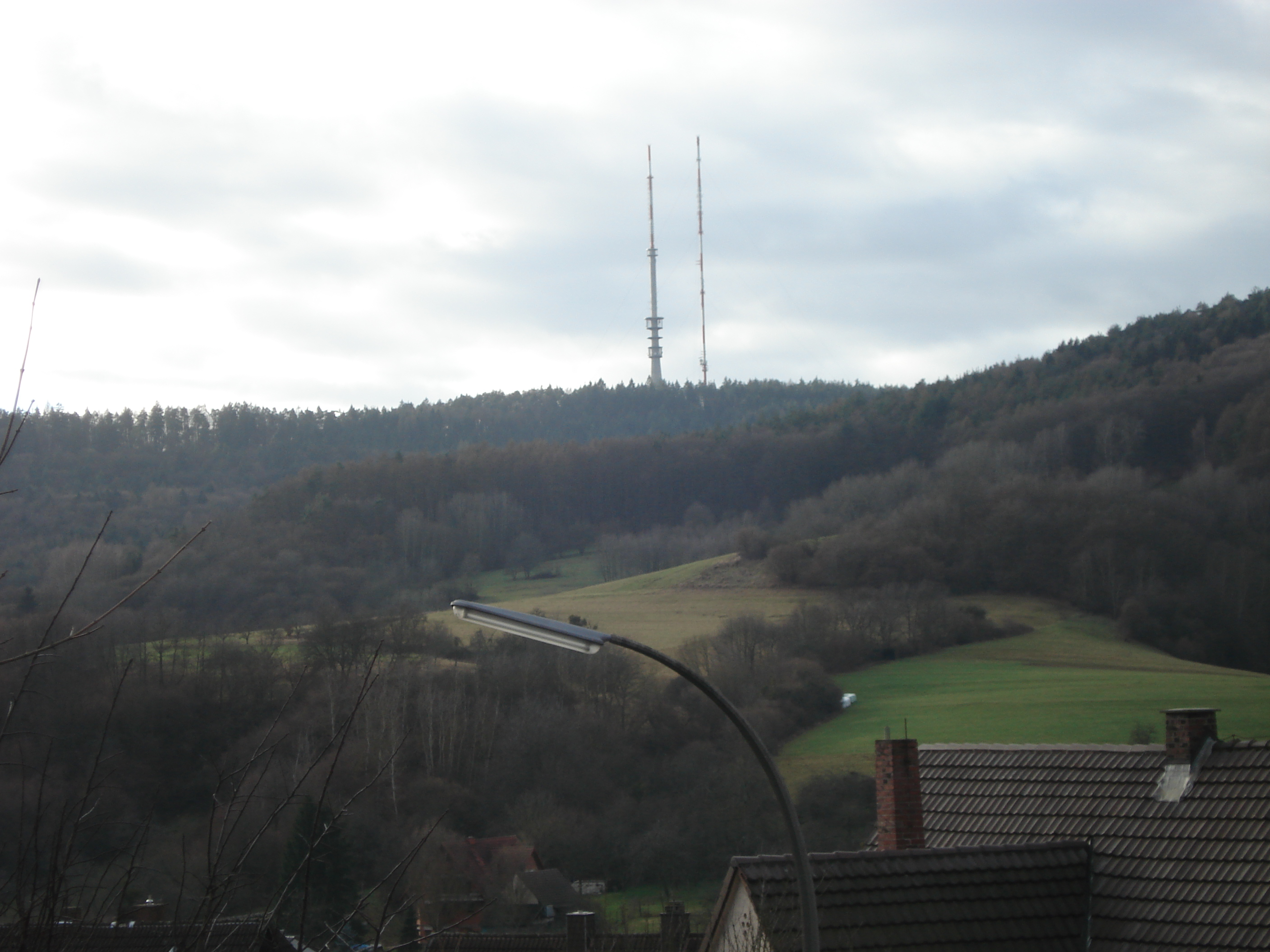

Highest point
- Elevation: 432 m (1,417 ft)
- Coordinates: 49°55′57″N 9°14′25″E

Geography
- Location within Bavaria
- Location: Bavaria, Germany
- Parent range: Spessart

Pfaffenberg is a 432-meter-high (1,417 ft) hill of Bavaria, Germany. The Pfaffenberg hill lies in the Spessart range in the districts of Aschaffenburg and Miltenberg.

== Geography ==
The Pfaffenberg is located in the municipal territories of Bessenbach and Sulzbach am Main. Northeast of peak is the village of Oberbessenbach in the valley of the Bessenbach, a creek. Southwest of the peak is the village of Soden (part of Sulzbach) in the valley of Sodener Bach. Northwest of the peak are the villages of Gailbach (a Stadtteil of Aschaffenburg) and Dörrmorsbach, part of Haibach. The boundaries of the town of Aschaffenburg reach almost to the summit. About two kilometers south-east is the Hohe Wart hill with the Hohe Wart Inn.

== Radio tower ==
Since 1953 the radio transmitter Sender Pfaffenberg of Bavarian state broadcaster Bayerischer Rundfunk has been situated on the top of Pfaffenberg. The guyed tubular steel tower was 181 meters tall. In 2008 a second shorter tower was built for Freeview. On 16 April 2010 the old pipe tower was removed. The new concrete tower is 176.05 meters tall.

== See also ==
- Mallersdorf-Pfaffenberg
- Pfaffenberg (Hohenstein-Ernstthal)
