= Nonnenbach (Aschaff) =

River in Bavaria, Germany

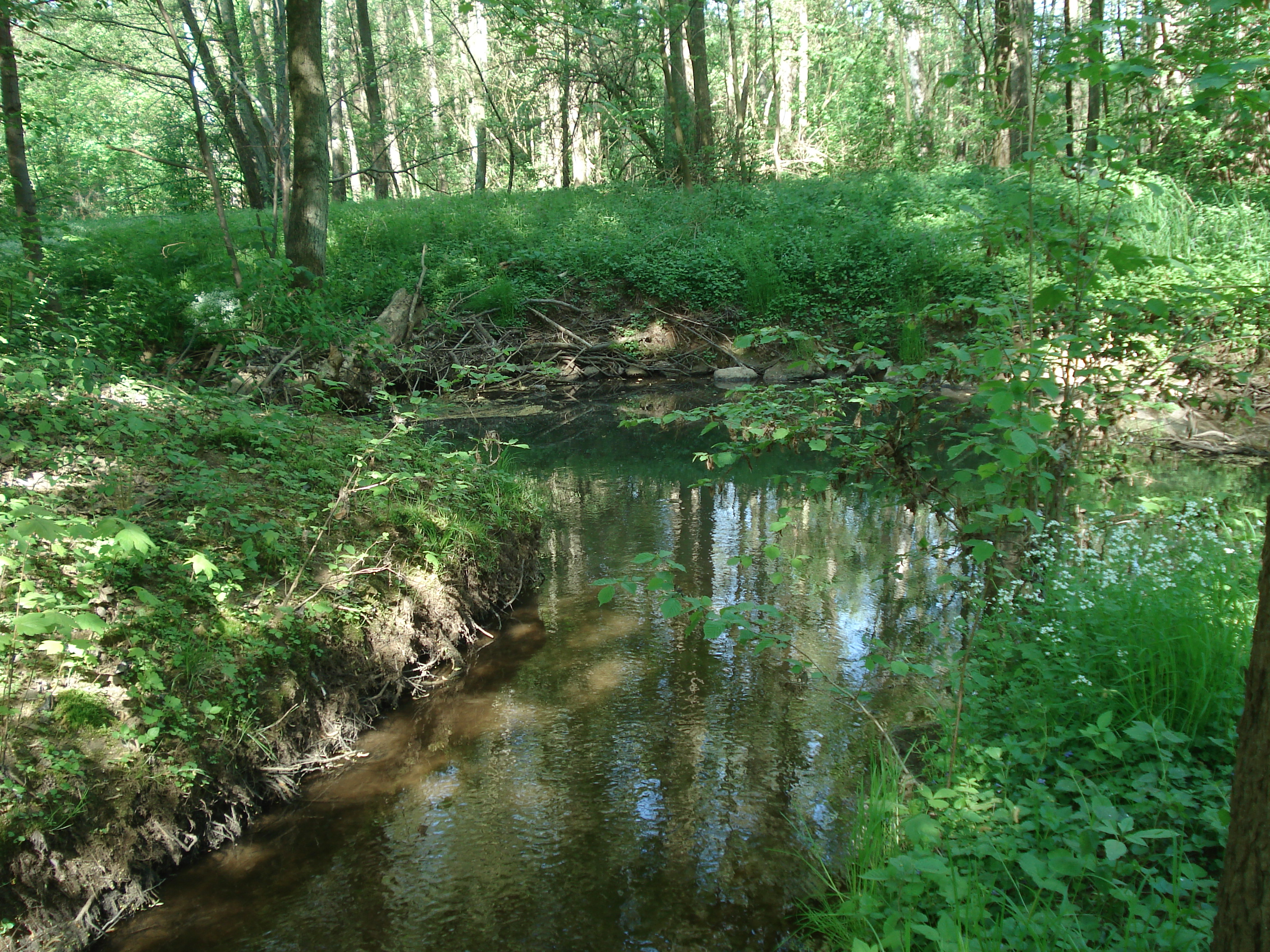
- The Nonnenbach (foreground), flowing into the Aschaff (background)

Location
- Country: Germany
- States: Bavaria

Physical characteristics
- Mouth
  - location: Aschaff
  - coordinates: 50.0023°N 9.2328°E

Basin features
- Progression: Aschaff→ Main→ Rhine→ North Sea

Nonnenbach is a small river of Bavaria, Germany. It is a left tributary of the Aschaff near Hösbach.

== See also ==
- List of rivers of Bavaria
