= Glattbach (river) =

River in Germany

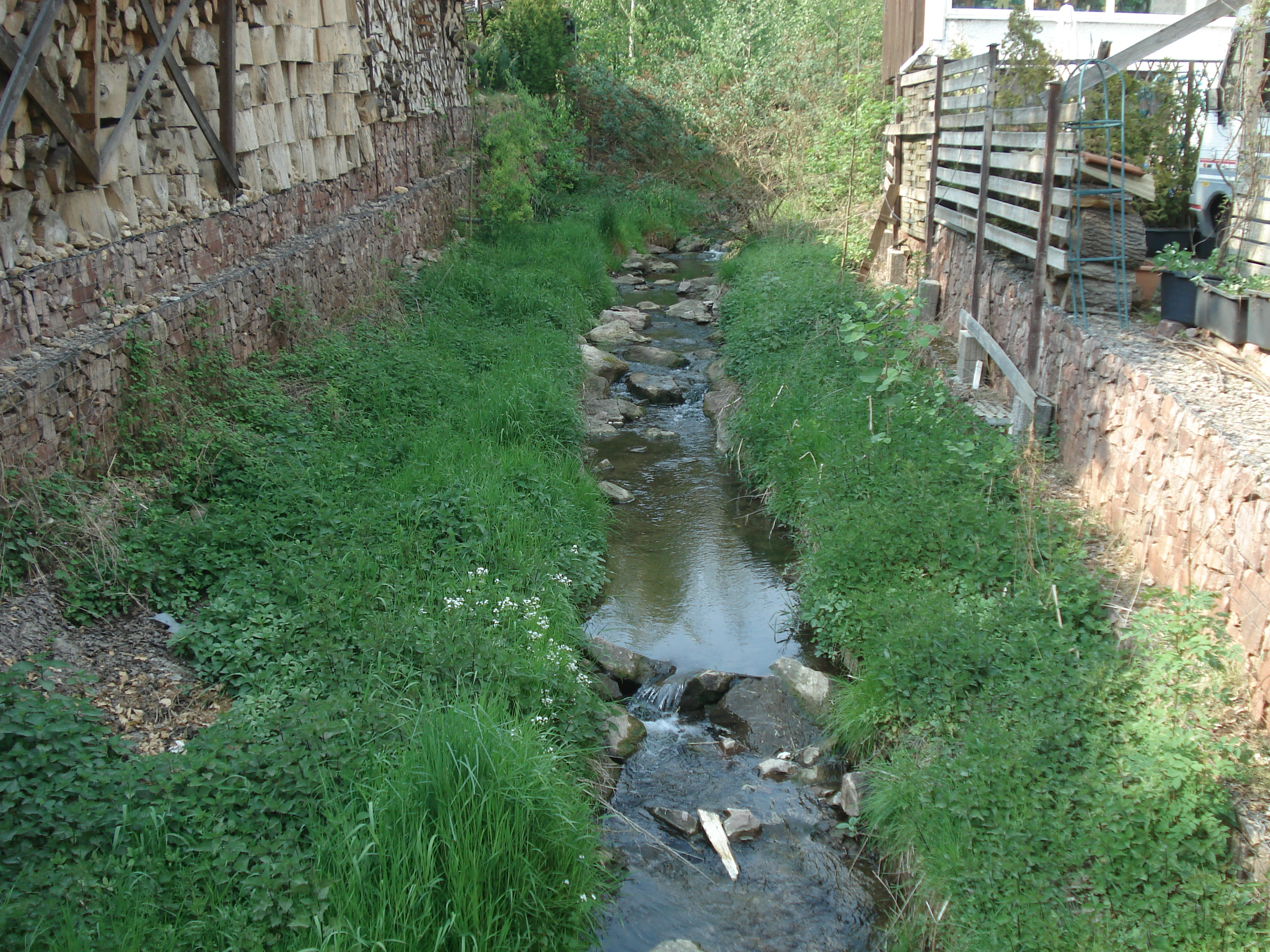
- The Glattbach in Aschaffenburg

Location
- Country: Germany
- States: Bavaria

Physical characteristics
- Mouth
  - location: Aschaff
  - coordinates: 49.9891°N 9.1509°E

Basin features
- Progression: Aschaff→ Main→ Rhine→ North Sea

Glattbach (German pronunciation: [ˈɡlatbax]) is a small river of Bavaria, Germany. It flows into the Aschaff near Aschaffenburg.

== See also ==
- List of rivers of Bavaria
