= Grafenberg =

Grafenberg may mean:

- Düsseldorf-Grafenberg, a borough of Düsseldorf
- Grafenberg (Reutlingen), a town in Baden-Württemberg, Germany
- Grafenberg (Strengberg), a village in Austria
- Grafenberg (Wolfsbach), a village in Austria
- Ernst Gräfenberg, doctor known for developing the intrauterine device (IUD), and for his studies of the role of the woman's urethra in orgasm

== See also ==
- Gräfenberg (disambiguation)
