= Goldbach (Aschaff) =

River of Bavaria, Germany

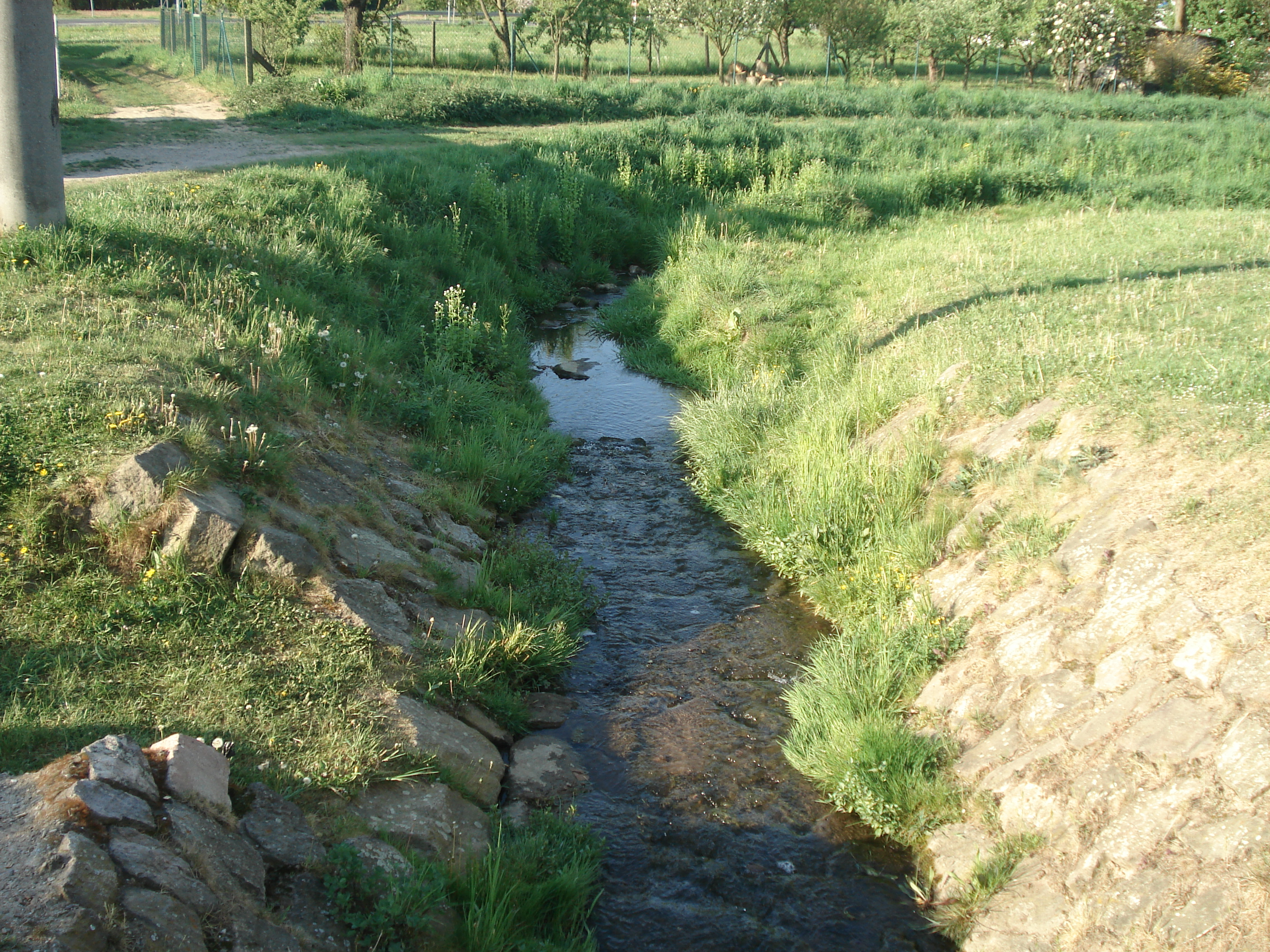
- Goldbach transition into Flutgraben

Location
- Country: Germany
- States: Bavaria

Physical characteristics
- Mouth
  - location: Aschaff
  - coordinates: 49.9906°N 9.1627°E

Basin features
- Progression: Aschaff→ Main→ Rhine→ North Sea

Goldbach (German pronunciation: [ˈɡɔltbax]) is a small river of Bavaria, Germany. It is a right tributary of the Aschaff near Aschaffenburg. Its artificially created lower course is called Flutgraben.

== Etymology ==
The name "Goldbach" derives from the yellowish loess soil and an iron-rich mineral spring at one of its tributaries, which color the sediments of the streambed golden yellow. It gave the town of Goldbach its name.

== See also ==
- List of rivers of Bavaria
