= Gräfenberg Castle (Forchheim) =

Burg Gräfenberg
- Gräfenberg

Site information
- Type: lowland castle and settlement
- Code: DE-BY
- Condition: burgstall (no above-ground ruins)

Location
- Location within Germany
- Coordinates: 49°38′40″N 11°14′53″E
- Height: 430 m above sea level (NHN)

Site history
- Built: recorded in 1477

Gräfenberg Castle (German: Burg Gräfenberg) is the older of two former castles in Gräfenberg in the Upper Franconian county of Forchheim in the south German state of Bavaria. Today, there is little left of the castle; it is classed as a burgstall and the site is in the area of Bahnhofstraße 11 to 21. The castle was first recorded in the year 1477; its last remains were removed from about 1563.

== Literature ==
- Robert Giersch, Andreas Schlunk, Berthold Frhr. von Haller: Burgen und Herrensitze in der Nürnberger Landschaft. Altnürnberger Landschaft, Lauf an der Pegnitz, 2006, ISBN 978-3-00-020677-1, pp. 141–142.
- Denis André Chevalley (revision editor) (1986). "Oberfranken". In Michael Petzet, Bayerisches Landesamt für Denkmalpflege [in German] (ed.). Denkmäler in Bayern : Ensembles, Baudenkmäler, archäologische Geländedenkmäler [Monuments in Bavaria: ensembles, monuments, archaeological site memorials]. Denkmäler in Bayern (in German). Vol. IV (Various ed.). München: Oldenbourg. ISBN 3-486-52395-3.
