= Bessenbach (river) =

River in Germany

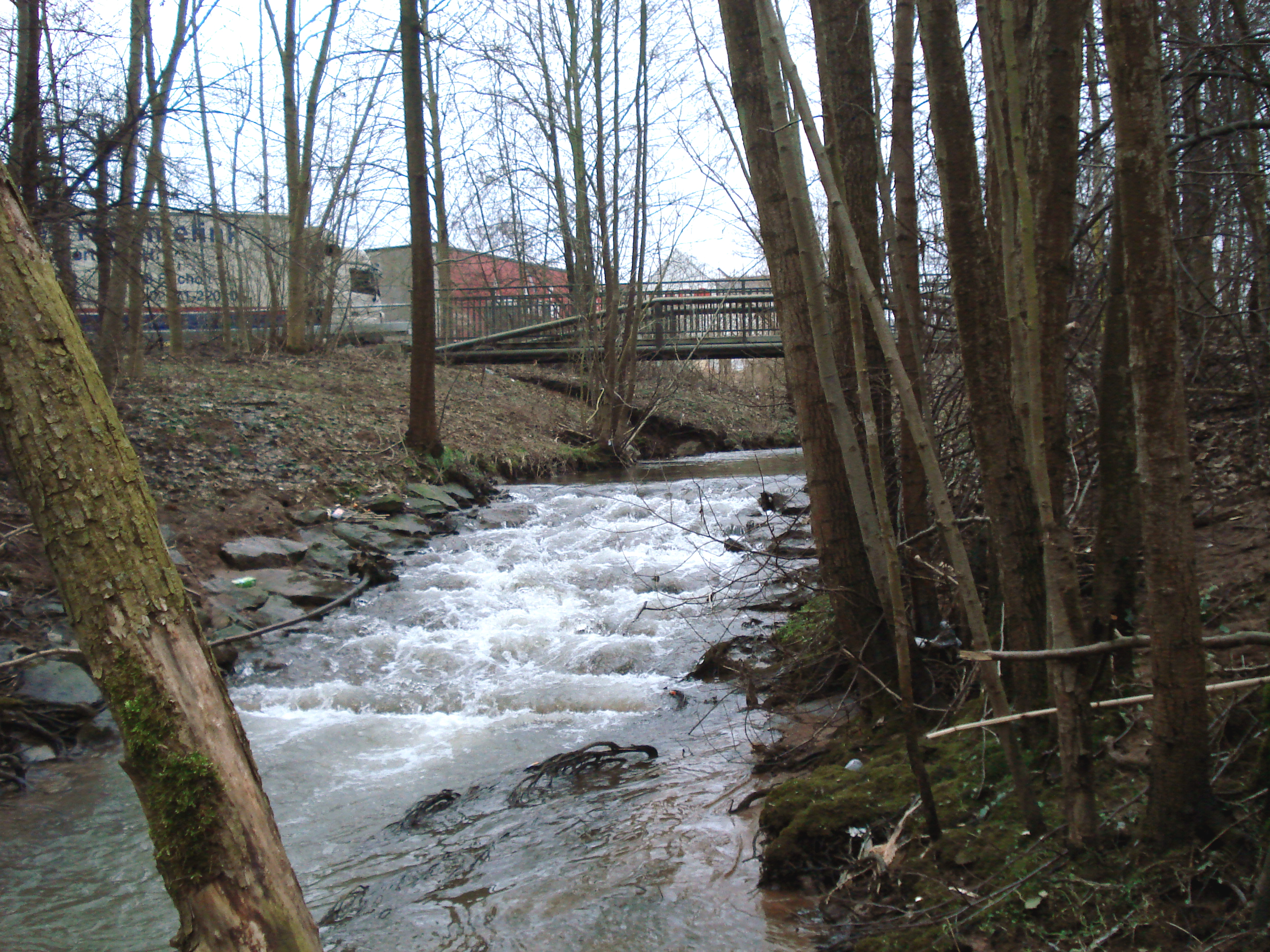
- The Bessenbach shortly before its mouth

Location
- Country: Germany
- State: Bavaria

Physical characteristics
- Mouth
  - location: Aschaff
  - coordinates: 49.9857°N 9.2555°E
- Length: 8.1 km

Basin features
- Progression: Aschaff→ Main→ Rhine→ North Sea

Bessenbach is a river of Bavaria, Germany. It flows into the Aschaff near Waldaschaff.

The source of the Bessenbach is in Oberbessenbach, where it rises as the Kirschlingsbach, 317m above sea level. The river is 8.1 km in length.

== See also ==
- List of rivers of Bavaria
