= Pfaffenberg (Wendelsheim) =

Mountain in Baden-Württemberg, Germany

Coordinates: 48°31′02″N 8°57′04″E

Highest point
- Elevation: 472 m (1,549 ft)

Geography
- Location: Baden-Württemberg, Germany

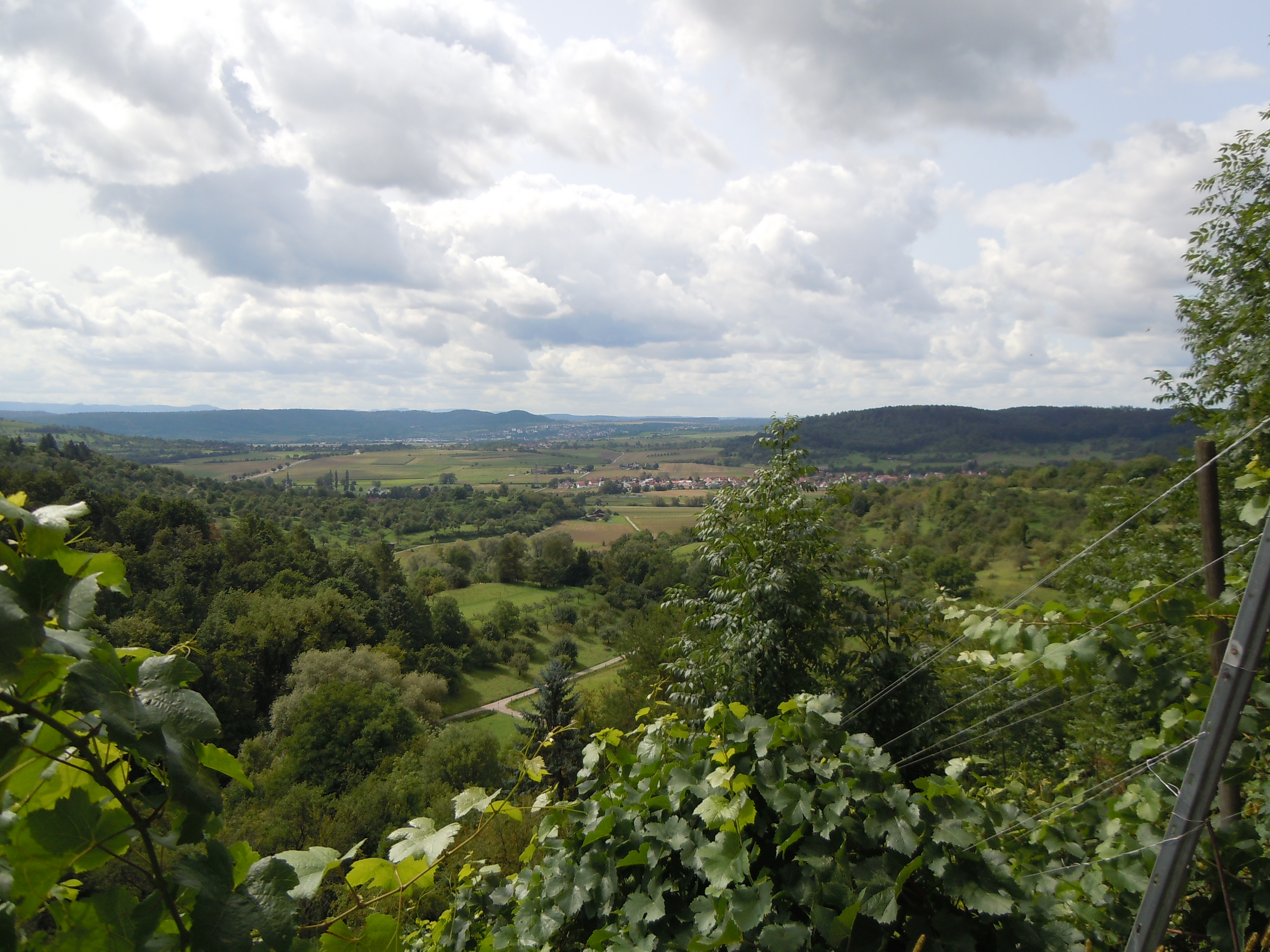

Pfaffenberg (Wendelsheim) is a mountain of Baden-Württemberg, Germany.
