= Röderbach (Aschaff) =

River in Germany

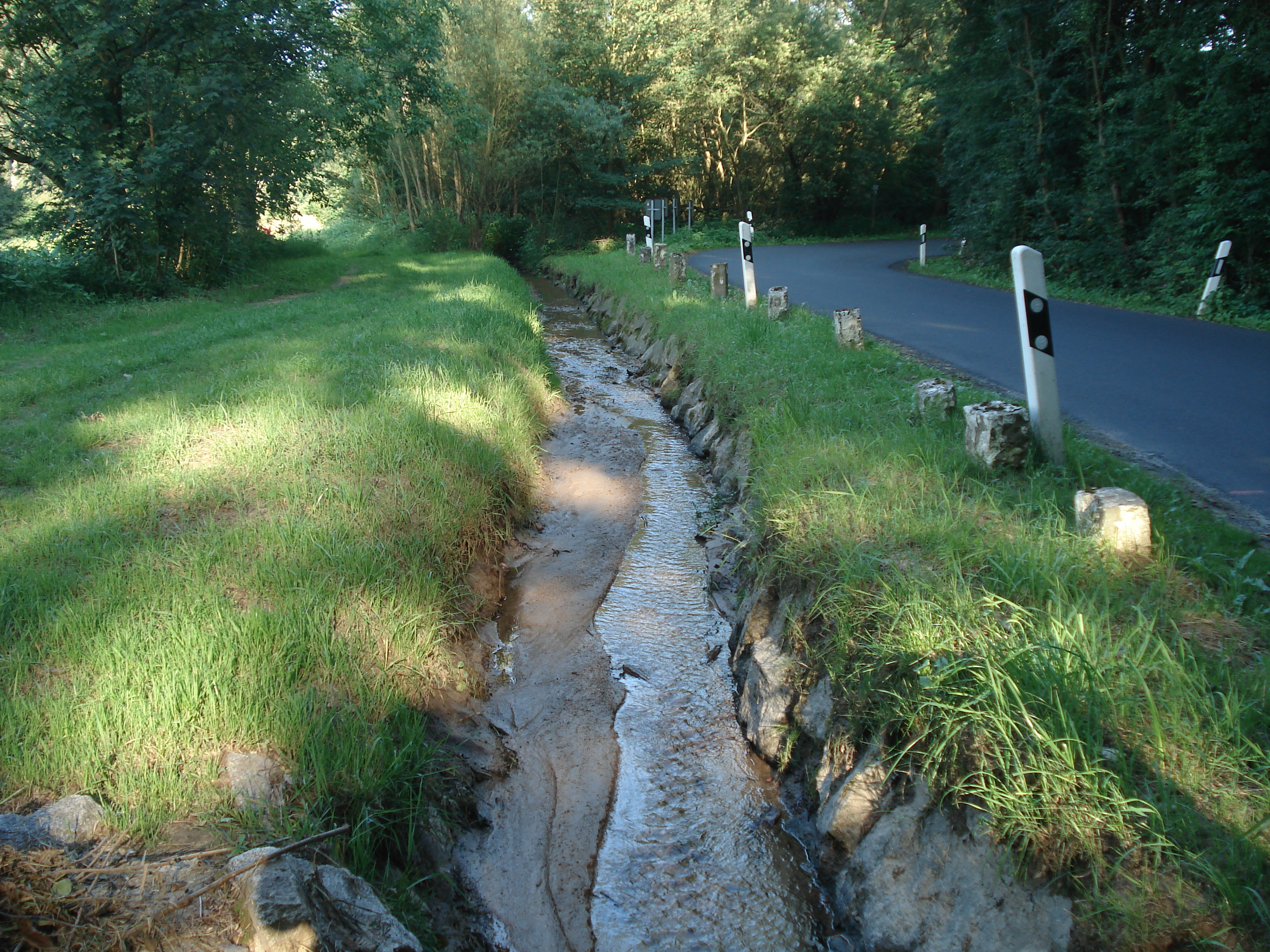
- The Röderbach upstream of Aschaffenburg

Location
- Country: Germany
- State: Bavaria

Physical characteristics
- Mouth
  - location: Aschaff
  - coordinates: 49°59′26″N 09°10′18″E

Basin features
- Progression: Aschaff→ Main→ Rhine→ North Sea

Röderbach is a river of Bavaria, Germany. It is a left tributary of the Aschaff near Goldbach.

== See also ==
- List of rivers of Bavaria
