= Waldaschaff =

- Municipality
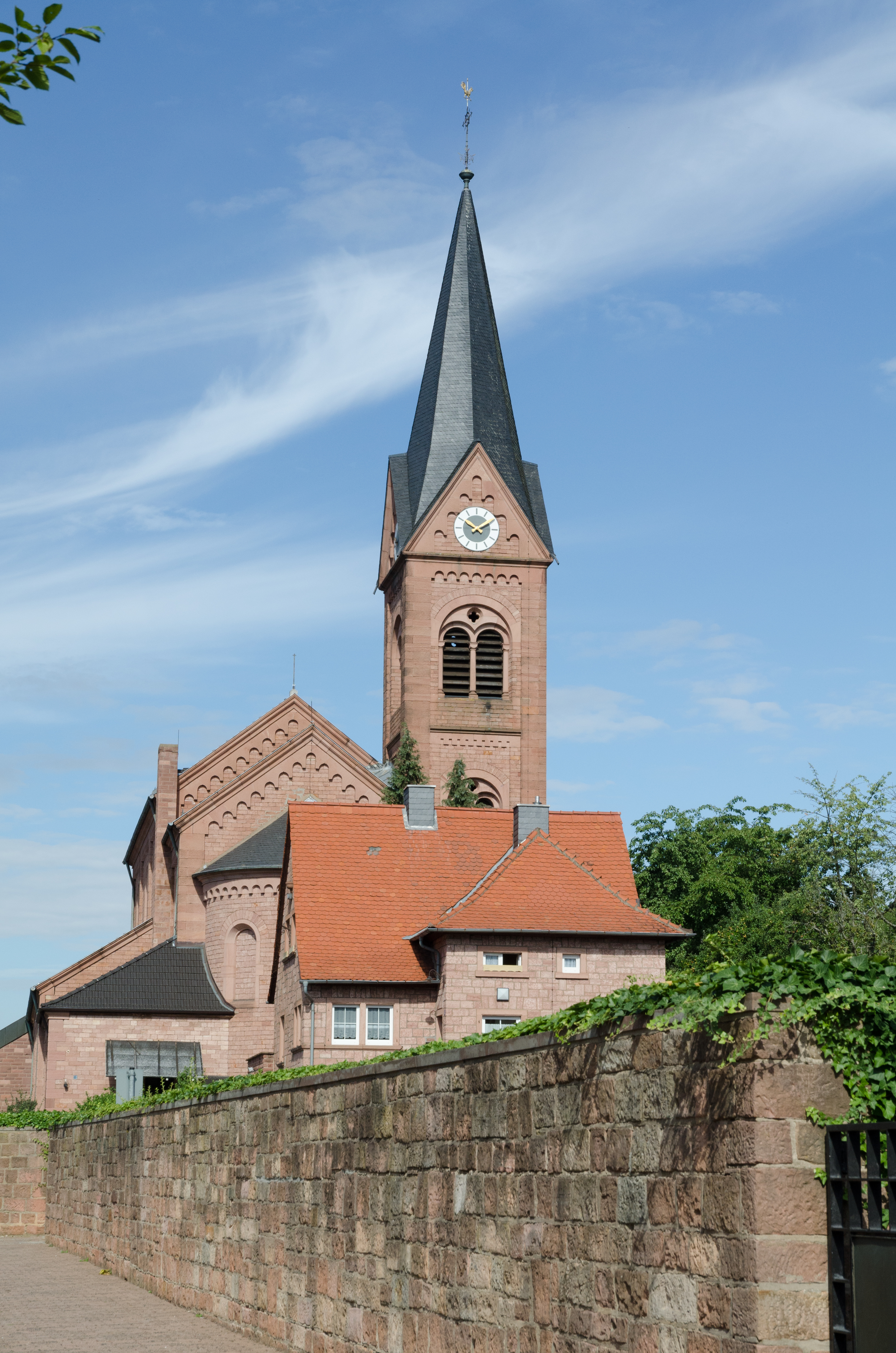
- Church of Saint Michael

- Coat of arms

- Location of Waldaschaff within Aschaffenburg district
- Interactive map of Waldaschaff
- Location within Germany Location within Bavaria
- Coordinates: 49°58′N 9°18′E
- Country: Germany
- State: Bavaria
- Admin. region: Unterfranken
- District: Aschaffenburg

Government
  - Mayor (2020–26): Marcus Grimm (CSU)

Area
  - Total: 6.60 km^{2} (2.55 sq mi)
- Elevation: 195 m (640 ft)

Population (2025-12-31)
  - Total: 4,053
  - Density: 614/km^{2} (1,590/sq mi)
- Time zone: UTC+01:00 (CET)
  - Summer (DST): UTC+02:00 (CEST)
- Postal codes: 63857
- Dialling codes: 06095
- Vehicle registration: AB
- Website: www.waldaschaff.de

Waldaschaff is a municipality in the Aschaffenburg district in the Regierungsbezirk of Lower Franconia (Unterfranken) in Bavaria, Germany.

== Geography ==
=== Location ===
Gemeindeteile

The municipality lies at the threshold of the High Spessart (range), roughly 15 km from Aschaffenburg and roughly 65 km from Frankfurt am Main. Like many villages in this part of the country, Waldaschaff is a linear settlement, following a road. Around the village are found the woodlands of the Spessart Nature Park (Naturpark Spessart) and 2 km to the north west, the Steinknückl peak.

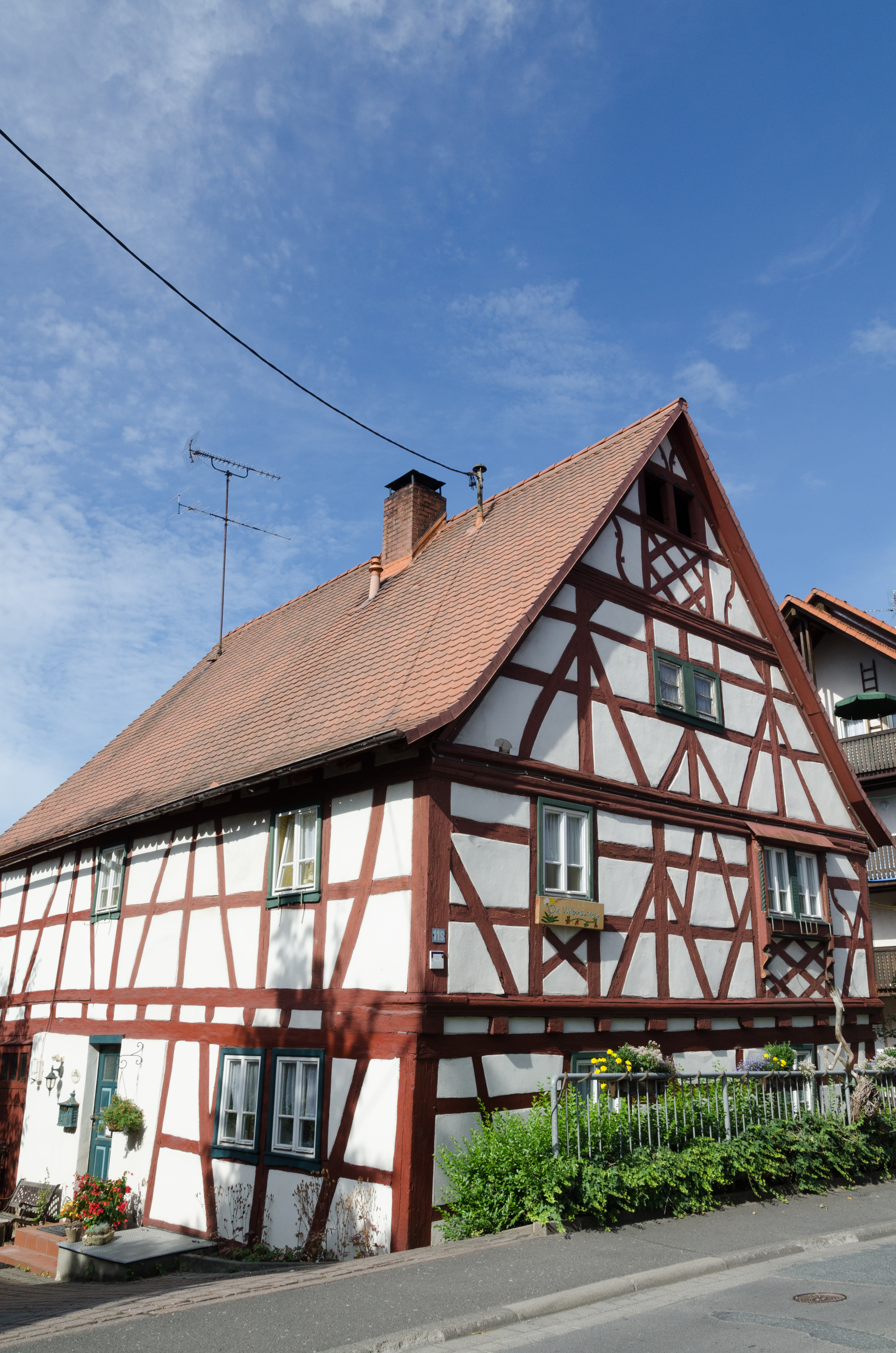
Fachwerkhaus in Waldaschaff

== History ==
=== Recent history ===
The municipality's upswing and development into modernity are closely linked with mayor Herbert Brehm's name. Important projects during his mayoralty were things such as opening up building development areas like Breite Wiese, dredging the Aschaff for flood control, and laying down requirements for further development at the YMOS metalworks which were then being operated in the municipality, employing more than a thousand workers. Further businesses such as the drinks industry and tourism managed to blossom. Substantial infrastructure projects in waterworks and sewage and transport links were undertaken and successfully completed. The sport centre and the gymnasium came into being and were put into a developmental context with the Ebets building development area. In the zoning plan that was put forth, Brehm introduced the ideas for the Ebets building development area and the Heerbach commercial area, thereby laying decisive guidelines down, until his very early death, for the village's future development. Today, the municipality administration's eyes have been cast upon renewing the village's core. To this end, a consortium was formed. In 2006, the Ebets-Rodwiesen building development area had been fully opened up.

== Economy ==
=== Established businesses ===
The best known businesses in Waldaschaff are Waldaschaff Automotive GmbH, previously known as WAGON Automotive, a car supplier, and Bayerisches Münzkontor, a mail order business specializing in collectibles. Also, many smaller companies have settled here owing to its favourable location.

== Government ==
=== Municipal council ===
The council is made up of 16 council members.

CSU	SPD	Total
9	7	16 seats
(as at municipal election held on 15 March 2020)

Elections in 2020:

- CSU: 9 seats
- SPD: 7 seats

=== Mayors ===
- 1966–1984: Herbert Brehm (SPD)
- 1984–2003: Peter Winter (CSU)
- since 2003: Marcus Grimm (CSU)

=== Town twinning ===
- (Republic of Ireland) Clonakilty, County Cork, Ireland

=== Coat of arms ===
The municipality's arms might be described thus: Gules a bend wavy argent surmounted by an oakleaf in bend vert, the stem to base, in chief a wheel of the second spoked of six, in base a cogwheel of the second.

The six-spoked silver wheel in red – the Wheel of Mainz – was the arms borne by the Archbishopric of Mainz, to which the municipality historically belonged until 1803. The wavy bend (slanted stripe) and the oakleaf stand for the municipality's location on the Aschaff in the Spessart forest, which has a wealth of oaktrees. Both the river and the forest (Wald in German) are parts of the municipality's name. The cogwheel symbolizes the industry that has sprung up in modern times, making it an important industrial location.

The arms have been borne since 21 August 1968.

== Infrastructure ==
=== Emergency services ===
The Waldaschaff fire brigade was founded in 1873 as a volunteer firefighting service. Until the 1950s, the Waldaschaff fire brigade's main task was fighting fires, until technical assistance, for instance on the Autobahn, came to the fore. Along with this came changes to the fire brigade's fleet, so that the Waldaschaff fire brigade now keeps 11 vehicles and three trailers, two of which are traffic safety trailers. The fleet also features various special vehicles like a turntable ladder and a lighting mast van.

The fire brigade's service area comprises the Autobahn (BAB 3) as far as Marktheidenfeld on the way to Würzburg, and in the other direction to the boundary with Hesse. Furthermore, the fire brigade is also tied into various emergency alert plans of the other district emergency services. It also claims a high figure of 200 to 300 operations each year, two thirds of which are “performances of technical assistance”, and the rest are shared between firefighting and guarding duties.

At the turn of the millennium, the Waldaschaff fire brigade founded the “First-Responder” (so-called even in German) group (FR). The FR group's job is, with qualified aid workers, to bridge the gap between the onset of an emergency and the arrival of the first emergency service vehicle. Its service area is the Waldaschaff area, although in exceptional circumstances it may be driven outside the area.

=== Transport ===
In the 2000s the municipality became known for a citizens’ initiative to move the Autobahn A 3 further away from the village. Waldaschaff lies right on this Autobahn and experienced – according to the citizens’ initiative – a great deal of harm from noise and exhaust, not least of all from the Kauppenbrücke, a long highway bridge over the municipality – one of the longest on this stretch of the Autobahn. The highway has now been relocated to the south and the old Kauppenbrücke was torn down.
