= Hösbach (river) =

River in Germany

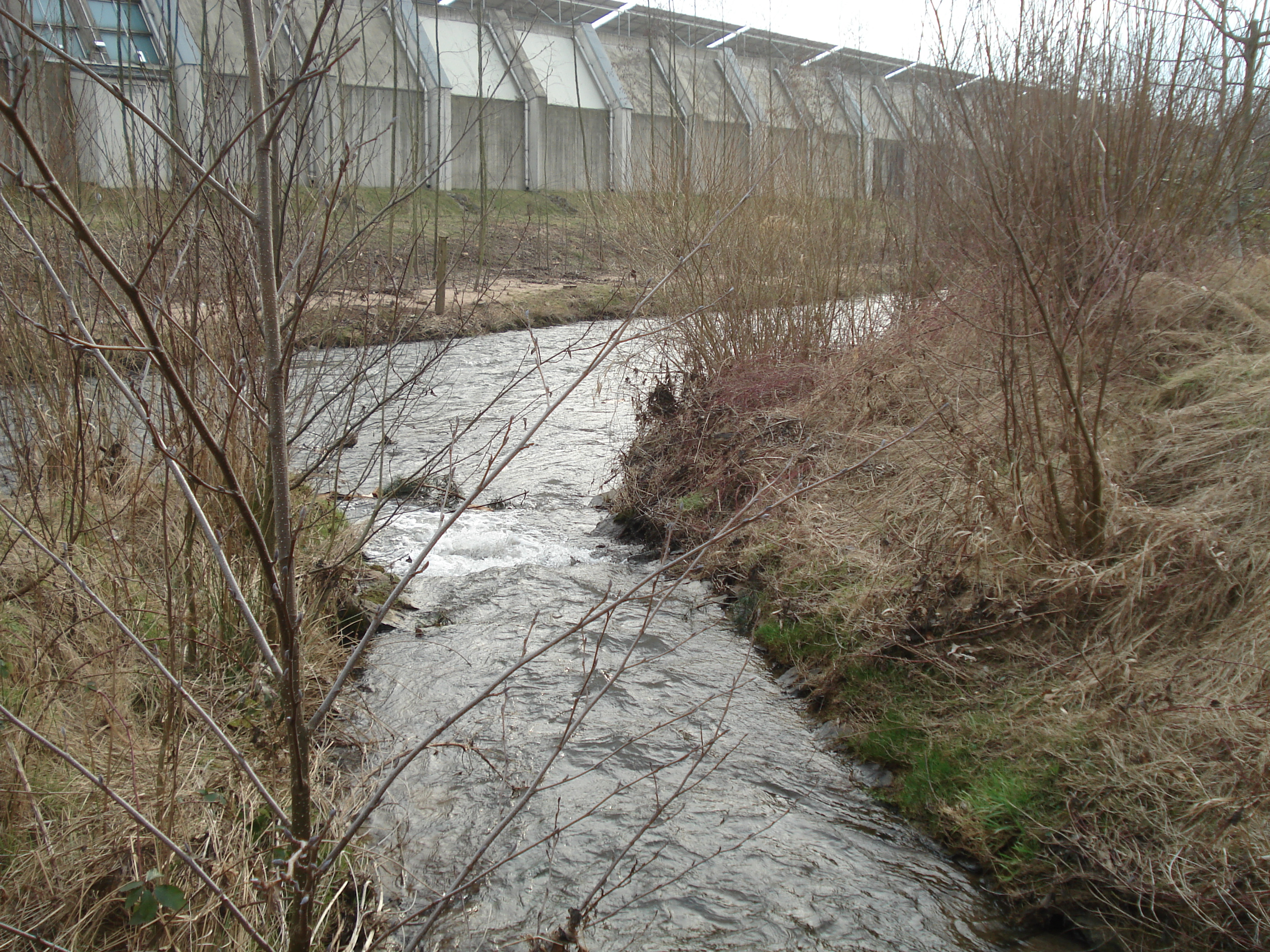
- The Hösbach shortly before its mouth

Location
- Country: Germany
- States: Bavaria

Physical characteristics
- Mouth
  - location: Aschaff
  - coordinates: 49.9999°N 9.2017°E

Basin features
- Progression: Aschaff→ Main→ Rhine→ North Sea

Hösbach is a river of Bavaria, Germany, at the market community Hösbach in the Aschaffenburg district in the Regierungsbezirk of Lower Franconia (Unterfranken).

It is about 5 km (3 mi) long and a right tributary of the Aschaff.

== See also ==
- List of rivers of Bavaria
