= Hösbach =

- Municipality
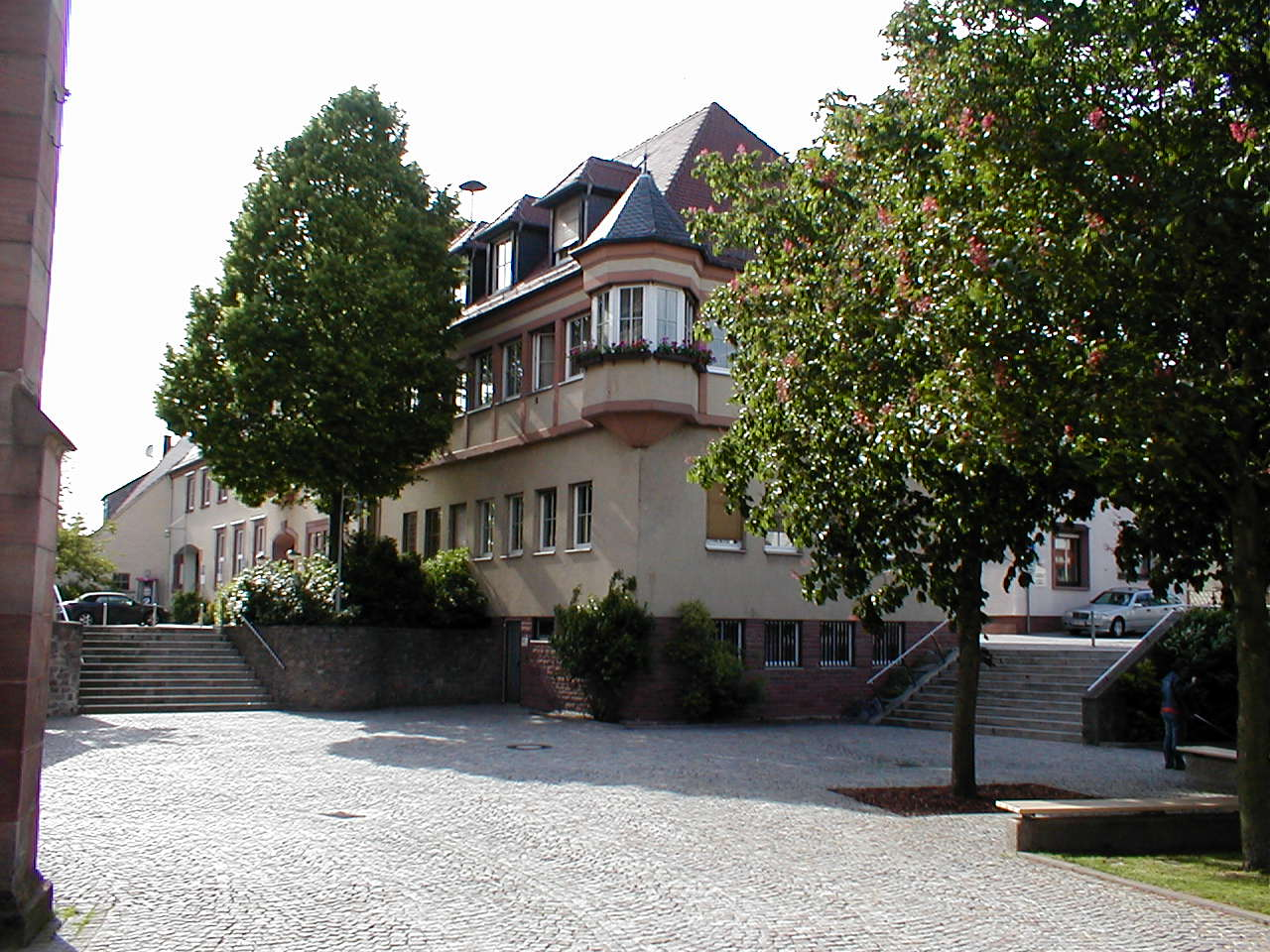
- Town hall

- Coat of arms

- Location of Hösbach within Aschaffenburg district
- Interactive map of Hösbach
- Location within Germany Location within Bavaria
- Coordinates: 50°00′N 9°12′E
- Country: Germany
- State: Bavaria
- Admin. region: Unterfranken
- District: Aschaffenburg
- Subdivisions: 6 Ortsteile

Government
  - Mayor (2023–29): Frank Houben (CSU)

Area
  - Total: 30.59 km^{2} (11.81 sq mi)
- Elevation: 144 m (472 ft)

Population (2025-12-31)
  - Total: 12,965
  - Density: 423.8/km^{2} (1,098/sq mi)
- Time zone: UTC+01:00 (CET)
  - Summer (DST): UTC+02:00 (CEST)
- Postal codes: 63768
- Dialling codes: 06021, 06024
- Vehicle registration: AB, ALZ
- Website: www.hoesbach.de

Hösbach is a market community and municipality in the Aschaffenburg district in the Regierungsbezirk of Lower Franconia (Unterfranken) in Bavaria, Germany. As of 2023, it has a population of 13,323.

== Geography ==
=== Location ===
Constituent municipalities

The municipality lies in the region of the Mittelgebirge Spessart known as Vorspessart, 5 km from Aschaffenburg, roughly 70 km from Würzburg and roughly 50 km from Frankfurt am Main. The Hösbach river, from which the municipality's name is derived, flows into the Aschaff within the municipal territory.

The central village of Hösbach is located in the valley of the Aschaff, next to the Bundesautobahn 3. However, the outlying villages are located in adjoining valleys and, in the case of Feldkahl and Rottenberg, actually in the watershed of the Kahl river.

=== Constituent municipalities ===
Hösbach has ten parts (Ortsteile) located across five districts (Gemarkungen). These are as follows (population numbers for 2011):

- Feldkahl (1,086)
- Hösbach (6,556)
  - Hösbach-Bahnhof (1,096)
- Rottenberg (1,661)
- Wenighösbach (982)
  - Münchhof
- Winzenhohl (1,969)
  - Aschaffsteg
  - Forsthaus
  - Schmerlenbach

=== Neighbouring municipalities ===
Hösbach borders (from the north, clockwise): Mömbris, Blankenbach, Sailauf, Bessenbach, Haibach, Aschaffenburg, Goldbach and Johannesberg.

== History ==
In 1189, Hösbach had its first documented mention as Hostebach: a Hermann de Hostebach and his son Conrad were named in a document from Archbishop Konrad of Mainz as witnesses. In 1218, the Schmerlenbach convent (in today's constituent municipality of Winzenhohl) was endowed by the Von Kugelberg family and granted the right of patronage over the Hösbach church. In the 13th century, the noble family of Hostebach died out, but the name Hösbach remained. Beginning in the 14th century, Forsthuben – a kind of woodland estate – were set up in Hösbach, which over the course of time further grew into large farms.

In 1781, there were only 120 houses with 591 inhabitants. These figures rose only very slowly over the following decades. Only in 1895 did the population figure surpass 2,000. In the years thereafter, Hösbach's growth came about more quickly through industrialization, especially in nearby Aschaffenburg, so that in 1905 there were already 2,518 people registered in the municipality, and by 1933 this had reached 3,388. War refugees during and after the Second World War swelled the population to 4,517 by 1946. Steady growth continued for many years.

Through municipal reforms in 1972 and 1978 the municipality of Hösbach expanded its land area by 1,981ha and its population by 4,500. At this time, the formerly self-administering small municipalities of Wenighösbach (1 January 1972), Feldkahl (1 July 1972), Rottenberg (1 May 1978) and Winzenhohl (1 May 1978) were amalgamated.

In the 1980s, Hösbach gained fame as the founding place of the rock band Böhse Onkelz.

On the occasion of its 800th jubilee, Hösbach was awarded the status of Markt (market municipality) on 29 September 1989.

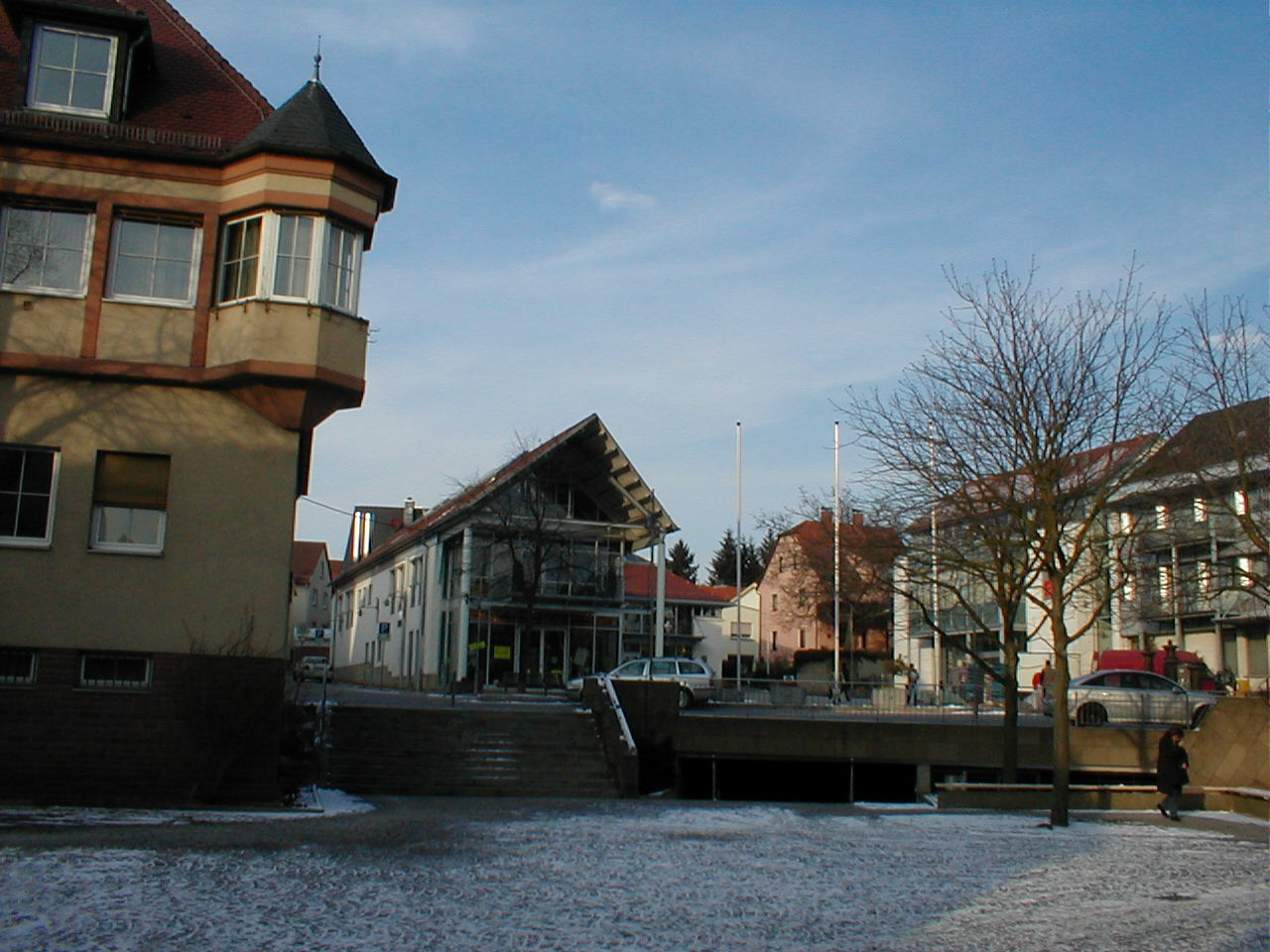
Town hall square

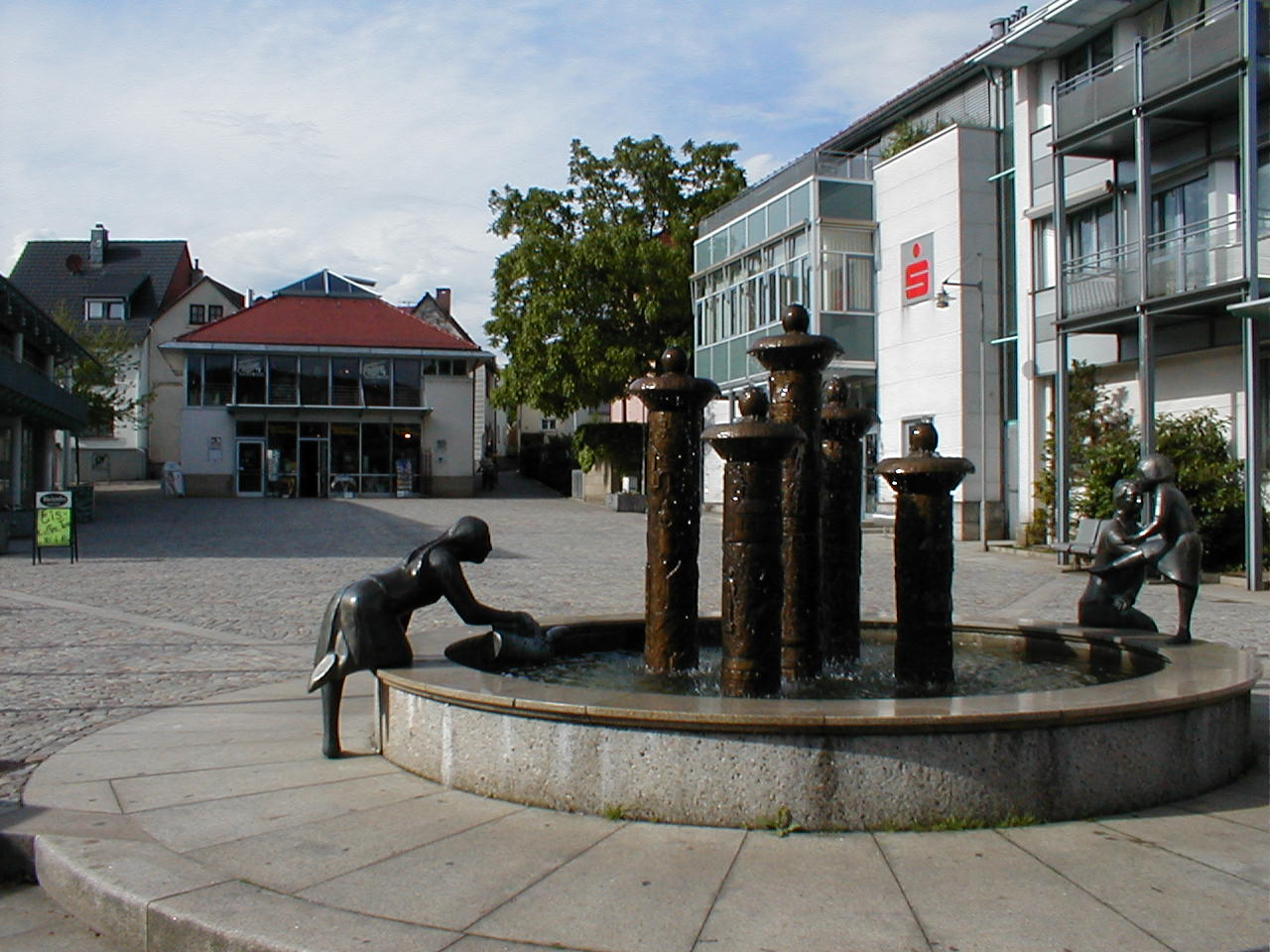
Fountain on the marketplace

== Governance ==
=== Municipal council ===
The council is made up of 24 council members, counting the mayor. In 2023, Frank Houben was elected as mayor.

	CSU	SPD	Greens	FW	FDP	WIR	Total
2008	13	4	3	5			25 seats
2020	9	4	4	3	1	3	24 seats

=== Coat of arms ===
The municipality's arms might be described thus: Party per pale gules a churchtower argent, argent a spur vert palewise above which an oak leaf of the third on whose stem bendwise an acorn Or.

Hösbach's most distinctive landmark, with its characteristic tower, is Saint Michael's parish church. The tower was included as a charge in the arms on the municipality's wishes, although in heraldically simplified form. The tinctures argent and gules (silver and red) refer to the municipality's former allegiance to the Archbishopric of Mainz. The Archiepiscopal forest officials, who oversaw the Spessart region, had their seat in Hösbach. The existence of this seat in Hösbach can be confirmed from the 14th century onwards. The charges on the escutcheon's sinister (armsbearer's left, viewer's right) side are attributes of this service, with the oak leaf and acorn representing the forest, and the spur the mounted officials themselves.

The arms have been borne since 1970.

== Arts and culture ==
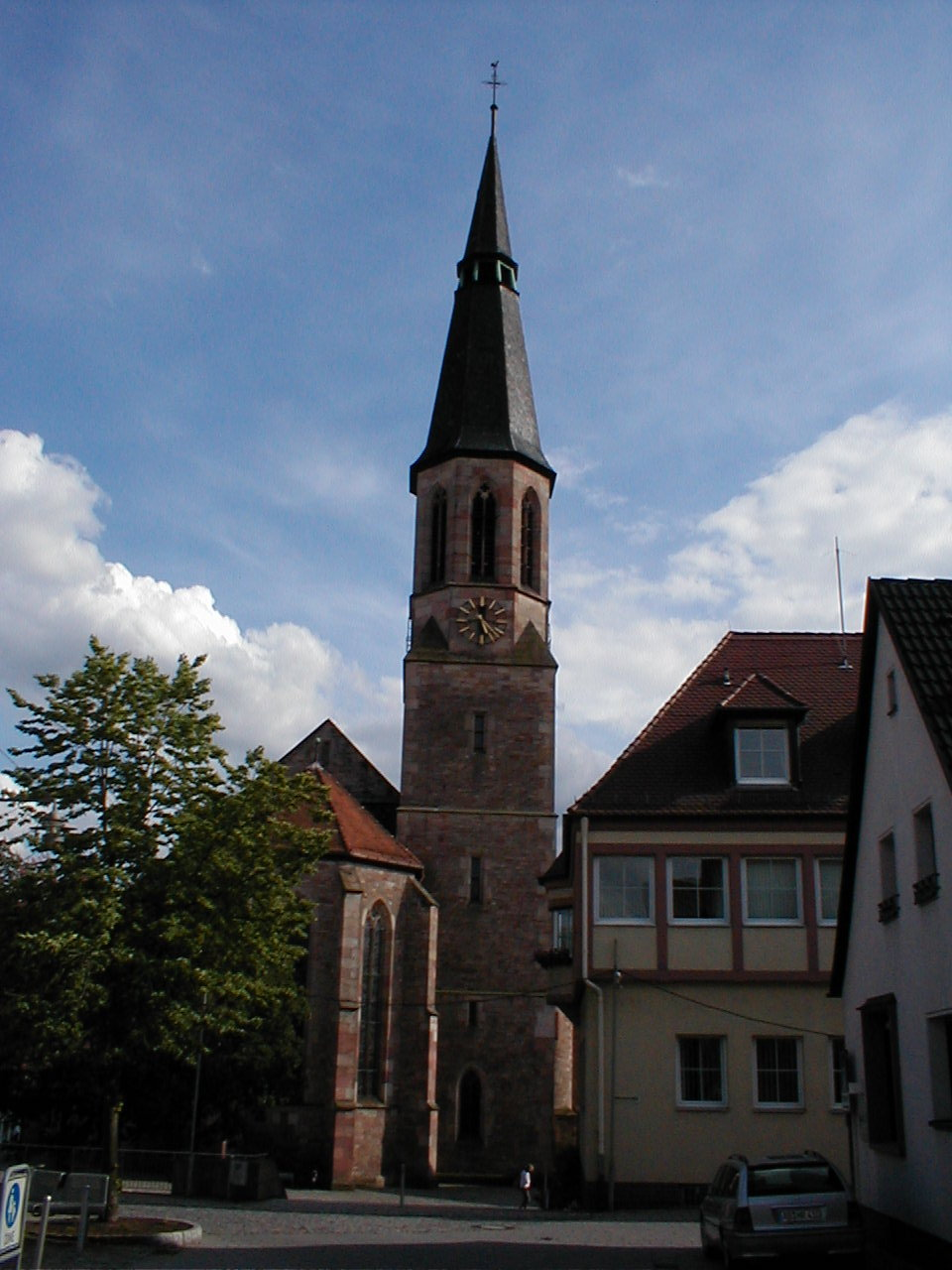
St. Michael parish church

=== Monuments ===
See also list of protected monuments in Hösbach

==== Churches and chapels ====
- Feldkahler Kapelle (Feldkahl)
- Marienkapelle (Rottenberg)
- St. Agatha (Schmerlenbach)
- St. Antonius von Padua (Rottenberg)
- St. Barbara (Wenighösbach)
- St. Johannes (Hösbach)
- St. Johannes Nepomuk (Feldkahl)
- St. Michael (Hösbach)
- Zur Mutterschaft Mariens (Hösbach-Bahnhof)

== Infrastructure ==
=== Transport ===
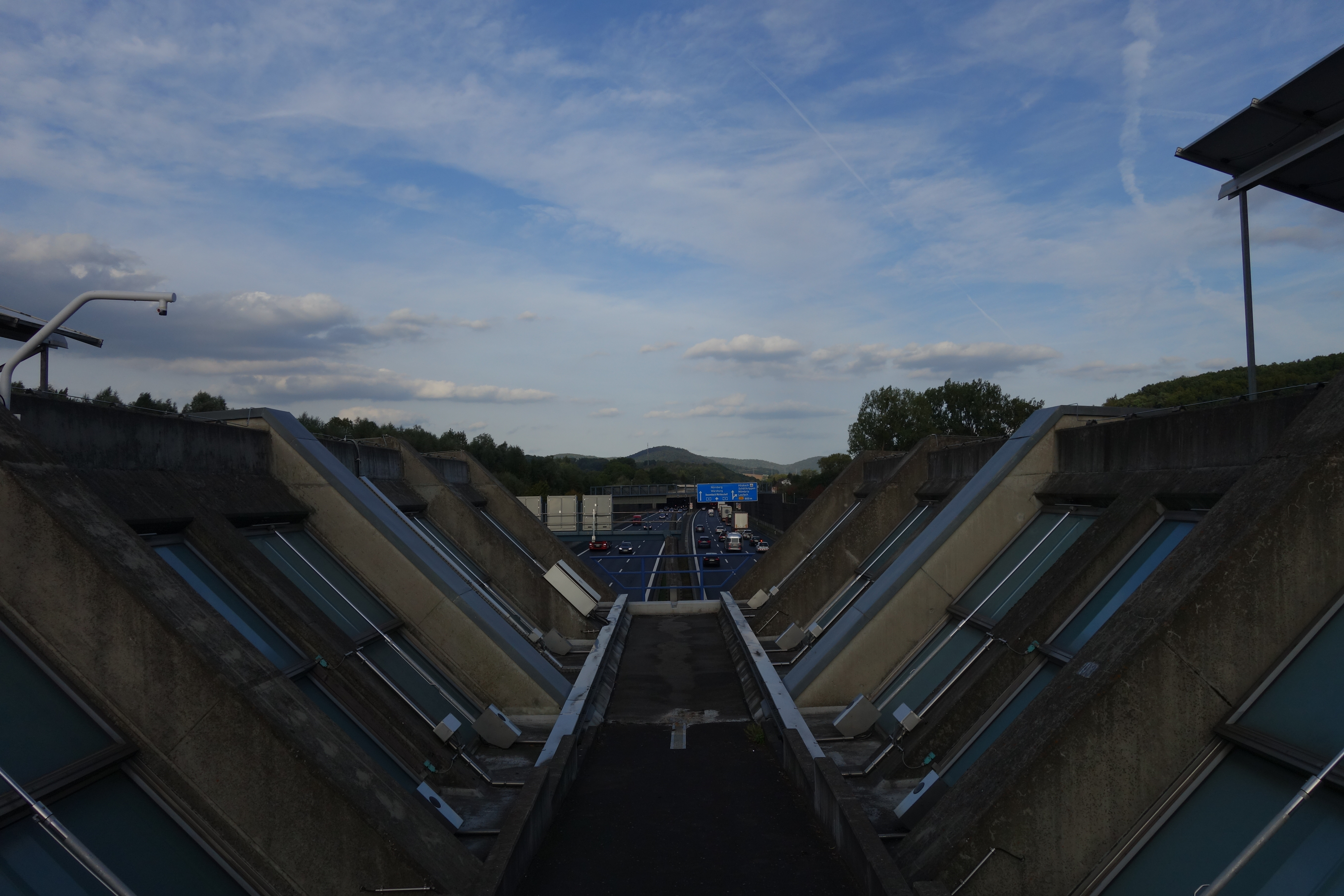
View from Mühlstraße to east above the overhead noise barrier of Bundesautobahn 3; the mountain at the horizon is called "Bischlingsberg" (Sailauf, 375 m).

Besides its location right next to the major highway A3 (which between Goldbach and Hösbach has been hidden under a Noise barrier to reduce noise pollution), Hösbach is also located on the Bundesstrasse 26. Moreover, the municipal territory is also crossed by the Main–Spessart railway with a station at Hösbach-Bahnhof.

== Education ==
Hösbach is a seat of the school centre of the Aschaffenburg district, which comprises the following, nearby schools:

- Astrid-Lindgren-Grundschule primary school
- Mittelschule (M-Klasse)
- Staatliche Realschule Hösbach
- Hanns-Seidel-Gymnasium
- Pestalozzischule (school for those with learning problems)
- Dr. Albert-Liebmann-Schule (school for speech therapy)

The primary schools in Rottenberg and Winzenhohl are also connected.

Near the school centre, there are many sport facilities and halls, as well as an indoor swimming pool, which is also used for sport instruction. The Hanns-Seidel-Gymnasium and Realschule (An der Maas) building complex also contains the district library. There is additionally an outdoor swimming pool in the constituent municipality of Rottenberg.

== Notable people ==
- Willigis Jäger (1925-2020), Benedictine friar, mystic and Zenmaster
- Peter Schorowsky (b. 15 June 1964 in Hösbach), drummer for the band Böhse Onkelz
- Stephan Weidner (b. 29 May 1963 in Alsfeld), singer, songwriter and bassist for the band Böhse Onkelz
- Kevin Russell (b. 12 January 1964 in Hamburg), singer for the band Böhse Onkelz
