= Aschaff =

River in Germany

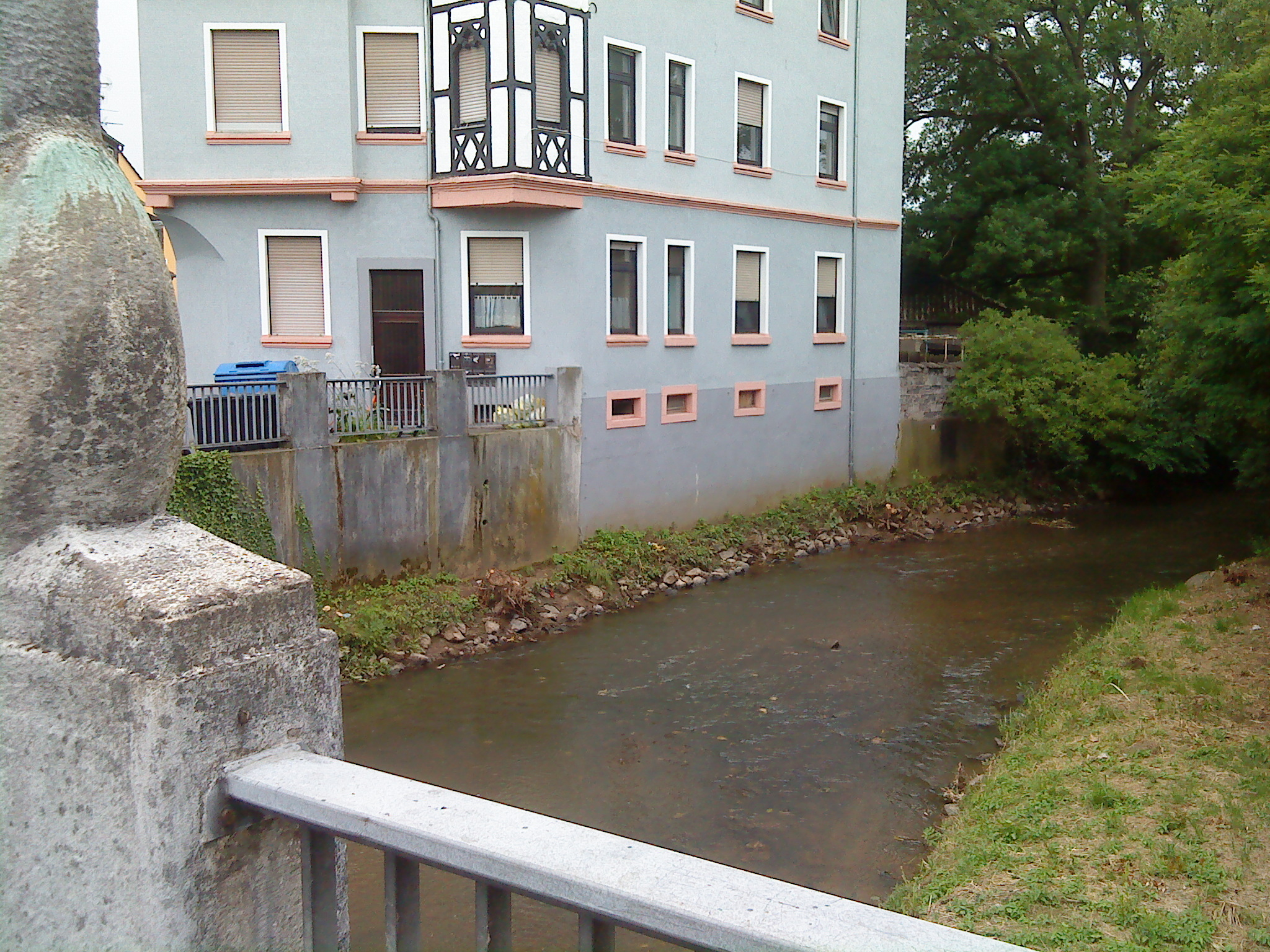
- The Aschaff in Aschaffenburg

- Location of mouth in Bavaria

Location
- Country: Germany
- State: Bavaria
- Reference no.: DE: 24754

Physical characteristics
- Source
  - location: near Waldaschaff
  - coordinates: 49°56′44″N 9°20′01″E
- Mouth
  - location: near Mainaschaff in the Main
  - coordinates: 49°58′28″N 9°06′18″E
- Length: 22.4 km (13.9 mi)
- Basin size: 166.6 km^{2} (64.3 sq mi)
- Discharge
  - average: 1.35 m^{3}/s

Basin features
- Progression: Main→ Rhine→ North Sea

The Aschaff (German pronunciation: [aˈʃaf]; in its uppermost course: Kleinaschaff) is a river in the northern Spessart in Bavaria, Germany.

It is a right tributary of the Main and is 22.4 km (13.9 mi) long. It begins at the Aschaffquelle near Waldaschaff. Loosely translated the name Aschaff means "ash water". The largest tributary is the Laufach. The river flows mostly parallel to the Bundesautobahn 3 (motorway). For the construction of the noise barrier there, the river bed was moved and straightened.

Now the Aschaff flows in the city of Aschaffenburg. It flows through the districts Damm and Strietwald. In Mainaschaff near the city limits of Aschaffenburg the Aschaff empties into the Main.

== Tributaries ==
Tributaries from source to mouth:

Left

- Bessenbach
- Nonnenbach
- Klingengraben
- Röderbach

Right

- Autenbach
- Gogelgraben
- Laufach
- Güntersbach
- Hösbach
- Goldbach
- Klingenbach
- Glattbach
- Lohmgraben

== See also ==
- List of rivers of Bavaria
