= Breitenbrunner Bach =

River in Germany

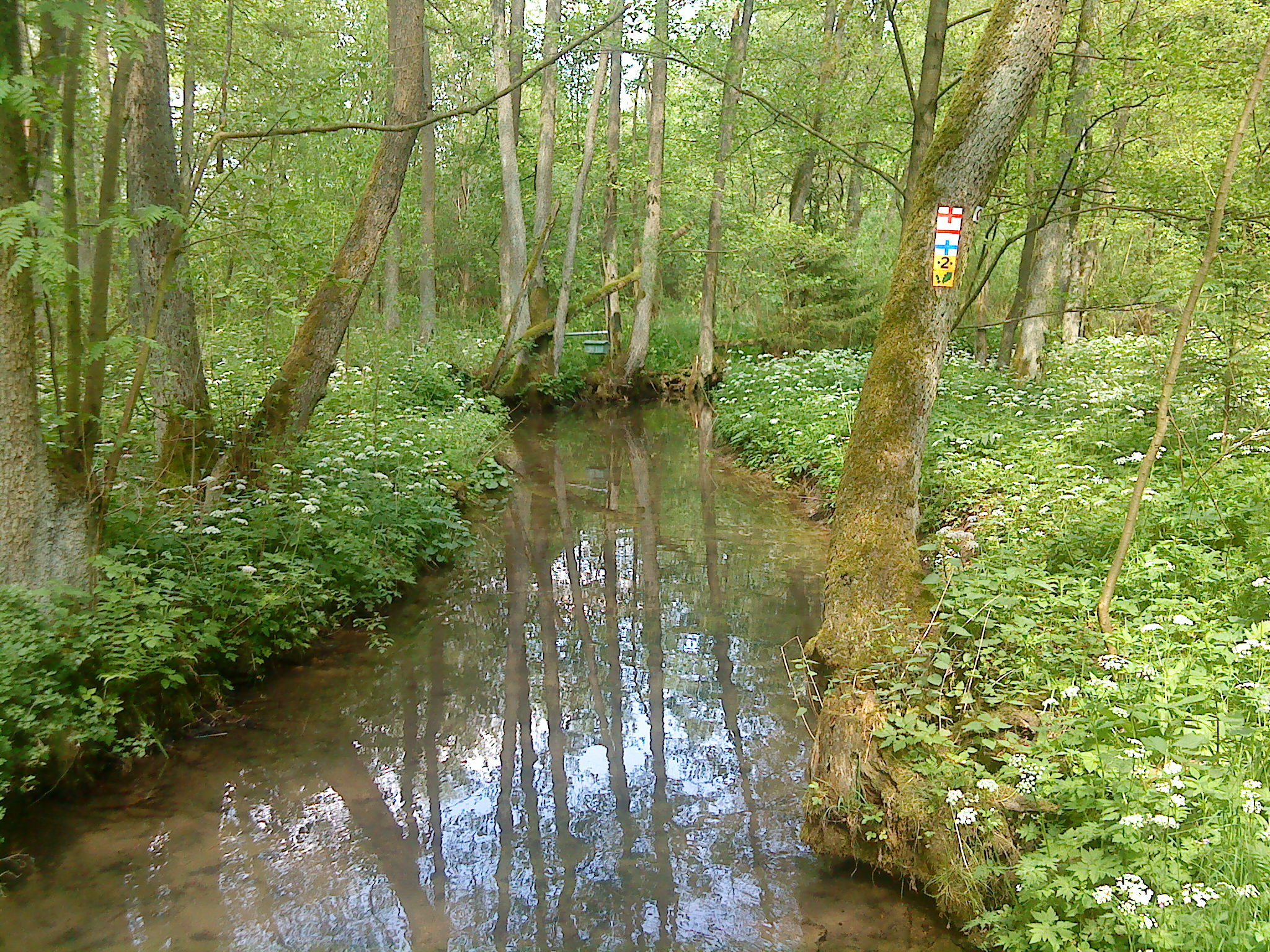
- The Breitenbrunner Bach at the Sieben Quellen

Location
- Country: Germany
- State: Bavaria

Physical characteristics
- Mouth
  - location: Rosenbach
  - coordinates: 49.4897°N 11.7651°E
- Length: 9.1 km (5.7 mi)

Basin features
- Progression: Rosenbach→ Vils→ Naab→ Danube→ Black Sea

Breitenbrunner Bach is a river of Bavaria, Germany. It flows into the Rosenbach in Sulzbach-Rosenberg.

== See also ==
- List of rivers of Bavaria
