= Altdorf railway station =

Altdorf railway station may refer to:

- Altdorf (b Nürnberg) railway station, on the Nuremberg S-Bahn in the German state of Bavaria
- Altdorf (Uri) railway station, on the Gotthard railway in the Swiss canton of Uri
- Altdorf West (b Nürnberg) railway station, also on the Nuremberg S-Bahn in the German state of Bavaria

== See also ==
- Altendorf railway station, on the Lake Zurich left-bank railway line in the Swiss canton of Schwyz
