= Holzheim am Forst =

- Municipality
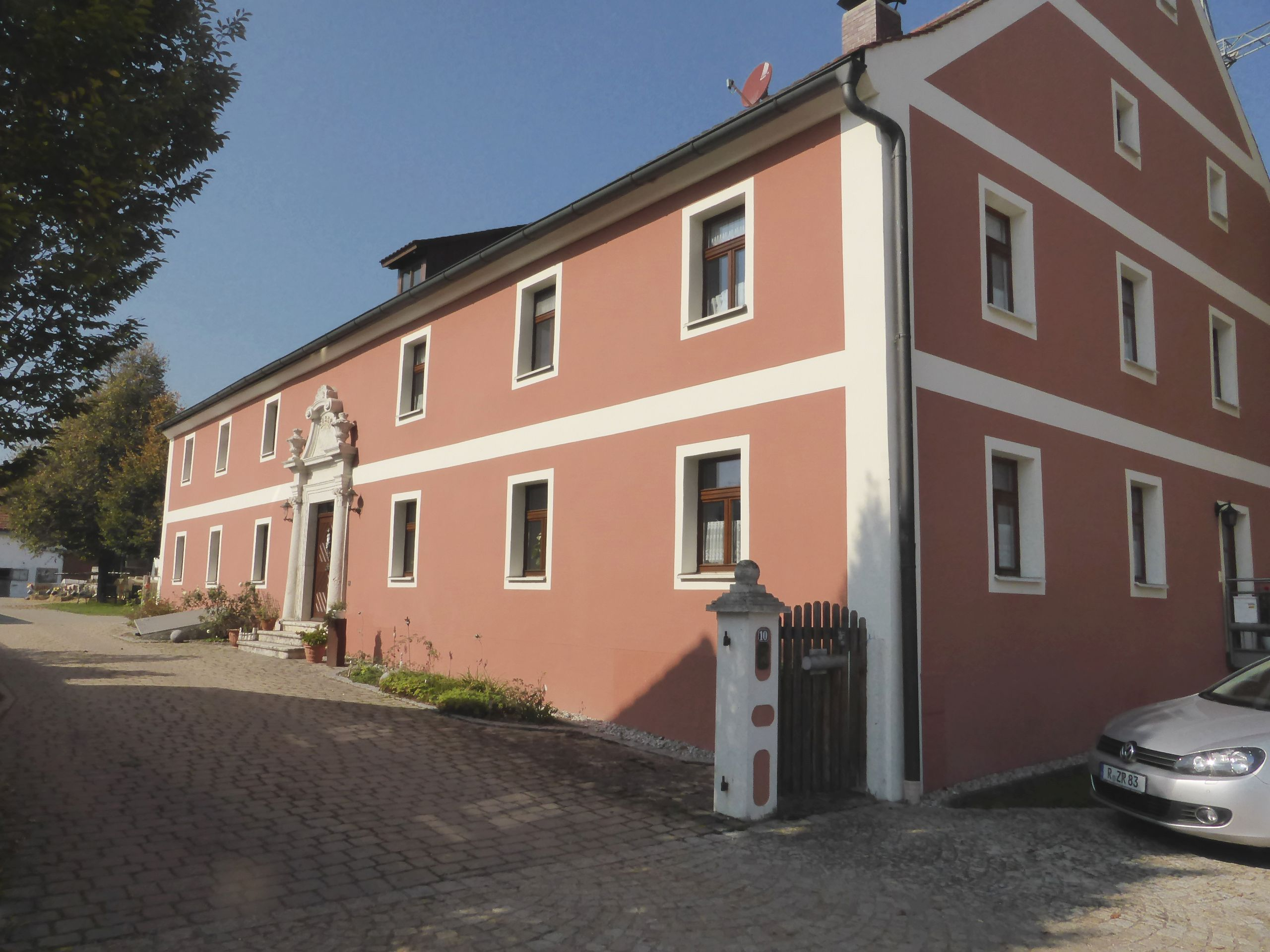
- Holzheim am Forst Castle

- Coat of arms

- Location of Holzheim am Forst within Regensburg district
- Interactive map of Holzheim am Forst
- Location within Germany Location within Bavaria
- Coordinates: 49°8′53″N 11°59′56″E
- Country: Germany
- State: Bavaria
- Admin. region: Oberpfalz
- District: Regensburg
- Municipal assoc.: Kallmünz
- Subdivisions: 13 Ortsteile

Government
  - Mayor (2020–26): Andreas Beer

Area
  - Total: 15.65 km^{2} (6.04 sq mi)
- Elevation: 380 m (1,250 ft)

Population (2025-12-31)
  - Total: 1,089
  - Density: 69.58/km^{2} (180.2/sq mi)
- Time zone: UTC+01:00 (CET)
  - Summer (DST): UTC+02:00 (CEST)
- Postal codes: 93183
- Dialling codes: 09473
- Vehicle registration: R
- Website: www.holzheim-a-forst.de

Holzheim am Forst (German pronunciation: [ˈhɔltshaɪm ʔam ˈfɔʁst], lit. 'Holzheim at the Forest') is a municipality in the district of Regensburg in Bavaria in Germany. The municipality, together with the community Duggendorf and the market town Kallmünz belong to the administrative community Kallmünz.
