= Rosenbach =

Rosenbach may refer to:

- The Rosenbach Museum & Library in Philadelphia
- Rosenbach, Görlitz, a town in eastern Saxony, Germany
- Rosenbach, Vogtland, a town in western Saxony, Germany
- Rosenbach, Austria, a village in Carinthia
- Rosenbach (White Elster), a river of Saxony, Germany, tributary of the White Elster
- Rosenbach (Vils), a river of Bavaria, Germany, tributary of the Vils
- Rosenbach (surname)
- the German name for Rožnik Hill, a hill northwest of the Ljubljana city center in Slovenia
- the German name for Rožnik, Grosuplje, a village in the Municipality of Grosuplje, central Slovenia
