= Ludersheim station =

Railway station in Germany

Ludersheim
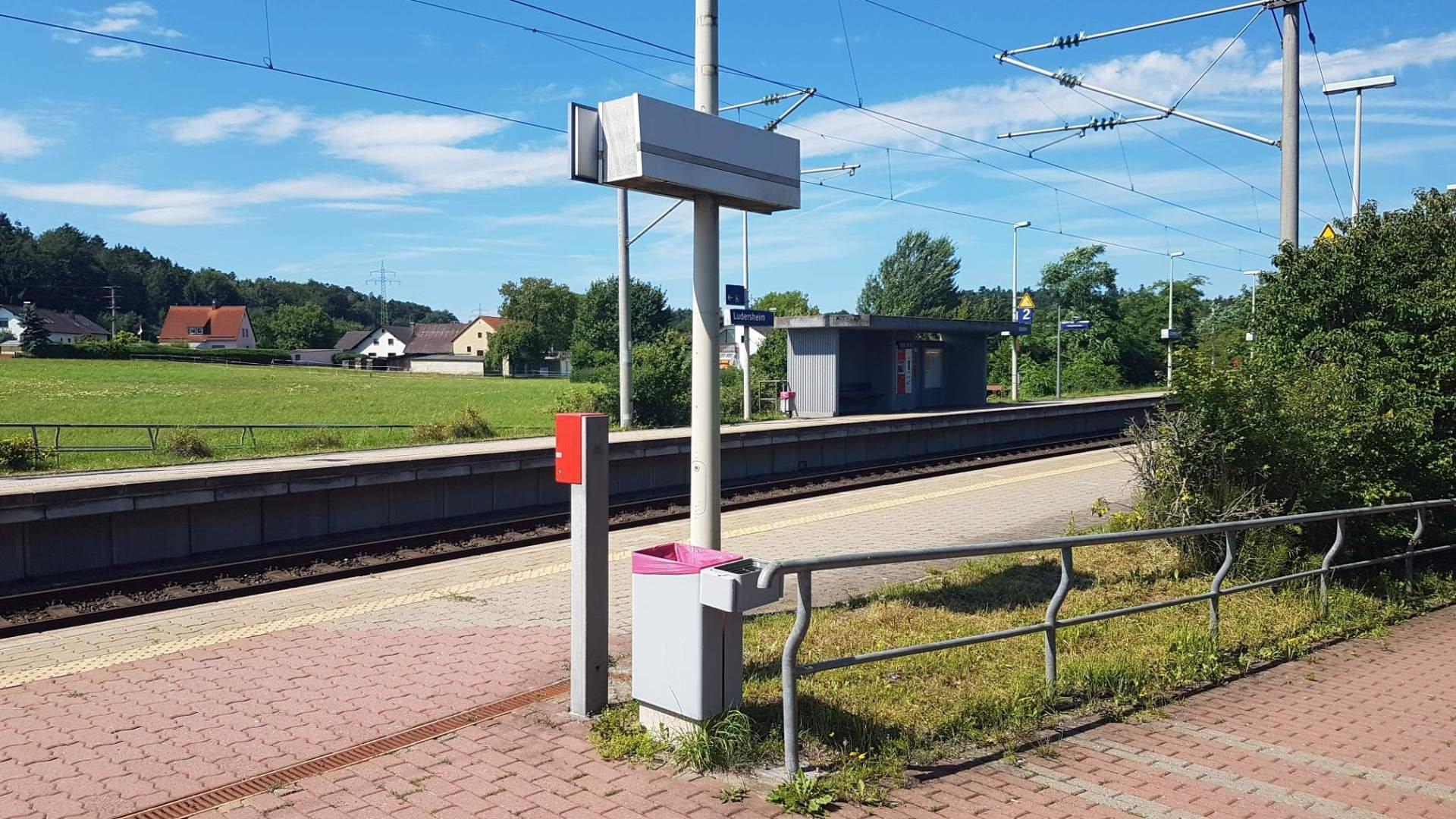
- The station platforms in 2017

General information
- Location: An der Ziegelei; Altdorf bei Nürnberg, Bavaria; Germany
- Coordinates: 49°23′32″N 11°19′26″E
- Owner: DB Netz
- Operator: DB Station&Service
- Lines: Feucht–Altdorf line (KBS 890.2)
- Distance: 9.3 km (5.8 mi) from Feucht
- Platforms: 2 side platforms
- Tracks: 2
- Train operators: DB Regio Bayern

Other information
- Station code: 3831
- DS100 code: NLHM
- IBNR: 8003762
- Category: 6
- Fare zone: VGN: 524
- Website: www.bahnhof.de

Services
Preceding station	Nuremberg S-Bahn	Following station
Winkelhaid towards Roth	S2	Altdorf West (b Nürnberg) towards Hartmannshof
Location

Ludersheim station is a railway station in the Ludersheim district of the municipality of Altdorf bei Nürnberg, located in the Nürnberger Land district in Middle Franconia, Germany. The station is on the Feucht–Altdorf line of Deutsche Bahn.
