= Kallmünz (Verwaltungsgemeinschaft) =

- Verwaltungsgemeinschaft
- Location of Kallmünz within Regensburg district
- Interactive map of Kallmünz
- Location within Germany Location within Bavaria
- Coordinates: 49°10′N 11°58′E
- Country: Germany
- State: Bavaria
- Admin. region: Upper Palatinate
- District: Regensburg
- Seat: Kallmünz
- Subdivisions: 3 municipalities

Area
  - Total: 81.71 km^{2} (31.55 sq mi)

Population (2025-12-31)
  - Total: 5,413
  - Density: 66.25/km^{2} (171.6/sq mi)
- Time zone: UTC+01:00 (CET)
  - Summer (DST): UTC+02:00 (CEST)
- Website: www.vg-kallmuenz.de

Kallmünz is a Verwaltungsgemeinschaft (municipal association) in the district of Regensburg in Bavaria, Germany. Its seat is in Kallmünz.

It consists of the following municipalities:

1. Duggendorf
2. Holzheim am Forst
3. Kallmünz
