= Altdorf (b Nürnberg) station =

Railway station in Germany

Altdorf (b Nürnberg)
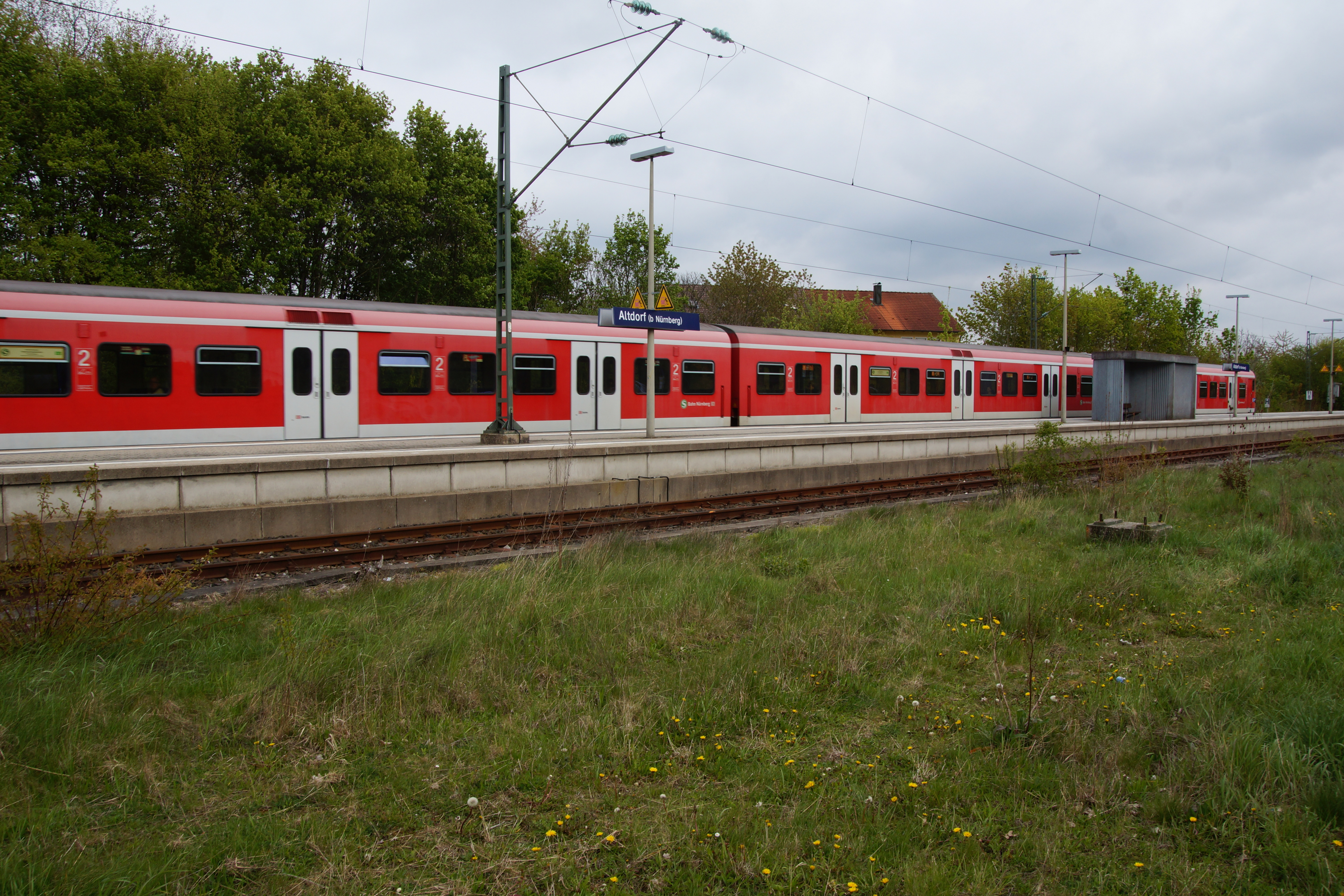
- An S-Bahn train at the station in 2017

General information
- Location: Bahnhofstraße; Altdorf bei Nürnberg, Bavaria; Germany
- Coordinates: 49°23′24″N 11°21′13″E
- Elevation: 440 m (1,440 ft)
- Owner: DB Netz
- Operator: DB Station&Service
- Lines: Feucht–Altdorf line (KBS 890.2)
- Distance: 11.6 km (7.2 mi) from Nürnberg Hauptbahnhof
- Platforms: 1 island platform
- Tracks: 2
- Train operators: DB Regio Bayern

Other information
- Station code: 75
- DS100 code: NAD
- IBNR: 8000509
- Category: 6
- Fare zone: VGN: 533
- Website: www.bahnhof.de

Services
Preceding station	Nuremberg S-Bahn	Following station
Altdorf West (b Nürnberg) towards Roth	S2	Terminus
Location

Altdorf (b Nürnberg) station is a railway station in the municipality of Altdorf bei Nürnberg, located in the Nürnberger Land district in Middle Franconia, Germany. The station is the eastern terminus of the Feucht–Altdorf line of Deutsche Bahn.
