= Lauterach (river) =

River in Germany

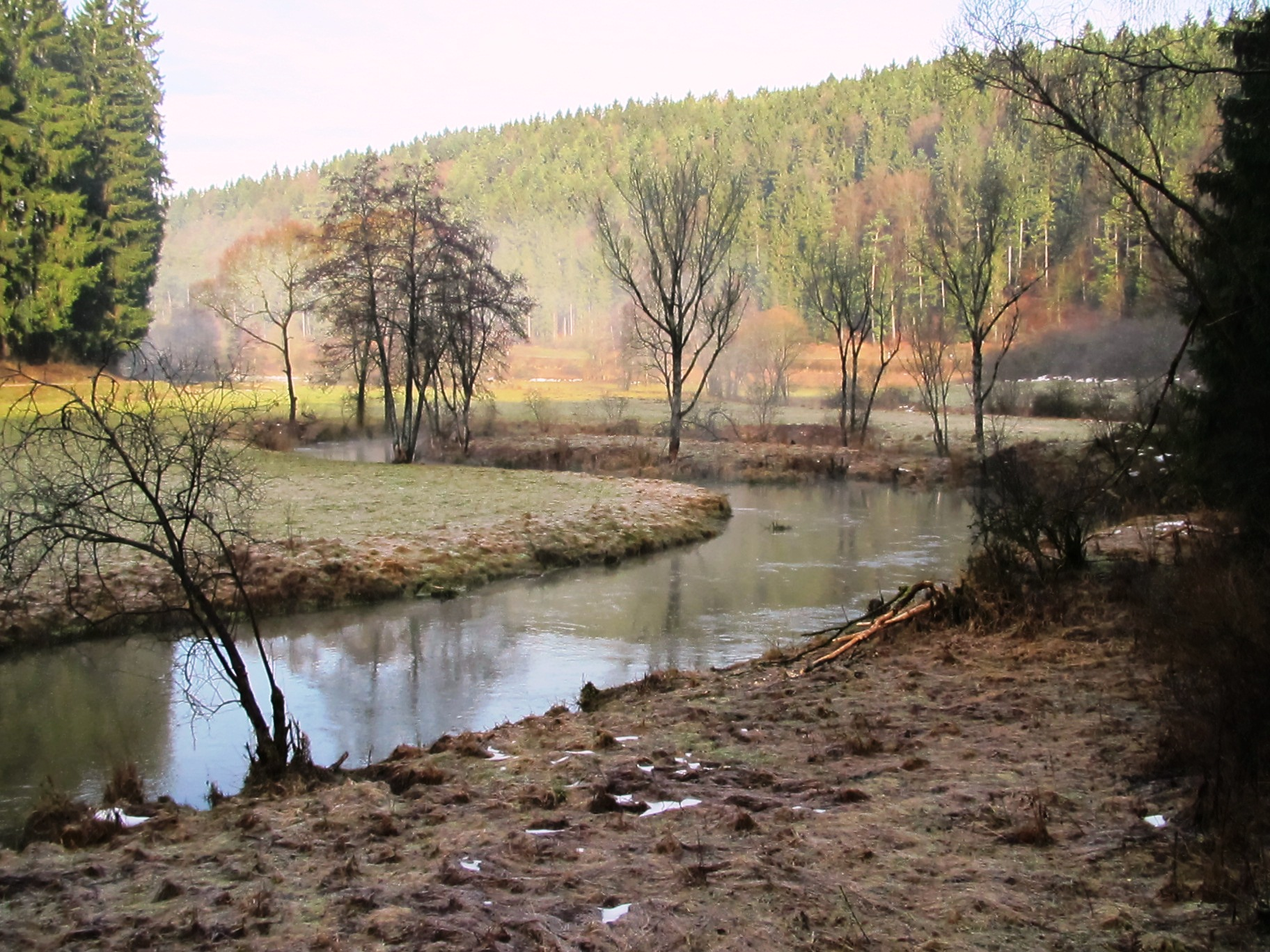
- The Lauterach between Mühlhausen and Flügelsbuch

Location
- Country: Germany
- State: Bavaria

Physical characteristics
- Source
  - location: Lauterhofen
- Mouth
  - location: Vils in Schmidmühlen
  - coordinates: 49.2649°N 11.9252°E
- Length: 34.7 km (21.6 mi)
- Basin size: 327 km^{2} (126 sq mi)

Basin features
- Progression: Vils→ Naab→ Danube→ Black Sea

The Lauterach (German pronunciation: [ˈlaʊtəʁax]) is a river in Bavaria, Germany. It flows into the Vils in Schmidmühlen.

== See also ==
- List of rivers of Bavaria
