= Albert Reich =

German painter, graphic designer, draftsman and illustrator

Albert Reich's signature

Albert Reich (January 14, 1881 – April 12, 1942) was a German painter, graphic designer, draftsman and illustrator. During the First World War, he was attached as a war painter to the Alpenkorps. After the war, he joined the Nazi Party and contributed to its propaganda with paintings.

== Early life ==
Albert Reich, was born to a shoemaker in Neumarkt in der Oberpfalz in the Kingdom of Bavaria, then part of the German Empire. He graduated from the Academy of Fine Arts of Nuremberg in 1898. In 1901–1902, he received a scholarship of 360 German marks from the Maximilian Foundation. In October 1902, he entered the Academy of Fine Arts of Munich, where he was taught by Johann Caspar Herterich, Heinrich von Zügel and Peter Halm. Herterich introduced him to Michael Laßleben, a publisher from Kallmünz in his native Upper Palatinate, for whom he worked as an illustrator from 1907. From 1911, he studied the technique of plein air painting at the school of Melchior Kern, whom he succeeded as head of the school on the eve of First World War.

On May 31, 1912, he married his student, Elisabeth (Lisbeth) Anna Karla Martha Sellschopp (1884–1958), who worked with him on the production of his albums. The couple had four daughters.

== From the First World War to the Third Reich ==
During the First World War, Albert Reich became the war painter of the Alpenkorps, a unit formed for mountain warfare which he accompanied in the Balkans Theatre during the Serbian Campaign, the Eastern Front in Romania, the Italian Front and on the Western Front. In his albums, he gives an idealized and heroic image of the war.

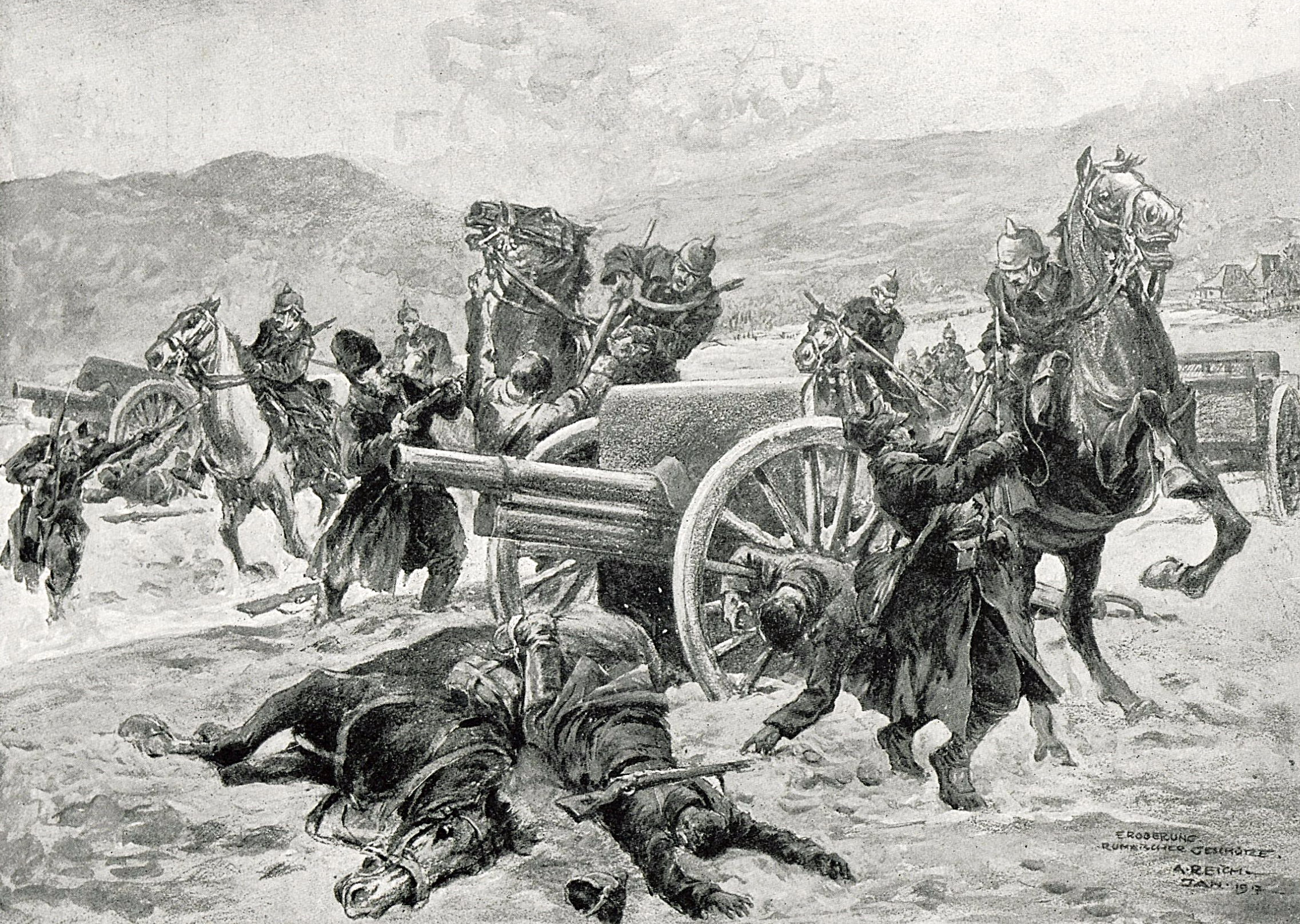
German cavalry charging against the Romanian infantry near Târgoviște, 1916-1917

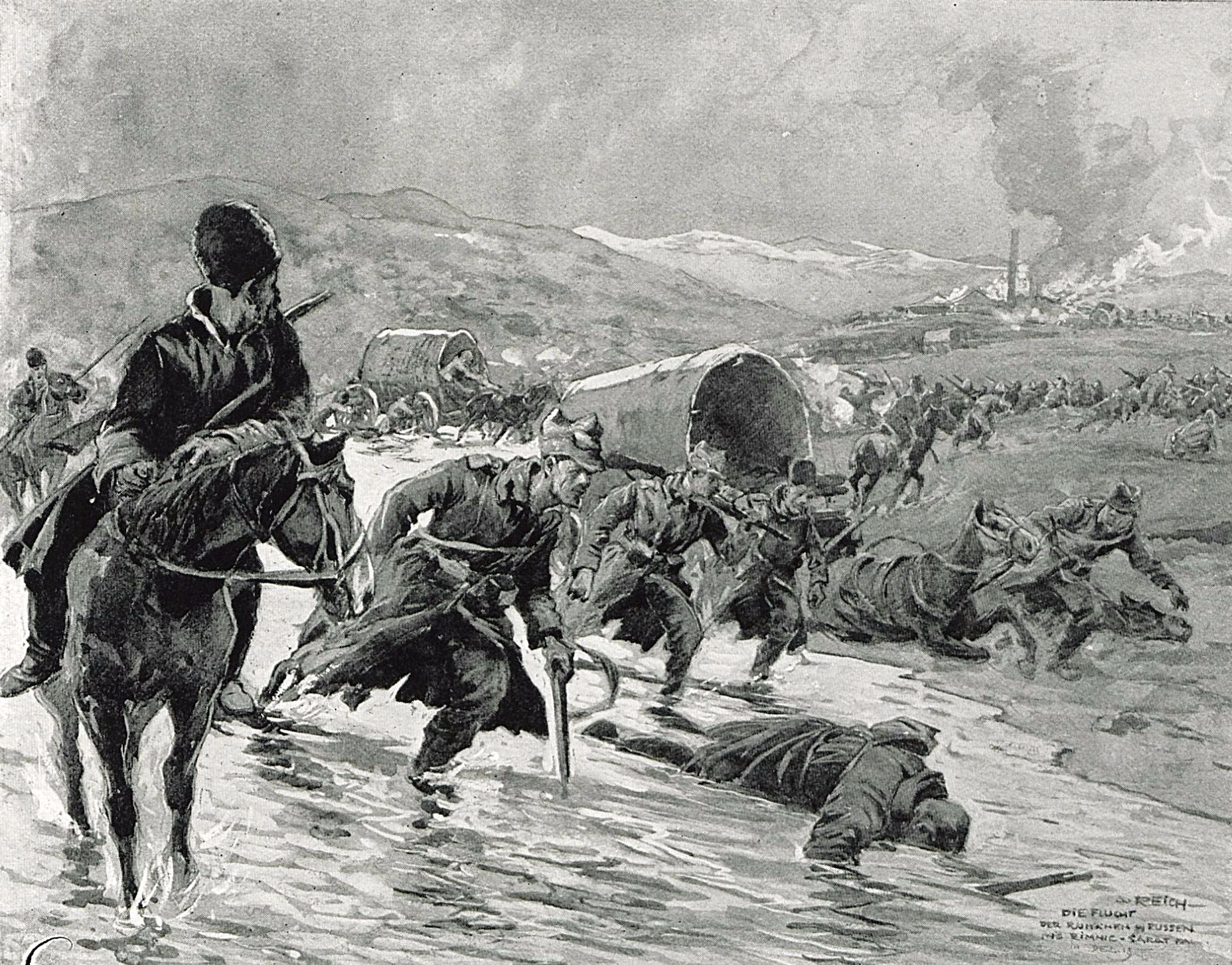
Russian and Romanian troops in retreat after a battle in Râmnicu Sărat, 1916

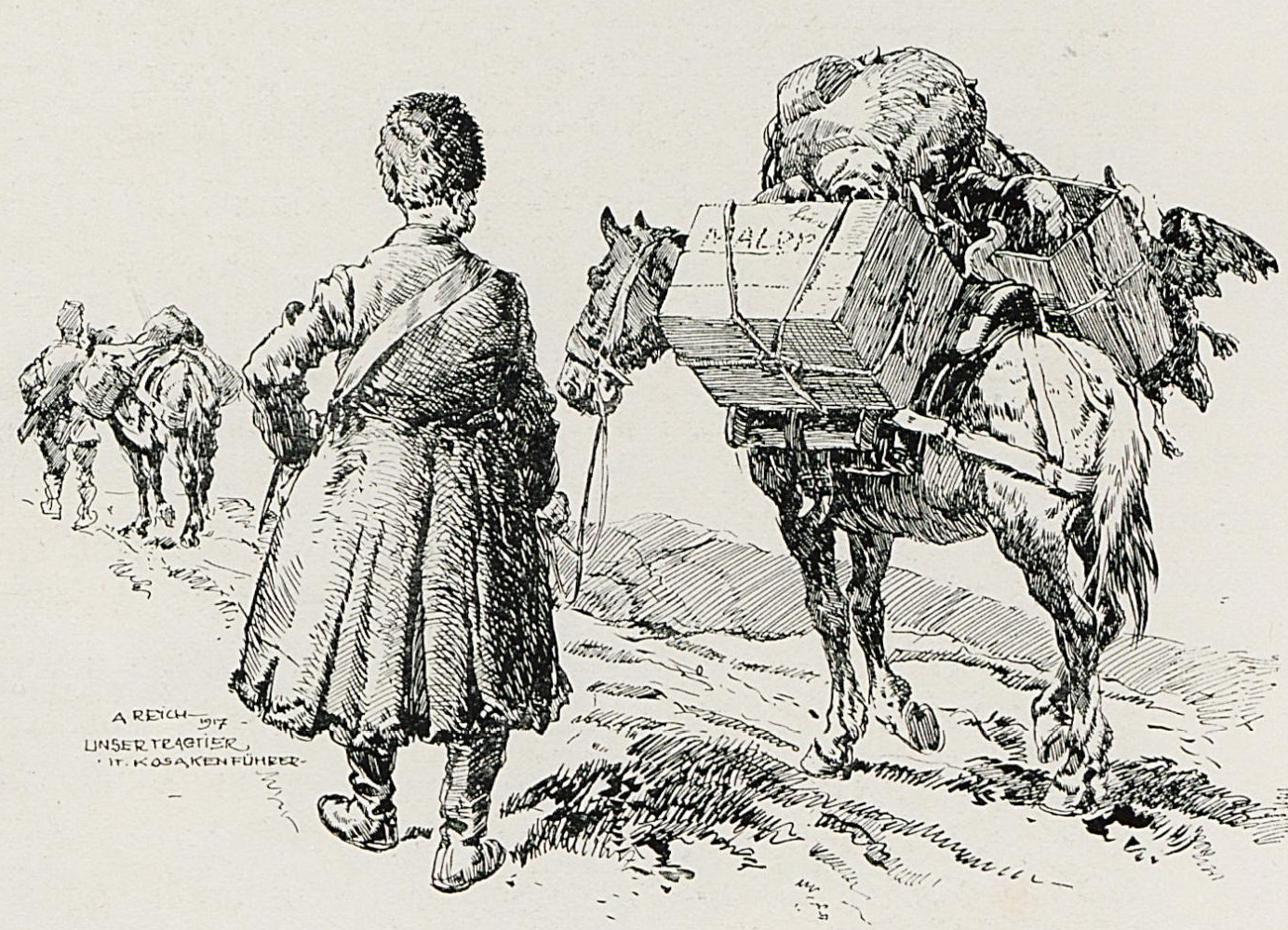
Pack mules of the Alpenkorps led by a Cossack prisoner in Râmnicu Sărat, 1916

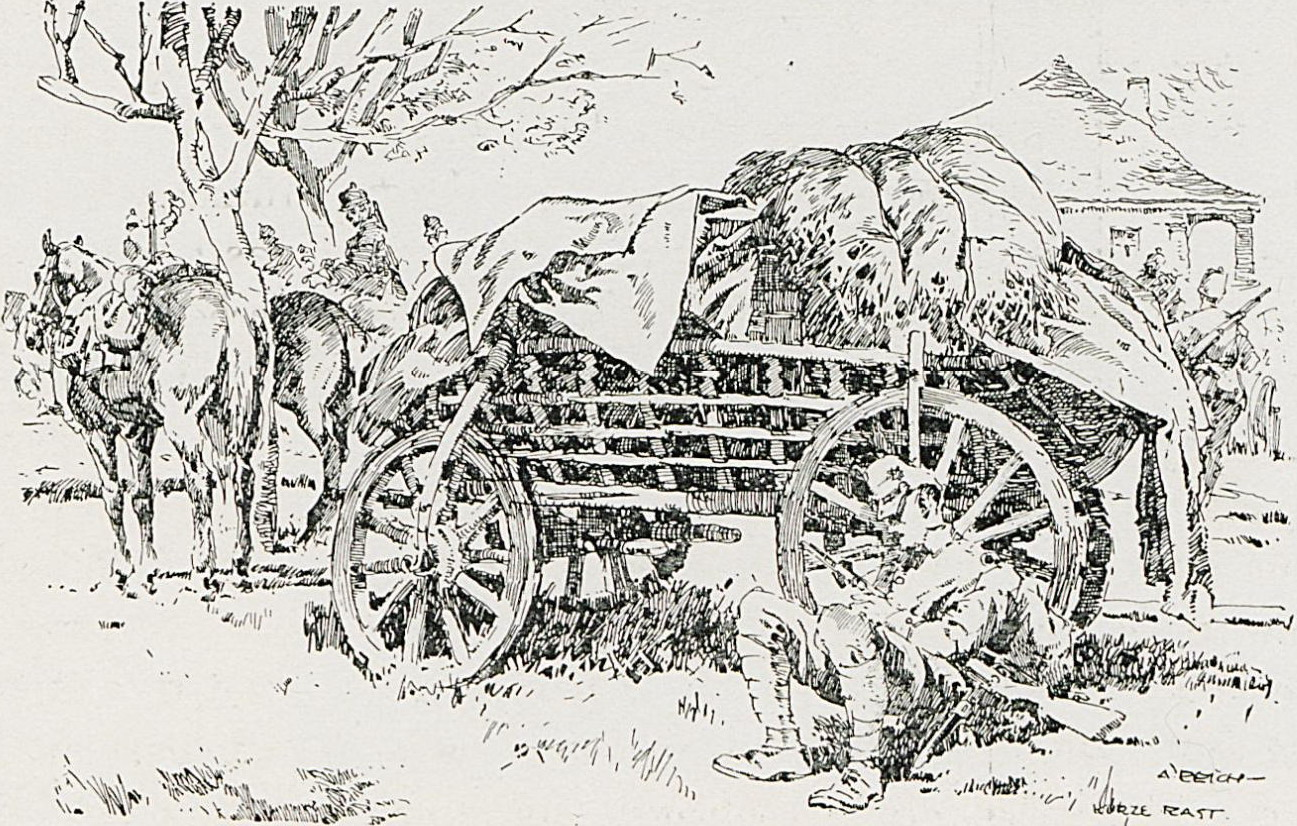
Soldiers in front of a farm in Romania, 1916-1917

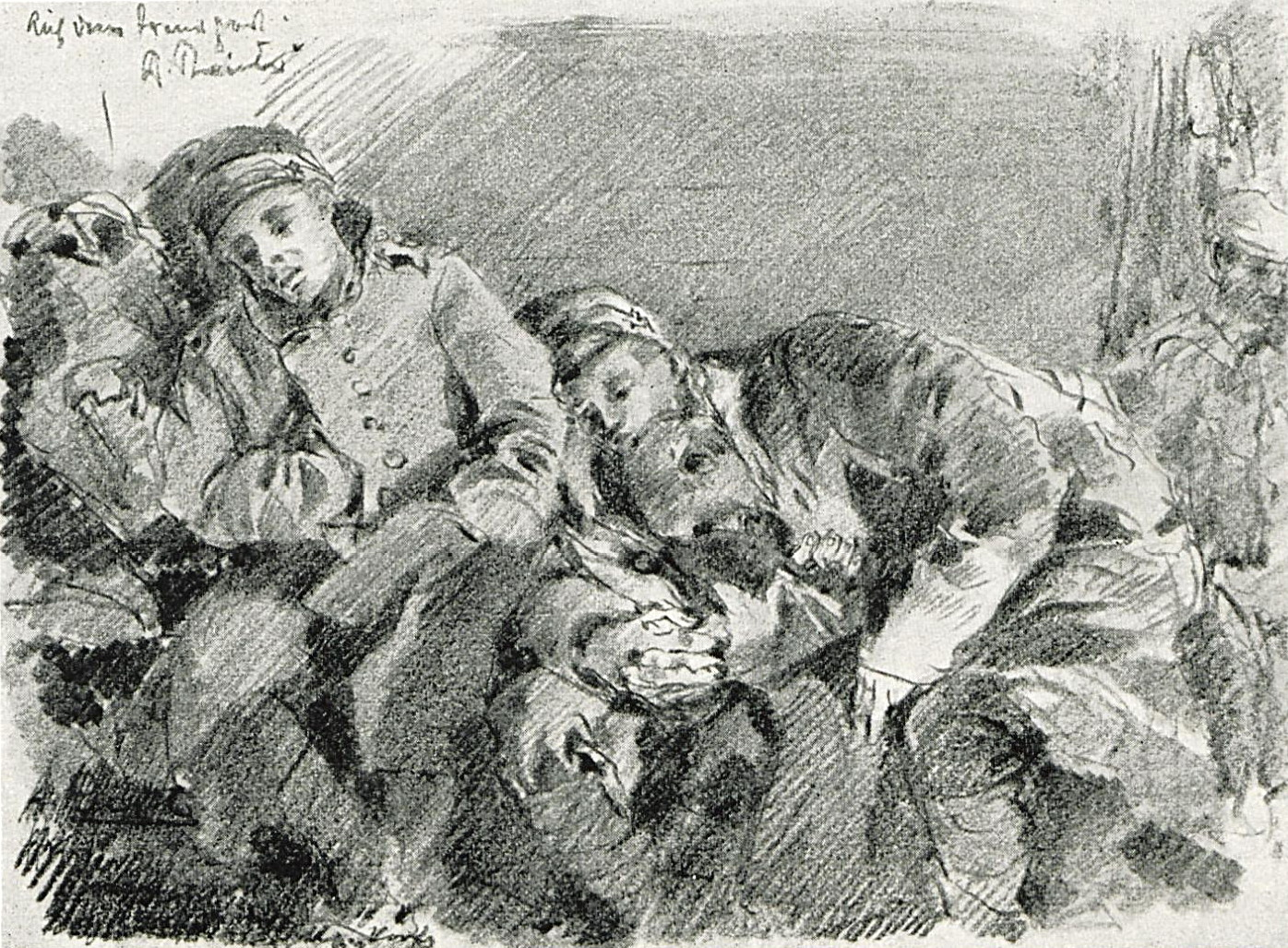
Wagon transporting German soldiers, 1916-1917

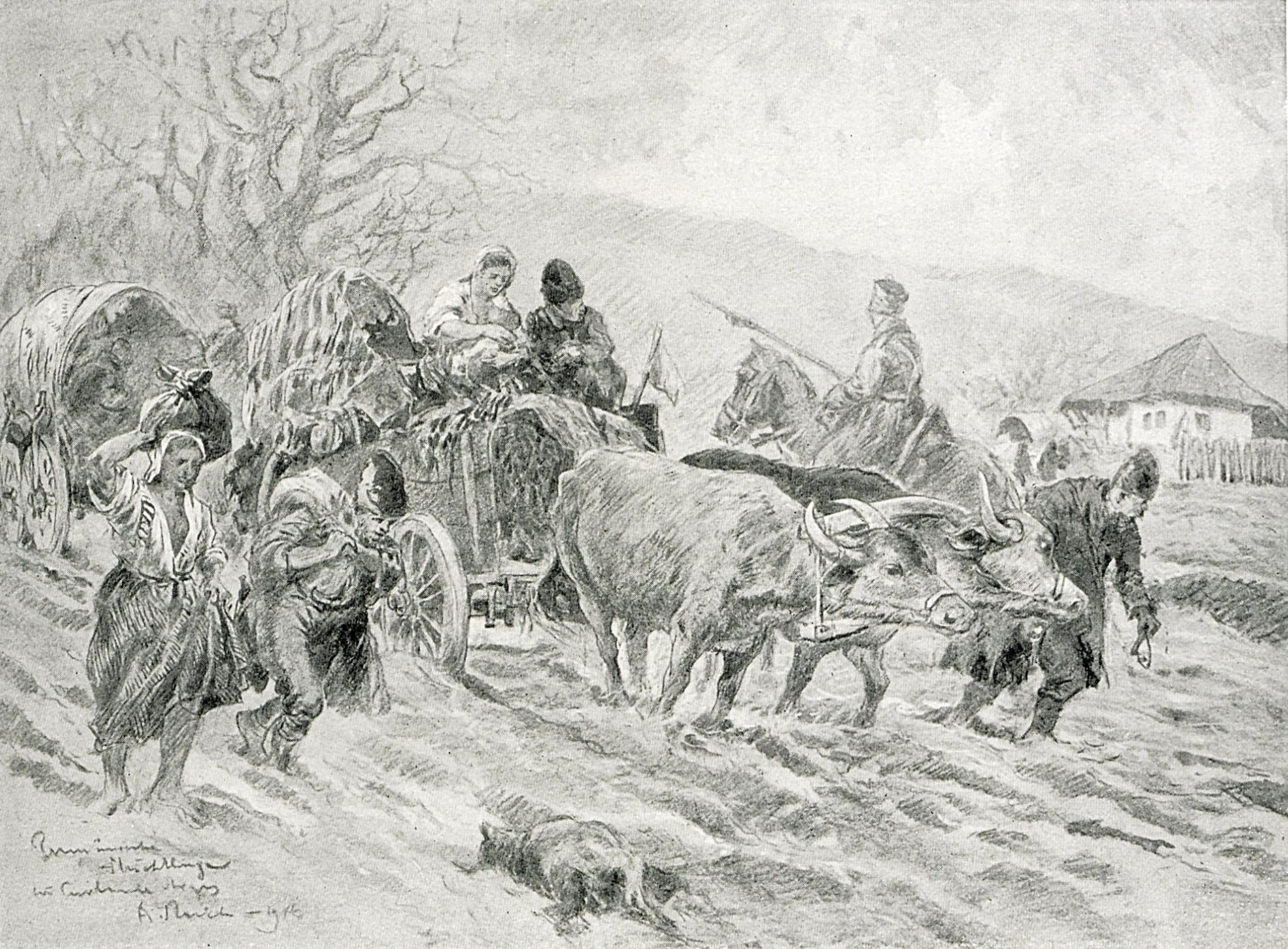
Flight of Romanian civilians, 1916-1917

After the war, he designed two war memorials: in 1920 for the Mariä Opferung church in Duggendorf, and in 1922–1923 for the market square in Kallmünz.

Reich was an early supporter and member of the Nazi Party. With his friend Dietrich Eckart, he created the cover design for the first edition of Adolf Hitler's autobiographical manifesto: Mein Kampf. In 1930, he founded a cell of the Nazi Party in the district of Harlaching in Munich. He put his talent as an illustrator at the service of the Nazi movement. After Hitler took power in 1933, he contributed to the regime's militarist propaganda. The Nazi newspaper Völkischer Beobachter, to which he was linked through his friend Christian Weber, celebrated him as "arguably the first graphic artist who joined the nascent National Socialist movement with pencil and brush".

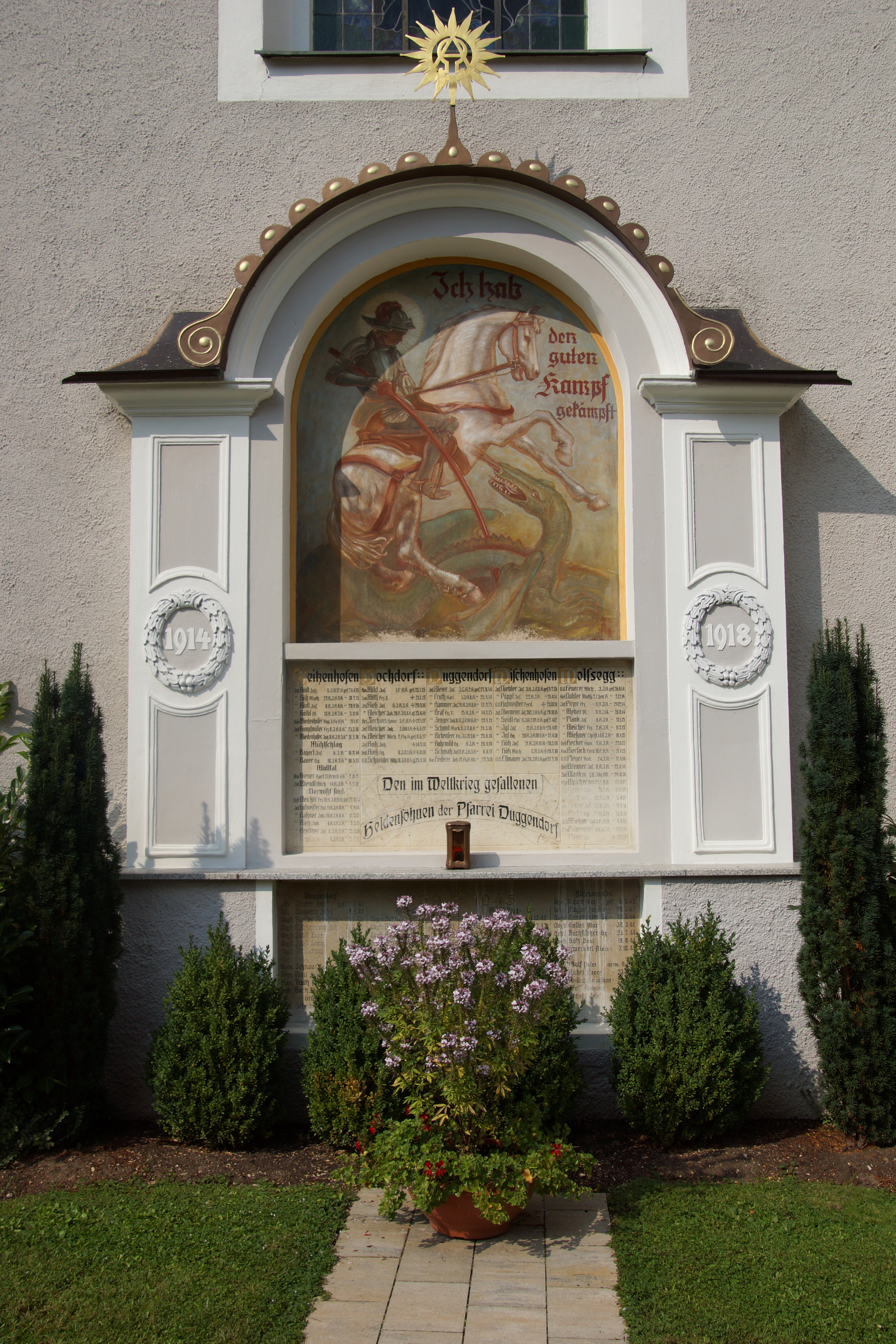
Memorial to the First World War in the parish church of the Assumption in Duggendorf, designed by Albert Reich in 1920

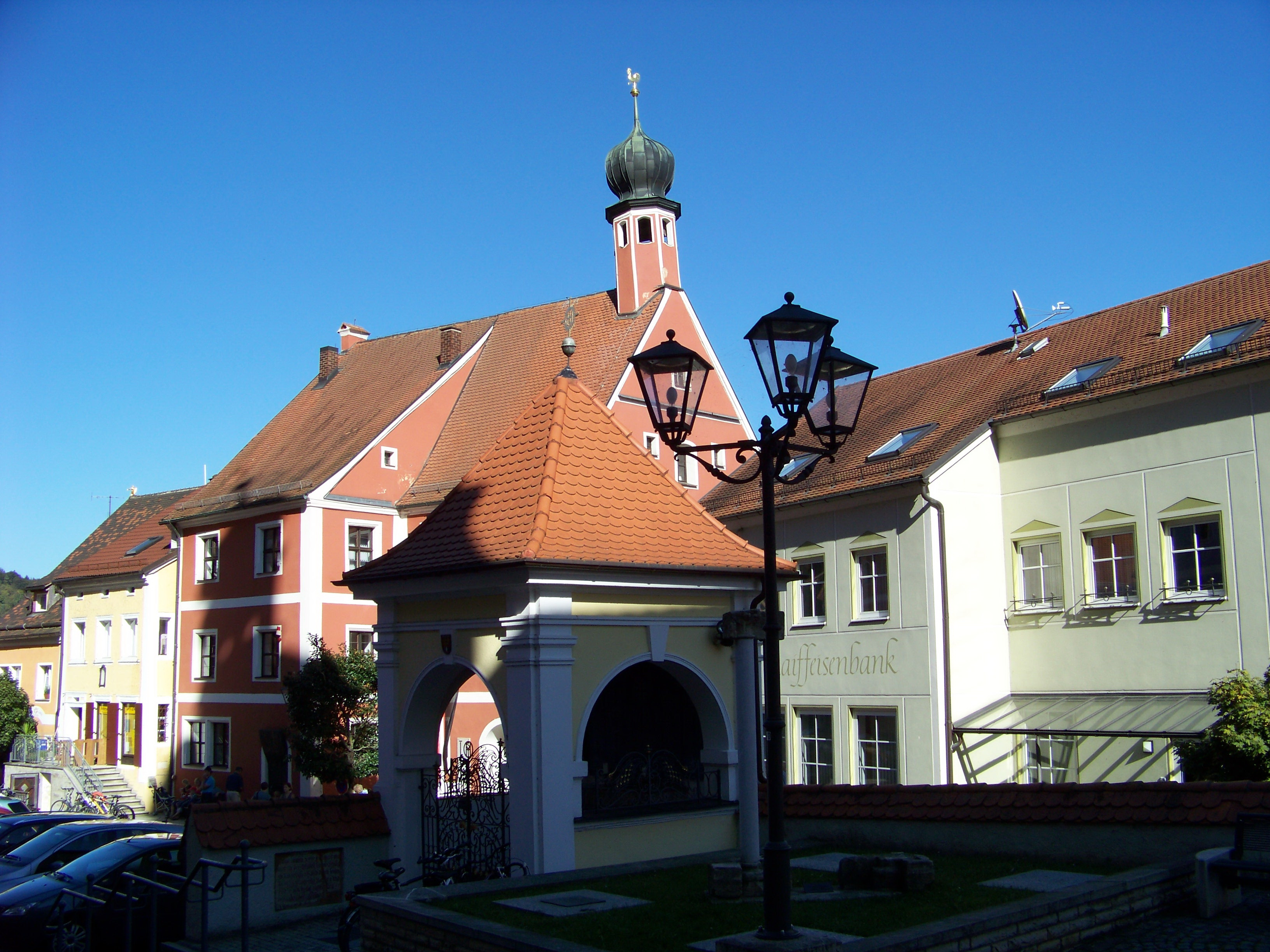
Memorial to the First World War on the Marktplatz (Market Square) in the heart of Kallmünz, designed by Albert Reich in 1922–23

Albert Reich was a personal friend of Hitler. His album Aus Adolf Hitlers Heimat ("From Adolf Hitler's Homeland"), published in 1933, is the only work published under the Nazi regime that mentions the Führer's family of origin. Alongside picturesque landscapes of Upper Austria, he shows several portraits of members of Hitler's maternal family. Such mentions were strictly prohibited thereafter.

In 1935, he was commissioned by the cultural service of the Reichsgau (districts of Nazi Germany) to stage the 125th Oktoberfest in Munich under the slogan "Stolze Stadt – Glückliches Land" ("Proud City – Happy Country"). In 1936, he supervised the staging of the Braunes Band von Deutschland ("Brown Band of Germany"), a horse show in Nazi Party colors for the 500th anniversary of the Munich Hippodrome.

In March 1942, he was appointed to the Amt Rosenberg (Rosenberg Office), a department of cultural affairs patronized by the Nazi ideologue Alfred Rosenberg. When he died unexpectedly on April 12, 1942, in Munich at the age of 61, Hitler not only sent a wreath to his funeral, but also posthumously appointed him a professor. The Völkischer Beobachter wrote cryptically for his obituary, that Reich had "succumbed to a treacherous disease". He is buried in the military square of the Munich Waldfriedhof (plot 63, grave 24).

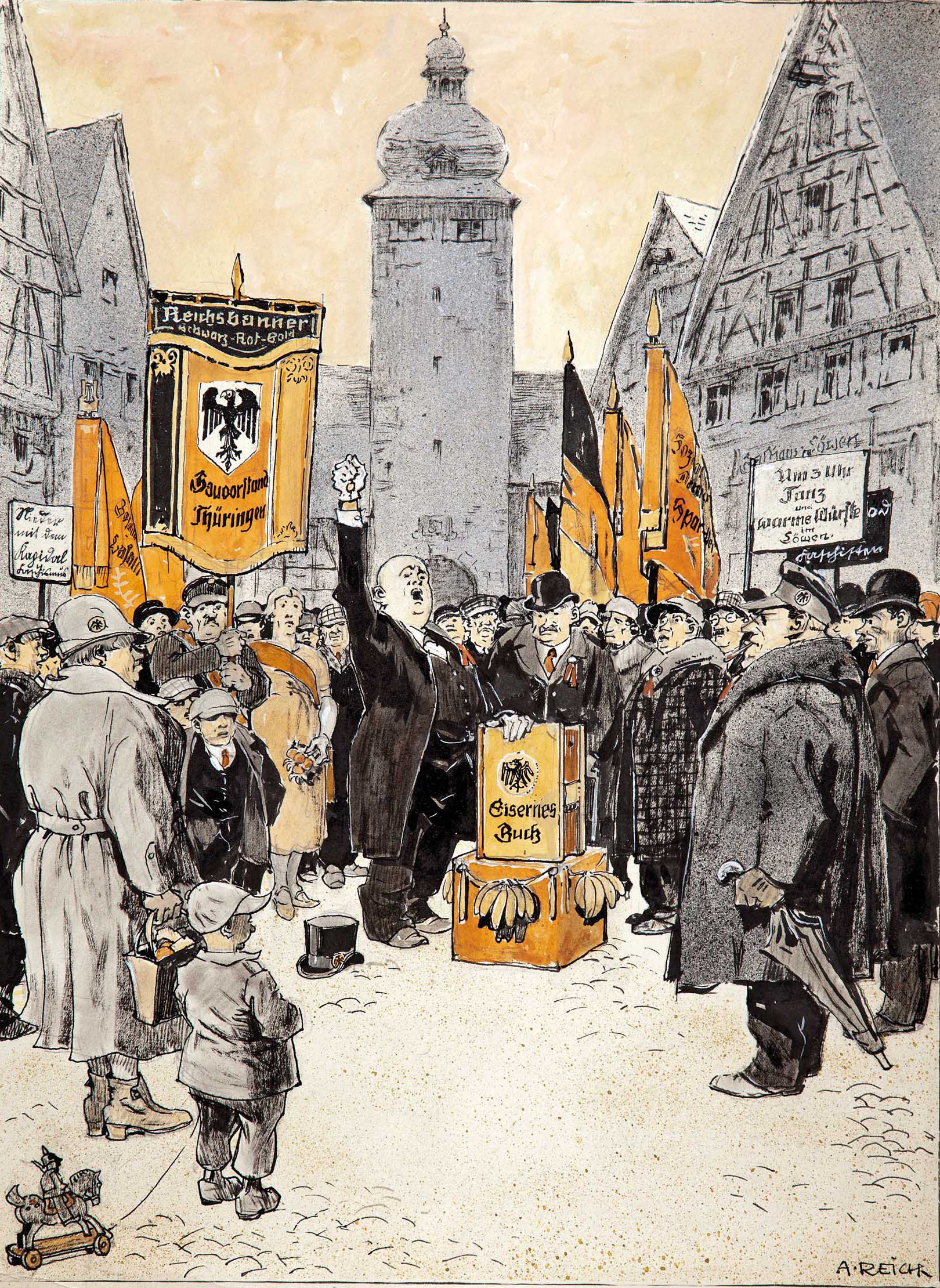
Eiserne Front-Feier (Iron Front Celebration), 1931

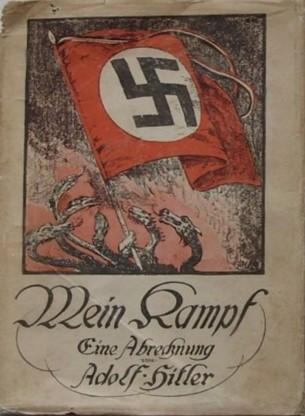
Cover design for Mein Kampf

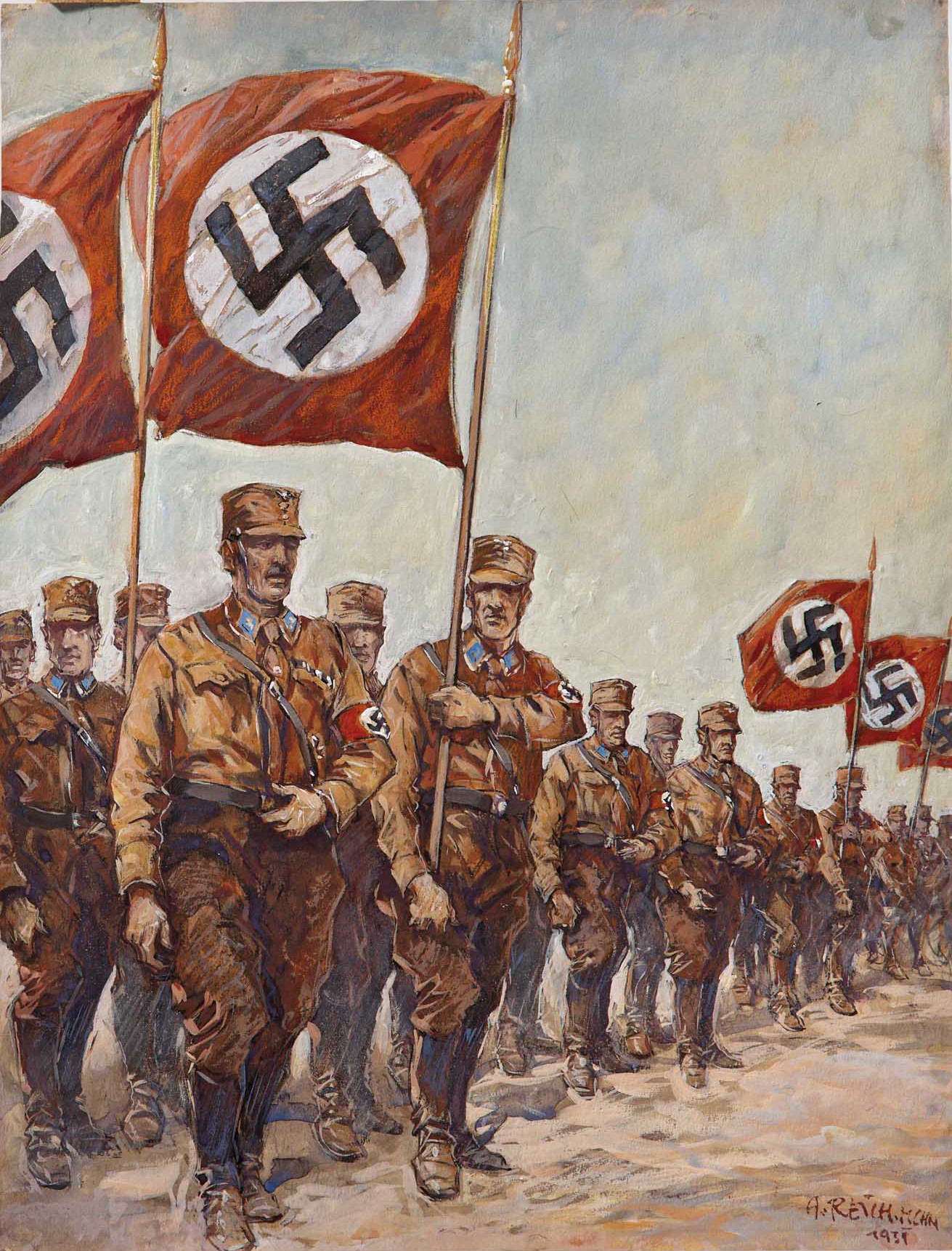
Die lebendige Front (The living Front), 1931

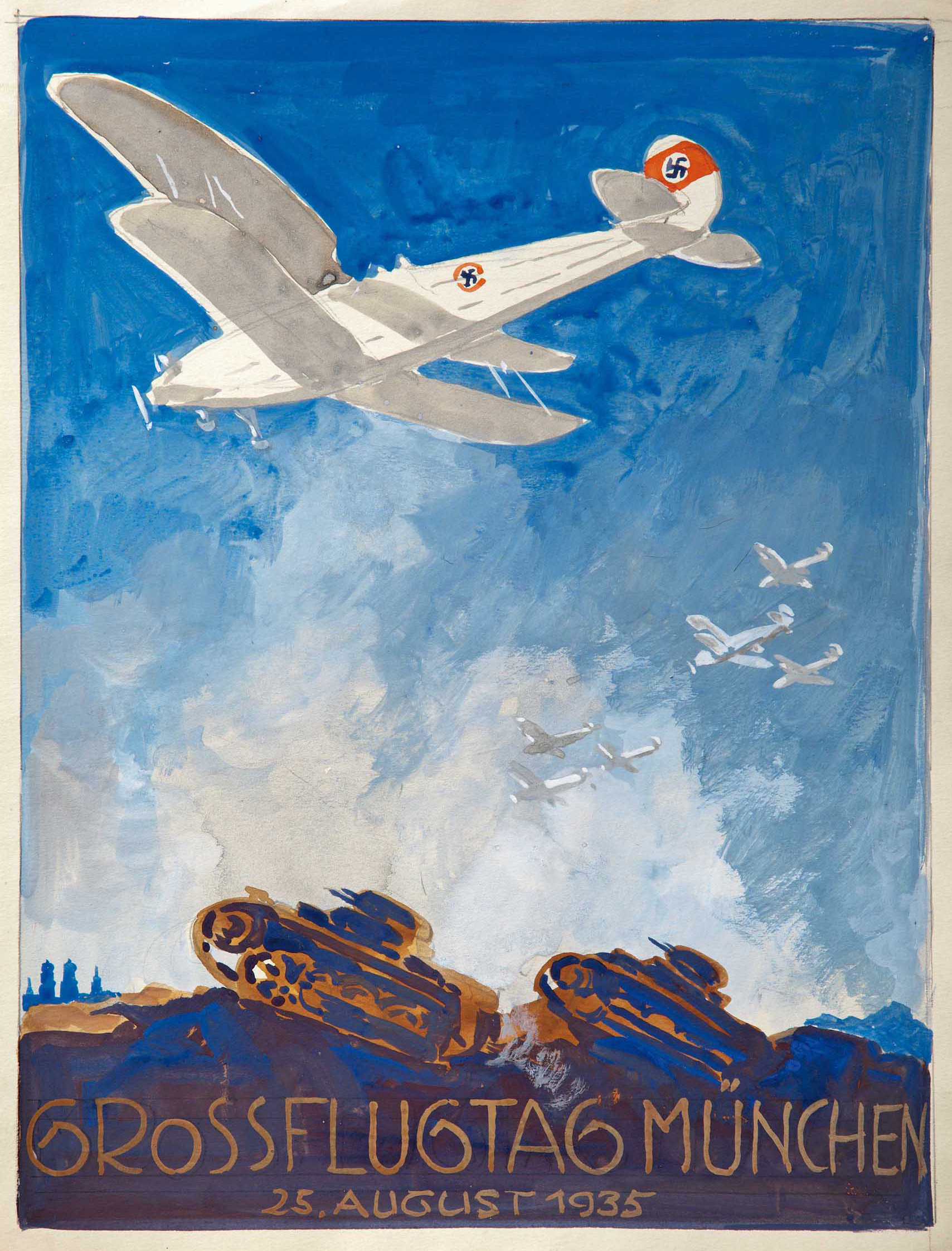
Poster for the Aviation Day in Munich, 1935

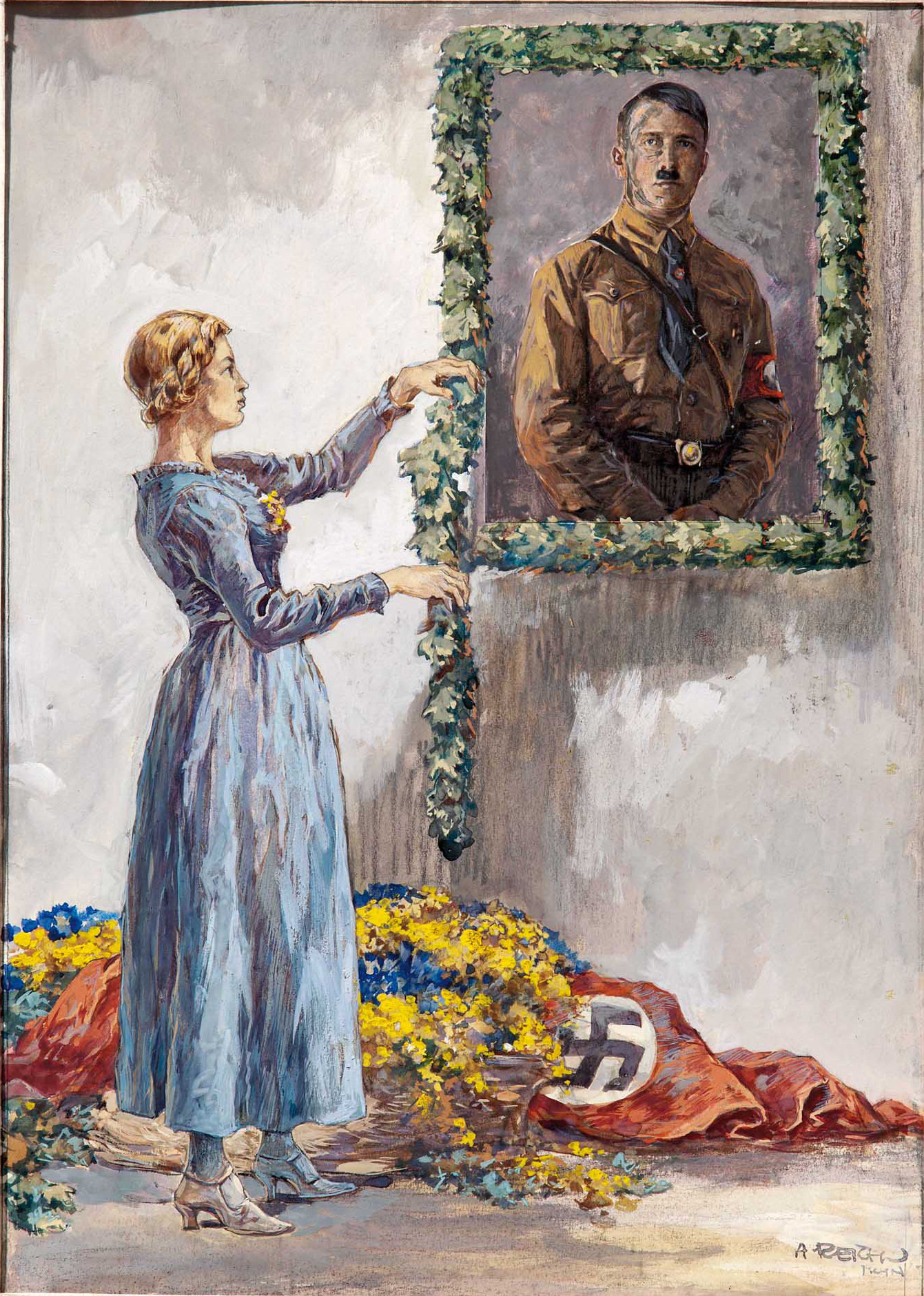
Painting of Hitler

== Posthumously ==
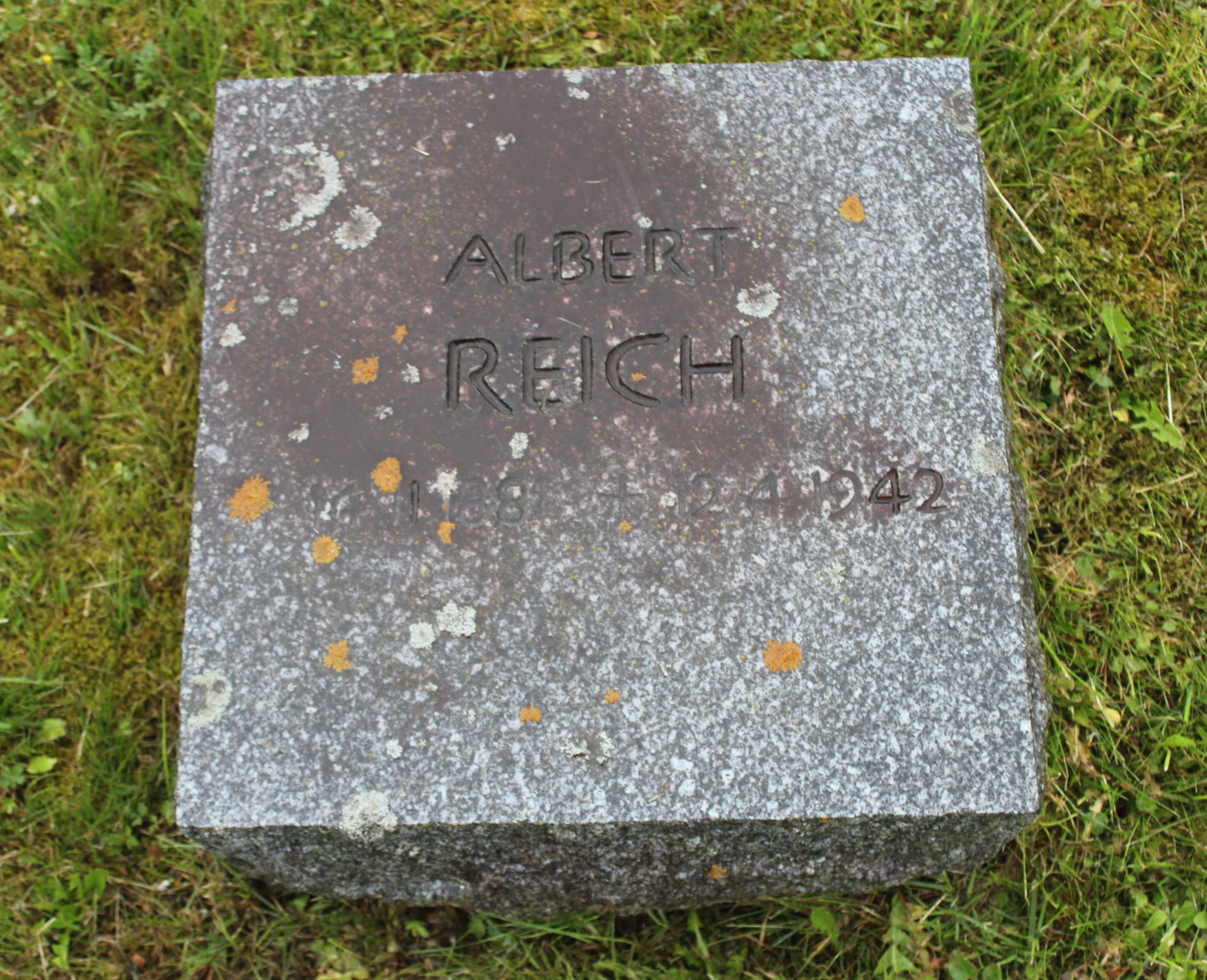
Grave of Albert Reich in the Munich Waldfriedhof

Around the year 2000, the memory of Albert Reich was the subject of disputes because of his adherence to Nazism. A street that was named after him in his hometown, Neumarkt in der Oberpfalz, was renamed in 2011. It was renamed after Josef Geiß, a local Social Democratic Party of Germany activist who was deported to Dachau concentration camp in 1933. Geiß survived his imprisonment and the Nazi regime.
