= Schmidmühlen =

- Municipality
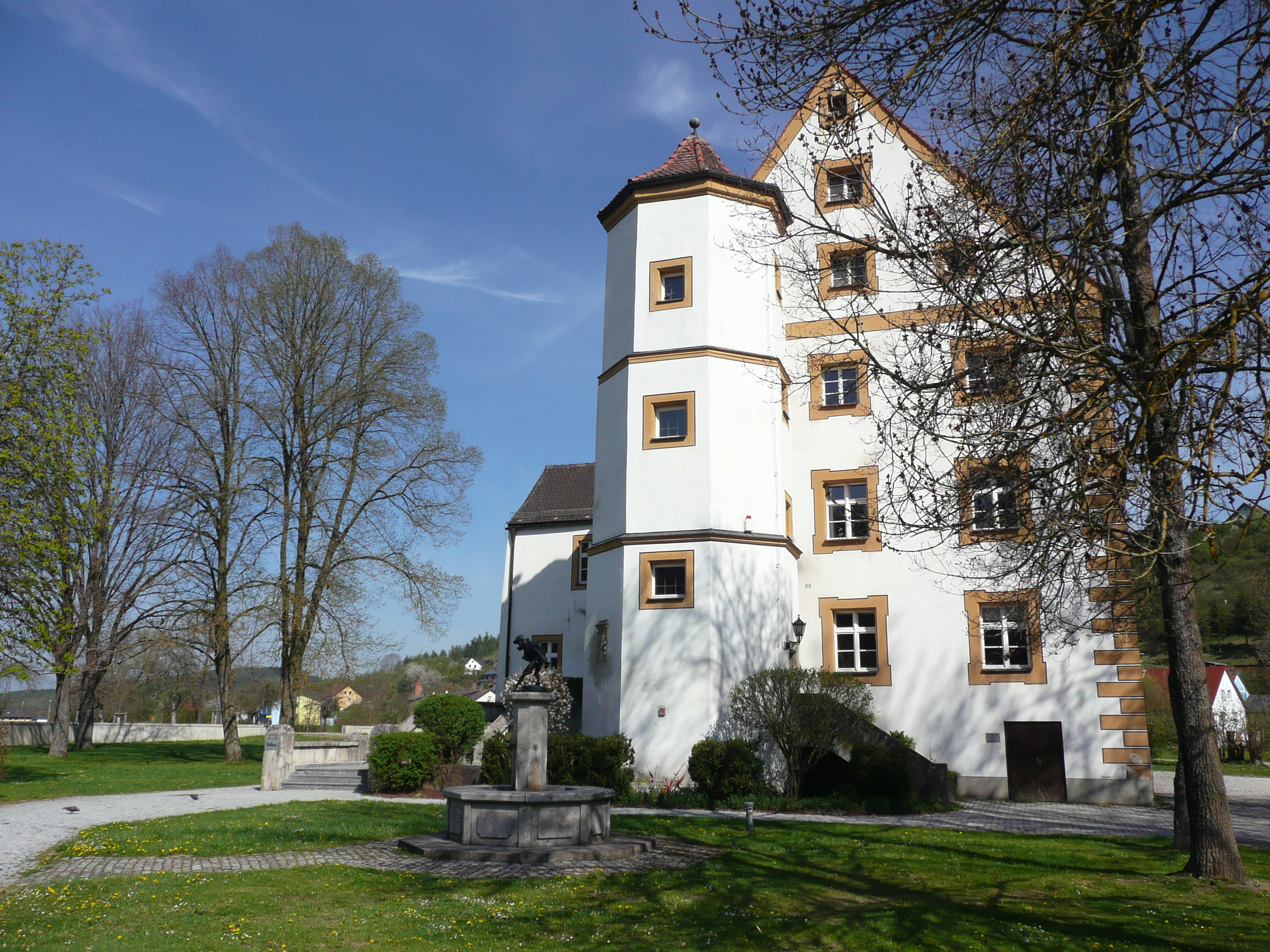
- Upper Castle

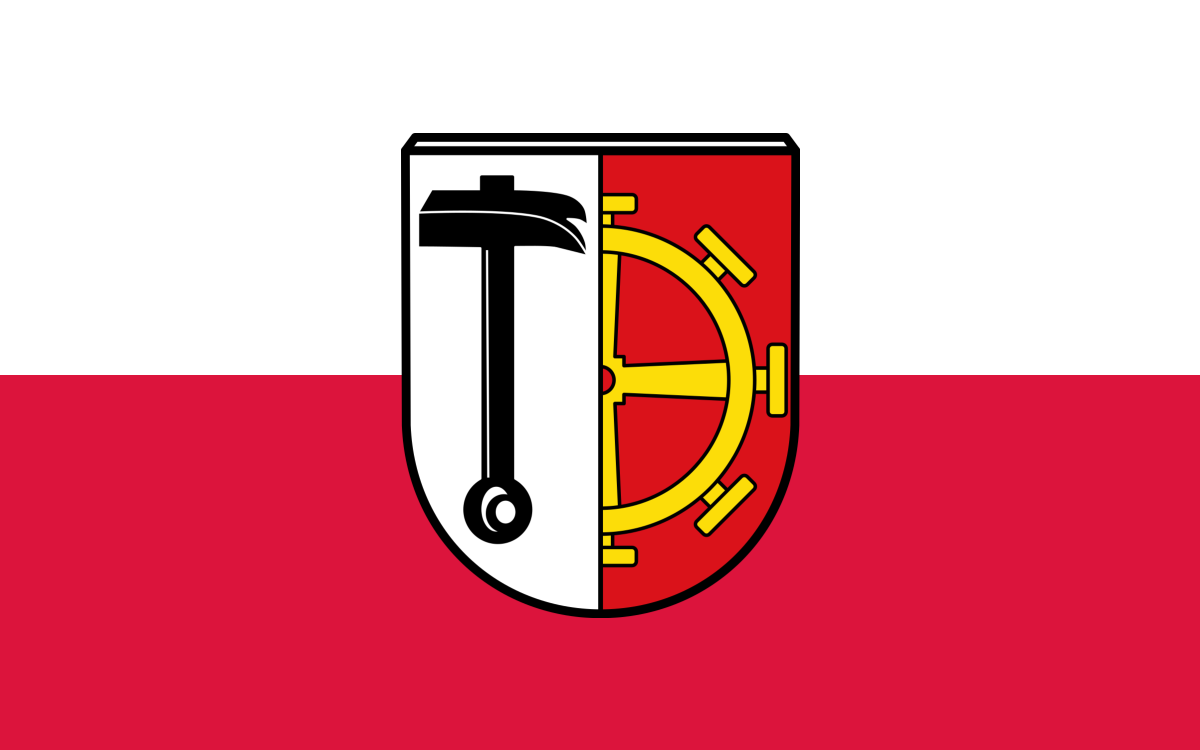
- Flag Coat of arms

- Location of Schmidmühlen within Amberg-Sulzbach district
- Interactive map of Schmidmühlen
- Location within Germany Location within Bavaria
- Coordinates: 49°16′N 11°56′E
- Country: Germany
- State: Bavaria
- Admin. region: Oberpfalz
- District: Amberg-Sulzbach

Government
  - Mayor (2020–26): Peter Braun (CSU)

Area
  - Total: 25.33 km^{2} (9.78 sq mi)
- Elevation: 355 m (1,165 ft)

Population (2025-12-31)
  - Total: 2,280
  - Density: 90.0/km^{2} (233/sq mi)
- Time zone: UTC+01:00 (CET)
  - Summer (DST): UTC+02:00 (CEST)
- Postal codes: 92287
- Dialling codes: 09474
- Vehicle registration: AS
- Website: www.schmidmuehlen.de

Schmidmühlen (German pronunciation: [ʃmɪtˈmyːlən]) is a municipality in the district of Amberg-Sulzbach in Bavaria in Germany. It is situated at the junction of the Vils and Lauterach rivers.

== Geography ==
Apart from Schmidmühlen the municipality consists of the following villages:

- Archenleiten
- Baumhof
- Blaugrund
- Brunnhof
- Brunnmühle
- Eglsee
- Emhof
- Galching
- Greining
- Harschhof
- Hirschberg
- Markhof
- Oberadlhof
- Oberes und unteres Forsthaus
- Ofen
- Pettenhof
- Pirkenhof
- Scharltal
- Schmidmühlen
- Sinzenhof
- Unteradlhof
- Vilshof
- Winbuch
- Zanklberg

== History ==
The town was first recorded in 1010. In 1270 it received the right to hold a market from Louis II, Duke of Bavaria as recorded in an Urbarium. It was a commercial center due to its location on the Vils and Lauterach rivers, as well as the site of one of the largest hammer works in that era. The city was a local seat of government and belonged to the Munich line of the House of Wittelsbach. In 1505, Schmidmühlen was incorporated along with other properties of Bavarian Nordgau in the newly created Duchy of Pfalz-Neuburg.

The border of the Upper Palatinate was three kilometers to the north, which always led to clashes, especially with the powerful city of Amberg.

During the War of Spanish Succession, the so-called Battle of Schmidmühlen took place in 1703.

With Karl Theodor von Pfalz-Sulzbach becoming Elector Duke of Bavaria in 1778 government takeover, the area was again part of the Electorate of Bavaria, but the areas were incorporated only after the Napoleonic Wars of the Upper Palatinate. Schmidmühlen possessed a market court with magisterial proper rights.

As part of the administrative reforms in Bavaria, in the community edict (the 'Gemeindeedikt von 1818') of 1818, the present municipality, which was closely linked to Burglengenfeld as a seat of justice and later as county seat until the local reform.

Today Schmidmühlen is the southernmost municipality of Amberg-Sulzbach. This brought a reorientation in the north, which had started 100 years ago with the construction of the railway line Amberg-Schmidmühlen (1910-1985, now part of the Five Rivers Cycle Route).
