= Rosenbach (surname) =

Rosenbach is a surname, and may refer to:

- A. S. W. Rosenbach (1876–1952), American collector, scholar, and seller of rare books and manuscripts
- Eric Rosenbach, American public servant and retired U.S. Army Captain
- Friedrich Julius Rosenbach (1842–1923), German physician and microbiologist
- Helene Rosenbach, Polish American psychoanalyst
- Marcel Rosenbach (born 1972), German journalist
- Ottomar Rosenbach (1851–1907), German physician
- Timm Rosenbach (born 1966), American football player and coach
- Ulrike Rosenbach (born 1943), video artist from Germany

== See also ==
- Rosenbach (disambiguation)
