= Altdorf West (b Nürnberg) station =

Railway station in Germany

Altdorf West (b Nürnberg)
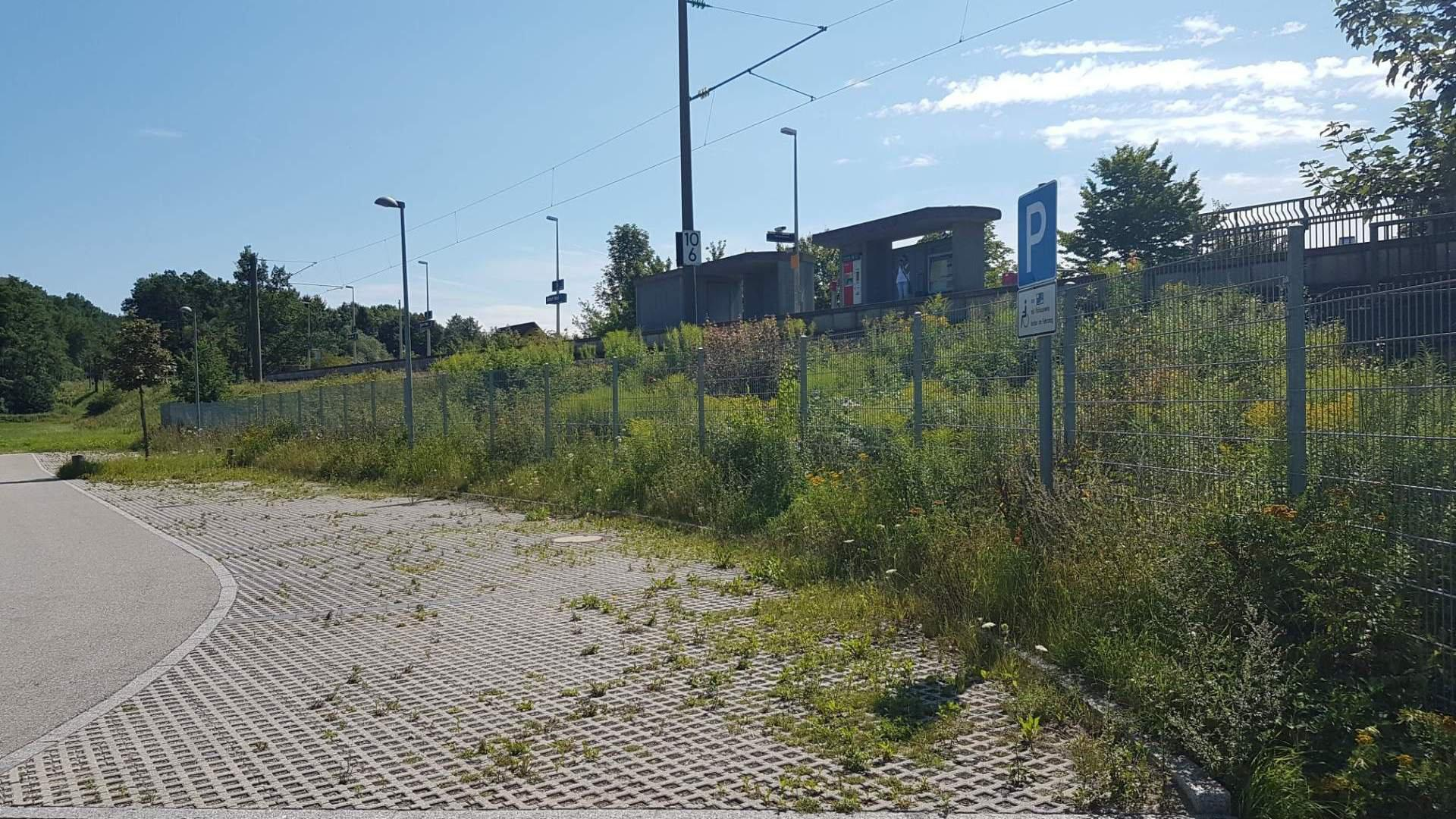
- The station in 2017

General information
- Location: Äußere Fischbacher Straße; Altdorf bei Nürnberg, Bavaria; Germany
- Coordinates: 49°23′28″N 11°20′29″E
- Owner: DB Netz
- Operator: DB Station&Service
- Lines: Feucht–Altdorf line (KBS 890.2)
- Distance: 10.6 km (6.6 mi) from Nürnberg Hauptbahnhof
- Platforms: 1 side platform
- Tracks: 1
- Train operators: DB Regio Bayern
- Connections: 331 332 332E 550 551 553 554 555 556 557

Other information
- Station code: 76
- DS100 code: NADW
- IBNR: 8000504
- Category: 6
- Fare zone: VGN: 533
- Website: www.bahnhof.de

Services
Preceding station	Nuremberg S-Bahn	Following station
Ludersheim towards Roth	S2	Altdorf (b Nürnberg) towards Hartmannshof
Location

Altdorf West (b Nürnberg) station is a railway station in the western part of the municipality of Altdorf bei Nürnberg, located in the Nürnberger Land district in Middle Franconia, Germany. The station is on the Feucht–Altdorf line of Deutsche Bahn.
