= Feucht–Altdorf railway =

Railway line in Germany

Feucht – Altdorf
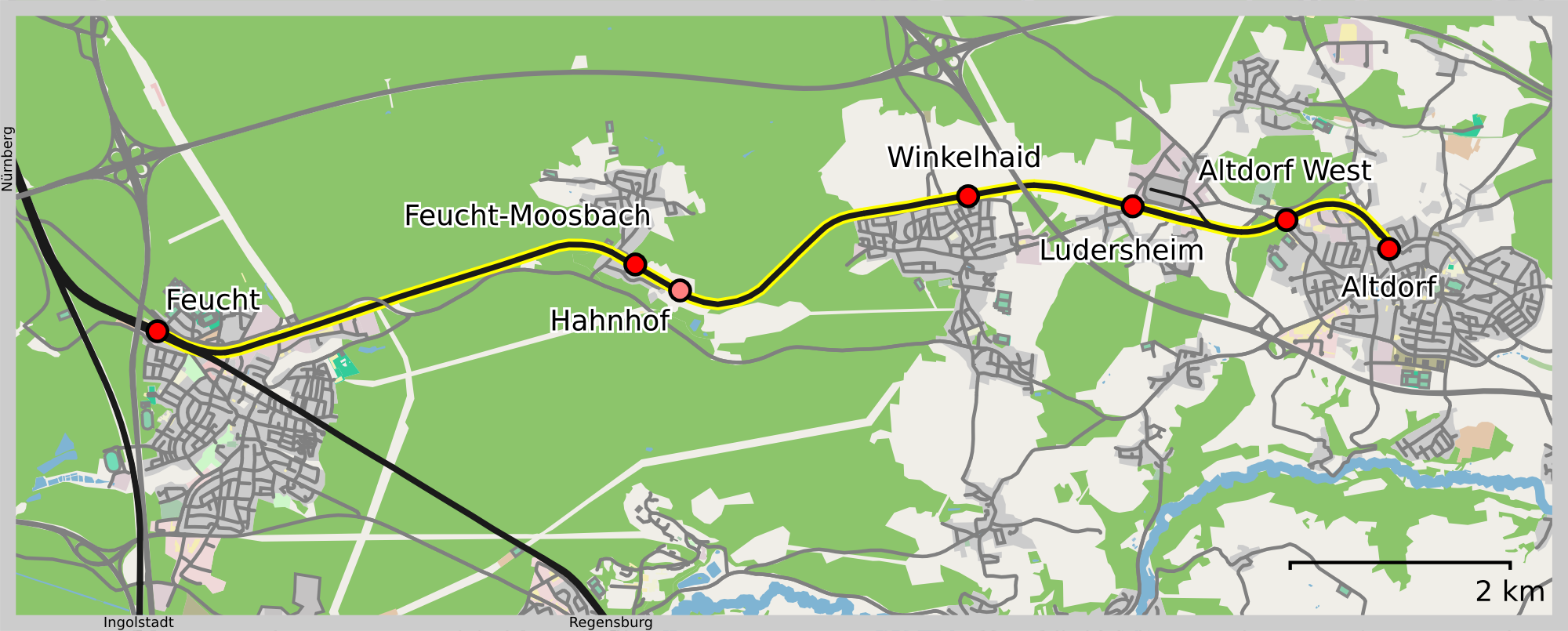
- Map of the Feucht–Altdorf line

Overview
- Line number: 5933
- Locale: Bavaria, Germany

Service
- Route number: 890.2

Technical
- Line length: 11.6 km (7.2 mi)
- Track gauge: 1,435 mm (4 ft 8 1/2 in) standard gauge
- Electrification: 15 kV/16.7 Hz AC catenary

The Feucht–Altdorf railway is a single-track main-line railway running through Middle Franconia in the German state of Bavaria. It is the extension of the Nuremberg–Feucht railway, which ends at Feucht station, and runs from there to the east through the Lorenzer Reichswald (“St. Lorenz Imperial Forest”) to Altdorf.

== History ==
At its opening the line already connected with the line from Nuremberg to Regensburg. There were plans as early as 1836 to extend the Ludwig Railway via Feucht to Altdorf and then continuing along the Lauterach, Vils and the Naab rivers to Regensburg. The plans, however, were not realised because King Ludwig I favoured the Ludwig Canal between the Danube and the Main and the railway was seen as a competitor to the canal. Only the enactment of a law for the construction of Vizinalbahnen (branch lines) on 29 April 1869 made it possible to connect Altdorf to the Nuremberg–Regensburg line in Feucht. The line was finally opened on 15 October 1878 by the Royal Bavarian State Railways.

During the electrification of the main line between Nuremberg and Regensburg, which began in May 1950, there were calls for the electrification of the section of the branch line to the town of Altdorf. The efforts were successful, so that the first electric railcars ran on the line on 2 September 1952.

=== Conversion for the S-Bahn ===
When it was decided to build an S-Bahn network in Nuremberg, it was determined that the first stage of construction should include, in addition to the lines to Lauf and to Roth, the line from Feucht to Altdorf. Preparatory work began in 1984 and work on adapting the line for S-Bahn operations began on 15 June 1988, with work completed for the opening of S-Bahn services on the line on 22 November 1992. The cost of building the works for the entire S2 service amounted to 587 million Deutsche Marks (€300.13 million).

The works included the refurbishment of the superstructure and the removal of many level crossings to improve line speed from 60 to 100 km/h and the rehabilitation of the track bed. The branch line was upgraded to main line standards. The platforms of the existing intermediate stations were brought up to S-Bahn standards with 145 metres (475 ft) long and 96 centimetres (38 in) high platforms. Moosbach (formerly Hahnhof) station was moved 600 metres (2,000 ft) towards Feucht and renamed as Feucht-Moosbach to improve its accessibility to the Moosbach district. Altdorf West station was re-established to promote the development of a residential and commercial area on the western edge of Altdorf, including two schools. The train crossing point was moved from Winkelhaid station, where the crossing loop was removed, to Ludersheim station, which gained a passing loop.

== Operations ==
Today the line is operated with push-pull trains, composed of class 143 electric locomotives with four x-Wagen (carriages), designated as line S2. Before the S-Bahn era it was served by class 432 electric multiple units and later by electric locomotives of class 141 with Silberling carriages.
