= Rosenbach (Vils) =

River in Bavaria

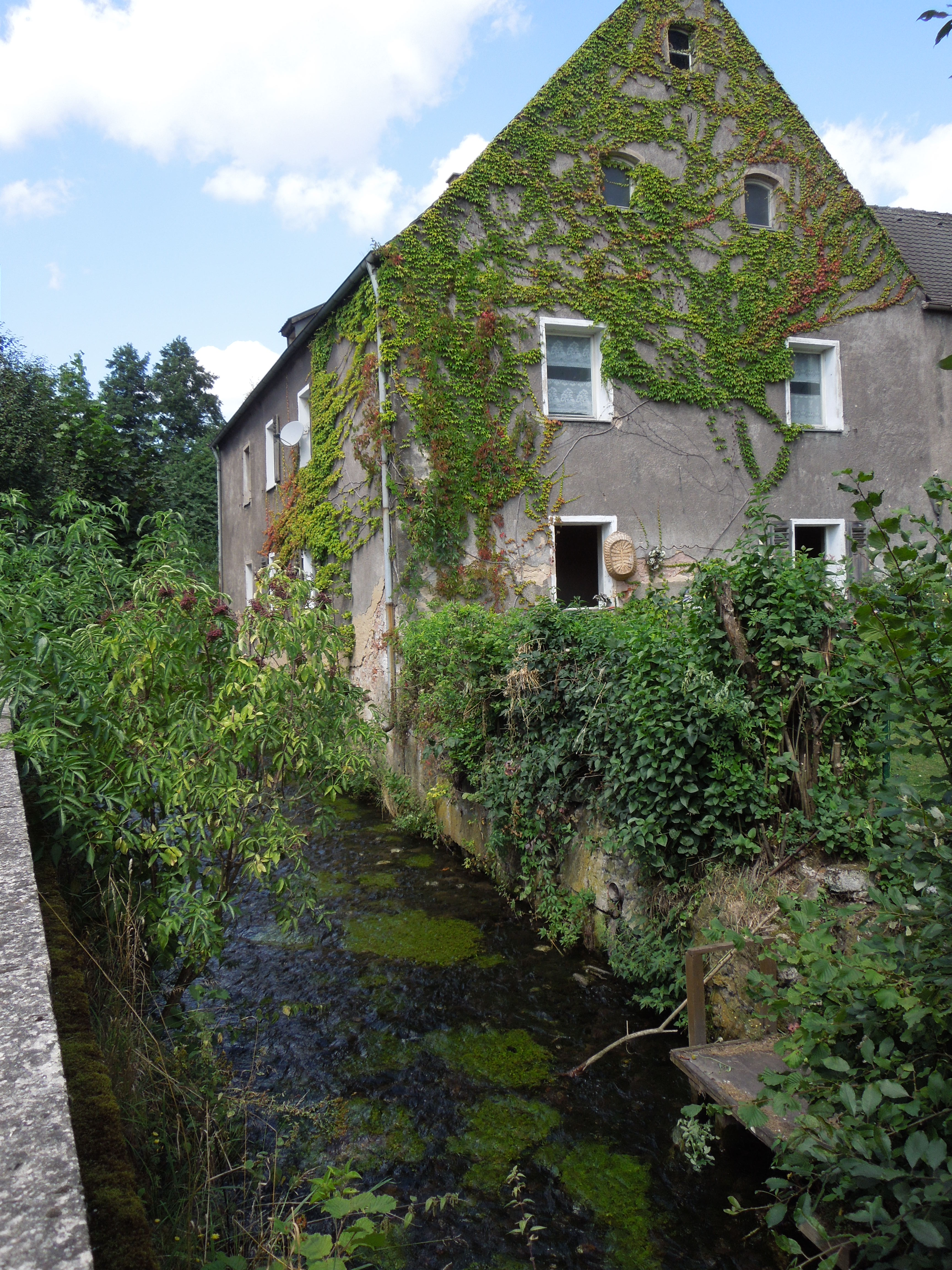
- The Rosenbach at the Hammer Philippsburg

Location
- Country: Germany
- State: Bavaria

Physical characteristics
- Mouth
  - location: Vils
  - coordinates: 49.4926°N 11.8225°E
- Length: 15.0 km (9.3 mi)

Basin features
- Progression: Vils→ Naab→ Danube→ Black Sea

Rosenbach (in its upper course: Klafferbach) is a river of Bavaria, Germany. It is a right tributary of the Vils near Poppenricht.

== See also ==
- List of rivers of Bavaria
