= Duggendorf =

- Municipality
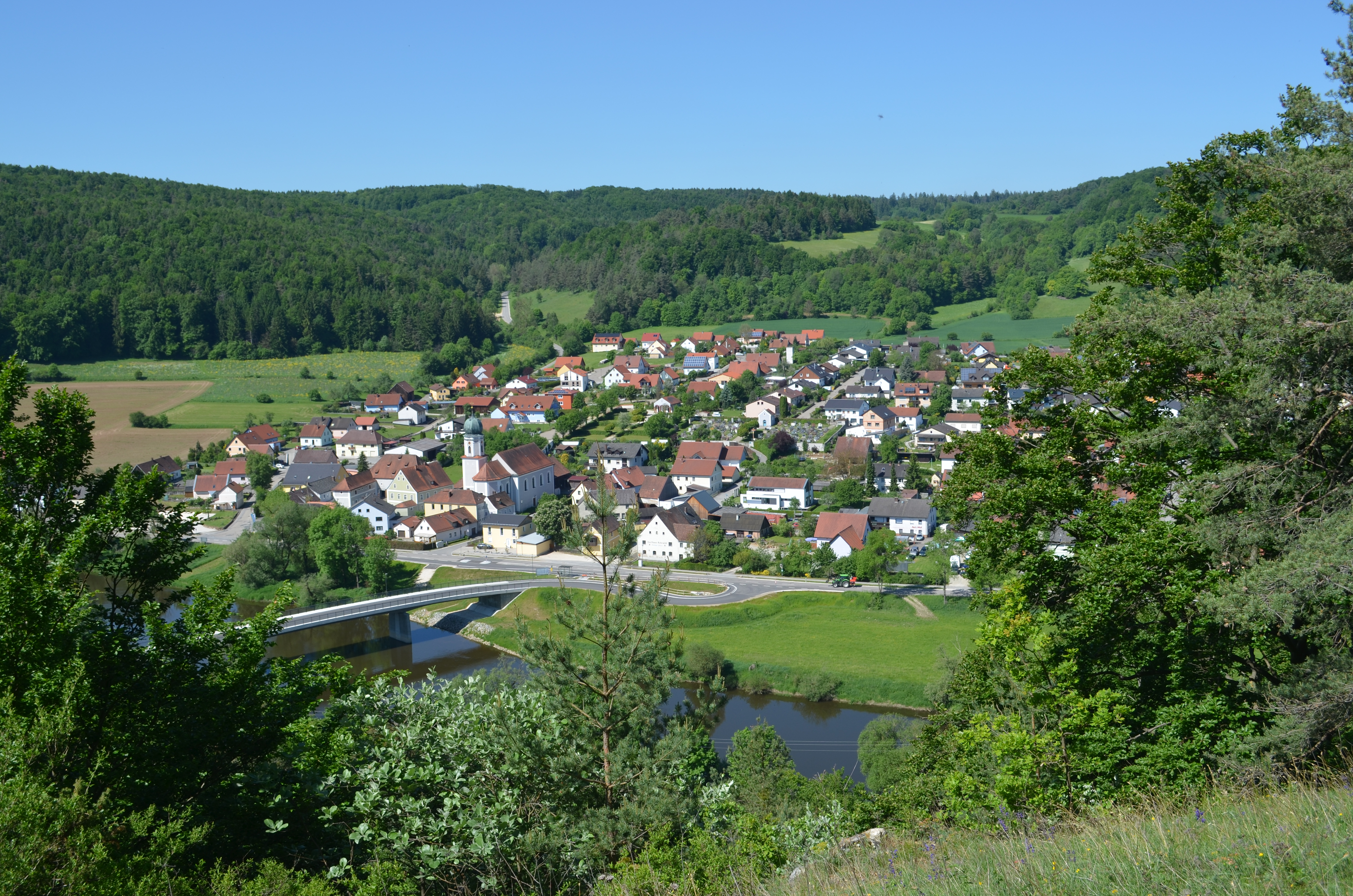
- Duggendorf seen from Jakobenberg

- Coat of arms

- Location of Duggendorf within Regensburg district
- Interactive map of Duggendorf
- Location within Germany Location within Bavaria
- Coordinates: 49°6′33″N 11°56′2″E
- Country: Germany
- State: Bavaria
- Admin. region: Oberpfalz
- District: Regensburg
- Municipal assoc.: Kallmünz

Government
  - Mayor (2020–26): Thomas Eichenseher (CSU)

Area
  - Total: 22.03 km^{2} (8.51 sq mi)
- Elevation: 338 m (1,109 ft)

Population (2025-12-31)
  - Total: 1,501
  - Density: 68.13/km^{2} (176.5/sq mi)
- Time zone: UTC+01:00 (CET)
  - Summer (DST): UTC+02:00 (CEST)
- Postal codes: 93182
- Dialling codes: 09473, 09409
- Vehicle registration: R
- Website: www.duggendorf.de

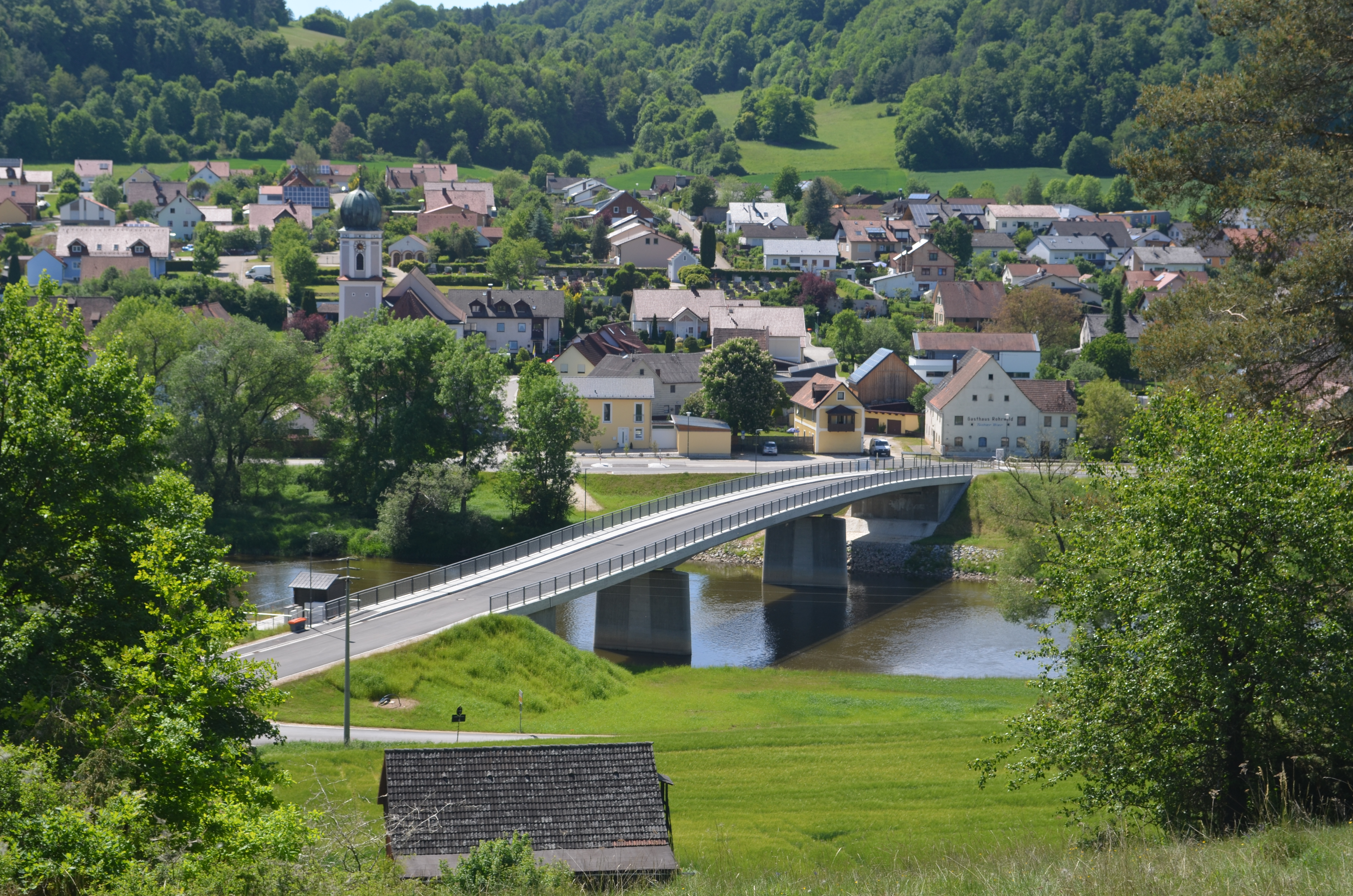
Bridge over the Naab River in Duggendorf

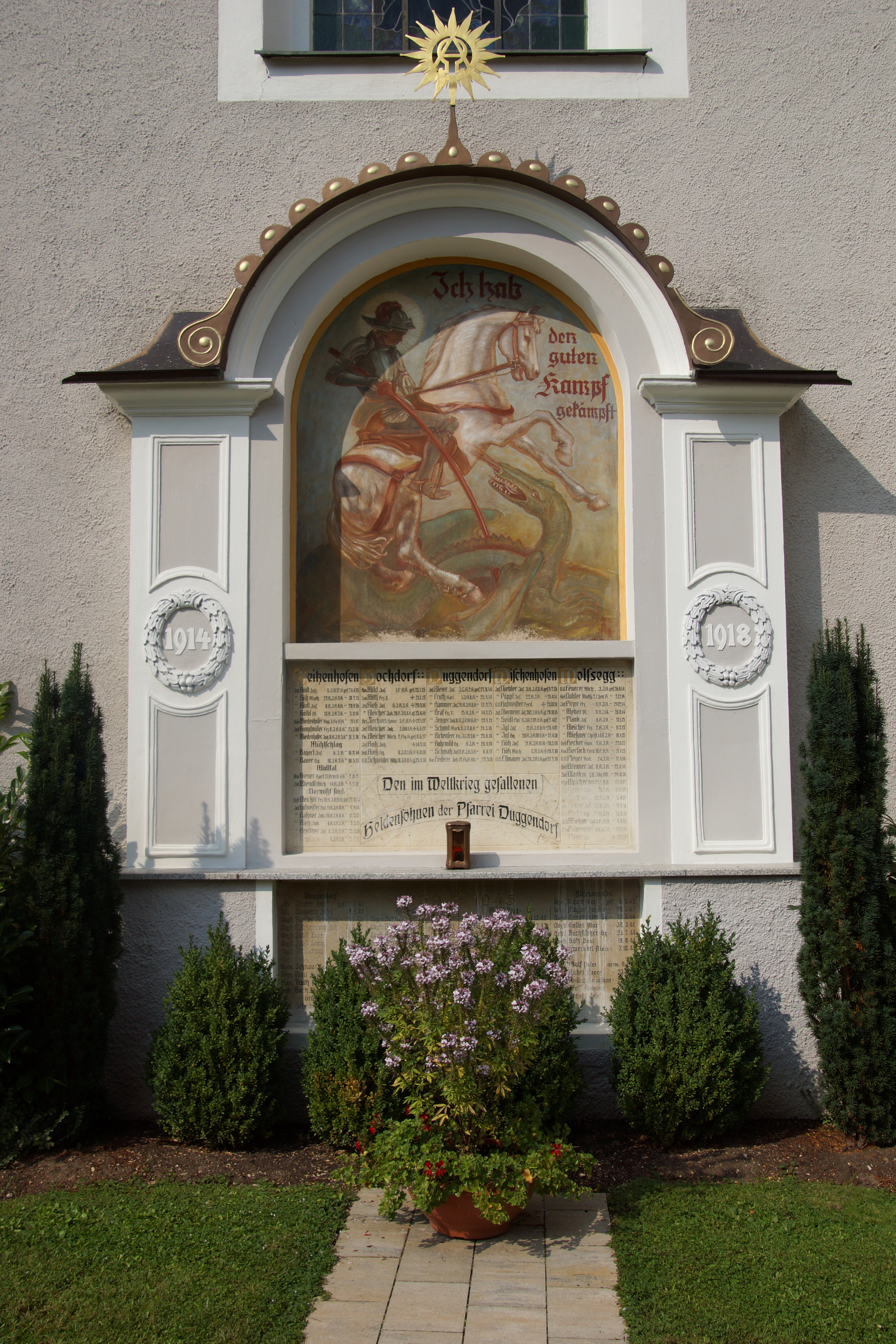
World War I memorial in the parish church of the Assumption in Duggendorf, designed by Albert Reich in 1920

Duggendorf is a municipality located on the Naab River in the district of Regensburg in Bavaria in Germany.
