= Kallmünz =

- Municipality
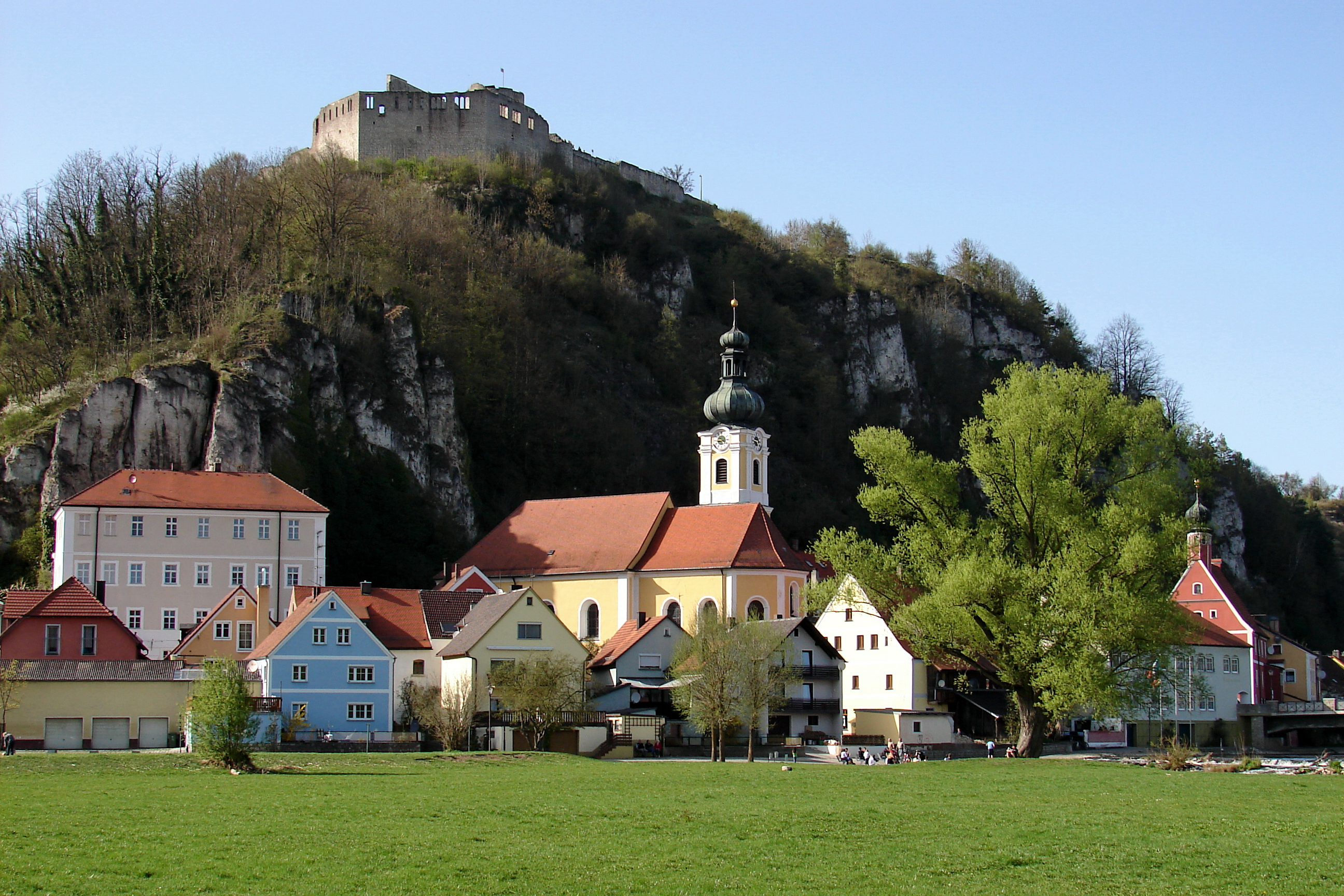
- View of the town with Saint Michael's Church and the castle ruins

- Coat of arms

- Location of Kallmünz within Regensburg district
- Interactive map of Kallmünz
- Location within Germany Location within Bavaria
- Coordinates: 49°09′40″N 11°57′39″E
- Country: Germany
- State: Bavaria
- Admin. region: Oberpfalz
- District: Regensburg
- Municipal assoc.: Kallmünz

Government
  - Mayor (2023–29): Martin Schmid

Area
  - Total: 43.19 km^{2} (16.68 sq mi)
- Elevation: 380 m (1,250 ft)

Population (2025-12-31)
  - Total: 2,823
  - Density: 65.36/km^{2} (169.3/sq mi)
- Time zone: UTC+01:00 (CET)
  - Summer (DST): UTC+02:00 (CEST)
- Postal codes: 93183
- Dialling codes: 09473
- Vehicle registration: R
- Website: www.kallmuenz.de

Kallmünz is a municipality in the district of Regensburg in Bavaria, Germany. Located on Naab River about 25 km north of Regensburg, Kallmünz has preserved a beautiful medieval center. The main attractions are the ruins of the Kallmünz Castle above the town on a cliff and the old stone bridge over the Naab River. The Russian painter Wassily Kandinsky and the German expressionist painter Gabriele Münter met in Kallmünz during the summer of 1903. Since then, Kallmünz has been the constant home of a small art colony.

Kallmünz Castle, the seat of the former Counts of Kallmünz, has been fortified since the Bronze Age. Kallmünz also has a medieval bridge bearing masons' marks over the Naab River.

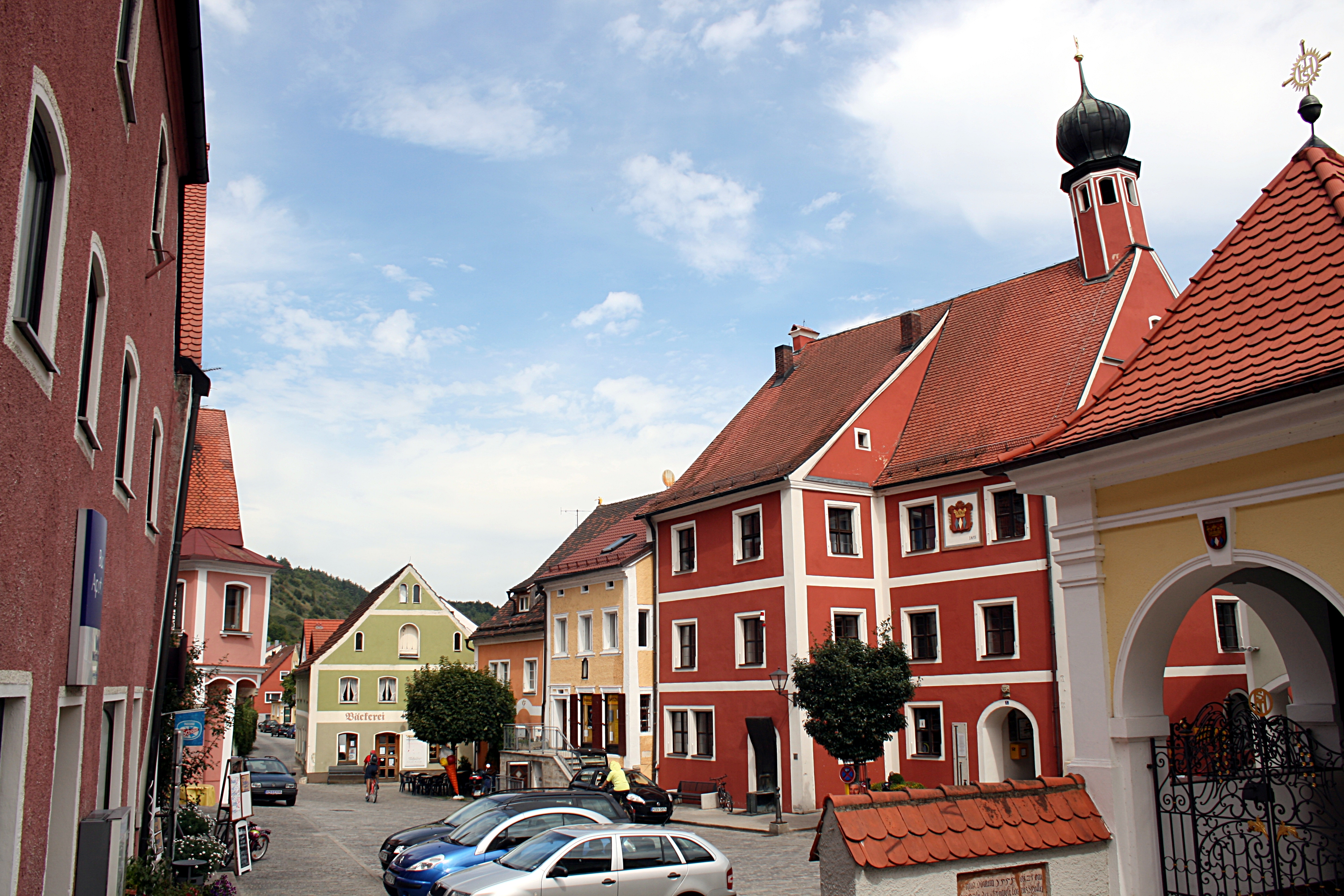
Marktplatz (Market Square) in the heart of Kallmünz

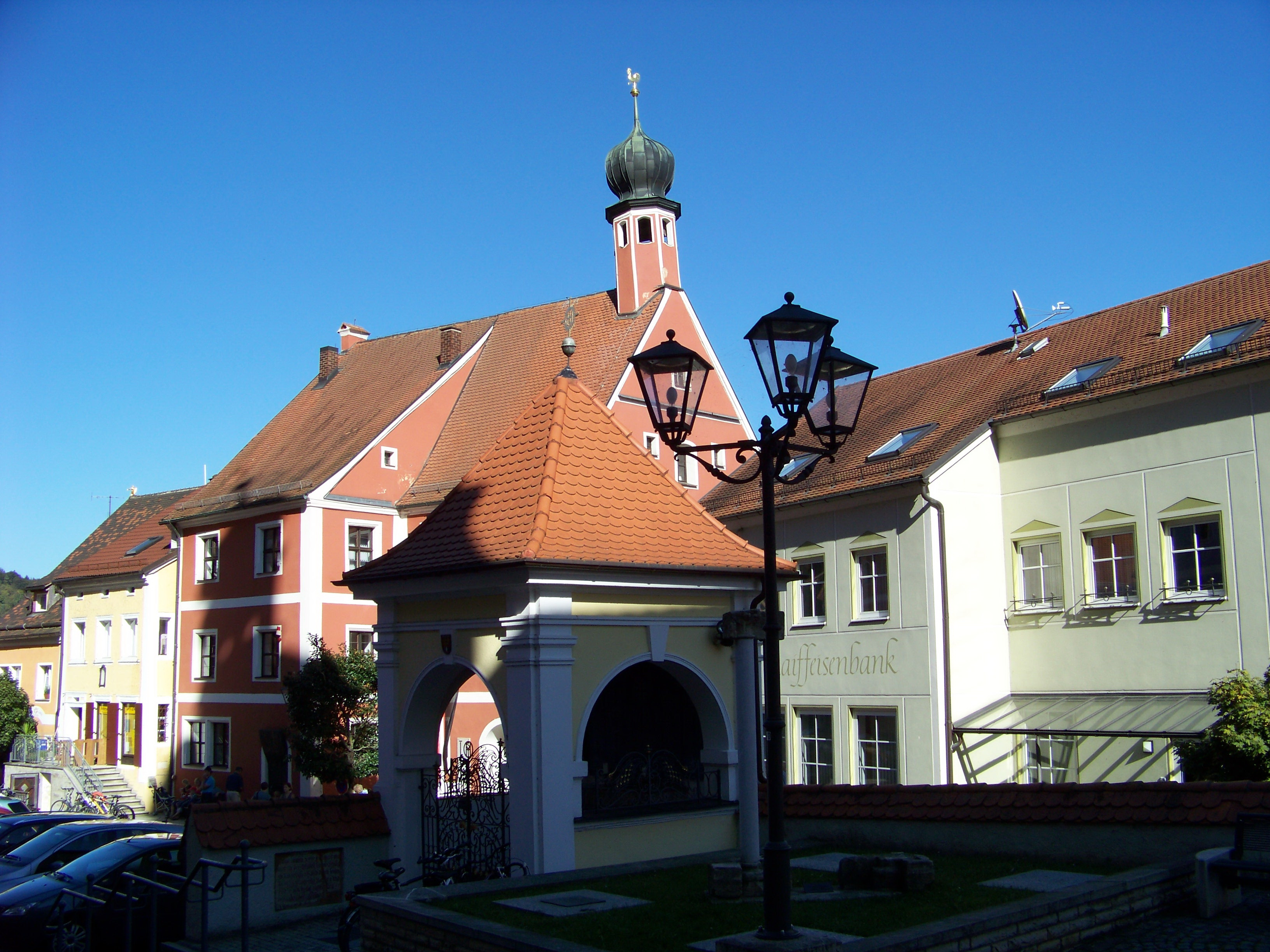
World War I memorial on Marktplatz, designed by Albert Reich in 1922-1923

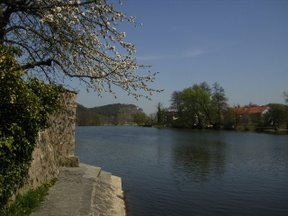
The Naab River at Kallmünz
