= Vils (Naab) =

River in Germany

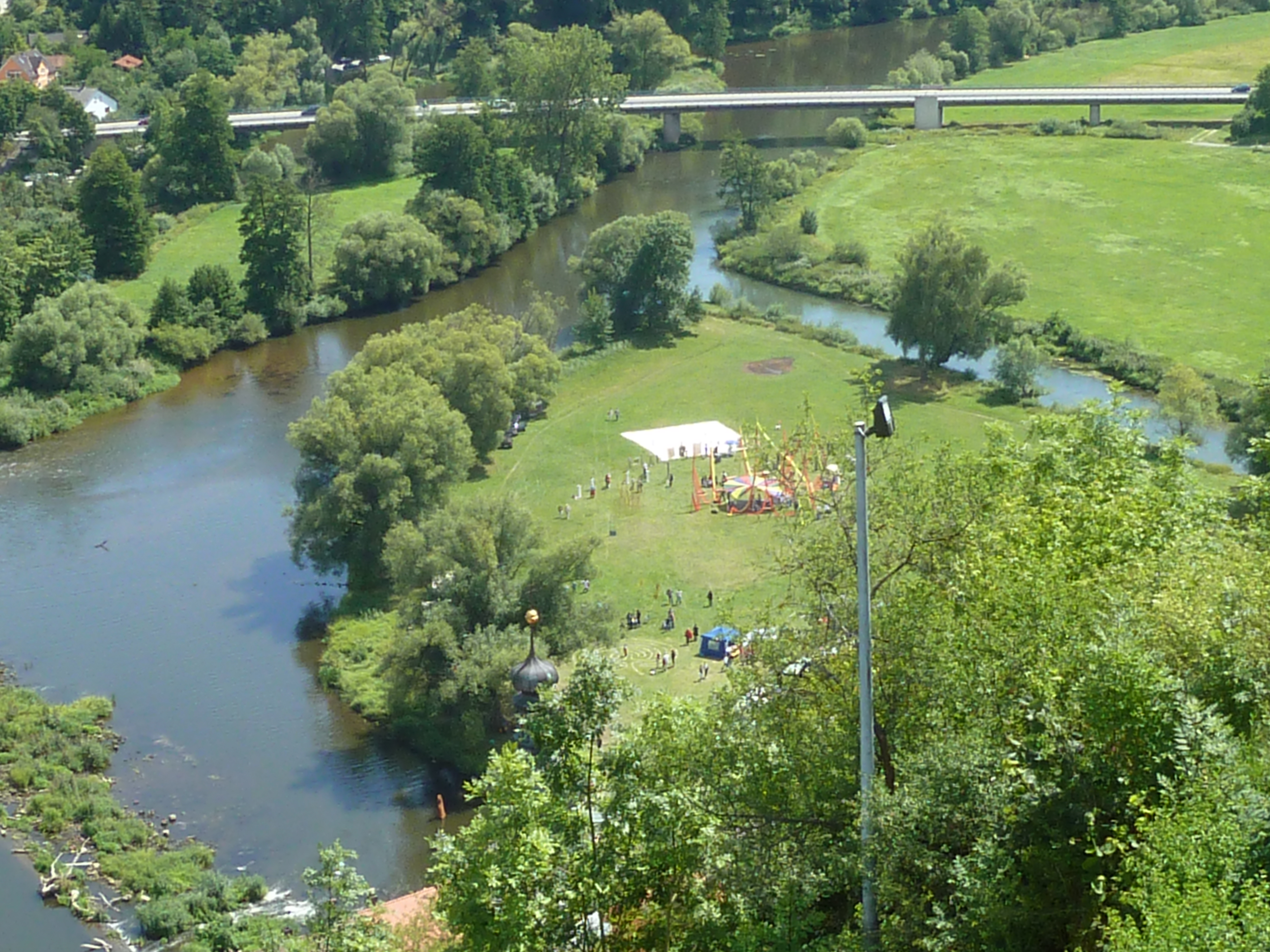
- The Vils, flowing into the Naab from the right

Location
- Country: Germany
- State: Bavaria

Physical characteristics
- Source
  - location: Upper Palatinate
- Mouth
  - location: Naab
  - coordinates: 49°9′32″N 11°57′19″E
- Length: 87.4 km (54.3 mi)
- Basin size: 1,239 km^{2} (478 sq mi)

Basin features
- Progression: Naab→ Danube→ Black Sea

The Vils (German pronunciation: [fɪls]) is a river in Bavaria, Germany.

Its source is near Freihung. The 87 km (54 mi)-long Vils flows generally south through the towns of Vilseck, Amberg and Schmidmühlen. It is a right tributary of the Naab in Kallmünz.

== See also ==
- List of rivers of Bavaria
