= Lauterbach =

Lauterbach (German pronunciation: [ˈlaʊtɐbax]) is a German name originally meaning "pure/clear stream". It may refer to:

== Rivers ==
=== Austria ===
- Lauterbach, a tributary of the Brixentaler Ache in the Brixental valley, Austria

=== Germany ===
- Lauterbach (Schiltach), a river in Baden-Württemberg, tributary of the Schiltach
- Lauterbach (Werra), a river of Thuringia, tributary of the Werra

== Places ==
=== Austria ===
- Lauterbach, Austria, a village in Brixen im Thale in the Kitzbühel Mountains

=== France ===
- Lauterbach, a locality close to Mulhouse where Claude Louis, Comte de Saint-Germain had an estate

=== Germany ===
- Lauterbach, Baden-Württemberg, a municipality in the district of Rottweil
- Lauterbach, Hesse, the district capital of the Vogelsberg district of Hesse
- Lauterbach (Marienberg), a district of the town Marienberg, Saxony
- Lauterbach (Rügen), a village in the district of Vorpommern-Rügen
- Lauterbach, Thuringia, a municipality in the Wartburgkreis district of Thuringia
- Lauterbach (Warndt), a district of Völklingen, Saarland

== People ==
- Lauterbach (surname), a German surname

== Other uses ==
- Lauterbach (company), a German electronic design automation company
- Lauterbach Stradivarius, an antique violin
- Lauterbach's Bowerbird, a bowerbird

== See also ==
- Lautenbach (disambiguation)
- Laudenbach (disambiguation)
