= Vogtsbach =

River in Germany

Location
- Country: Germany
- State: Baden-Württemberg

Physical characteristics
- Mouth
  - location: Göttelbach
  - coordinates: 48.2287°N 8.3873°E

Basin features
- Progression: Göttelbach→ Schiltach→ Kinzig→ Rhine→ North Sea

Vogtsbach is a small river of Baden-Württemberg, Germany. It flows into the Göttelbach in Schramberg.

== See also ==
- List of rivers of Baden-Württemberg
