= Władysław Skoczylas =

Polish artist (1883–1934)

Olympic medal record

Art competitions
Bronze medal – third place	1928 Amsterdam	Drawings

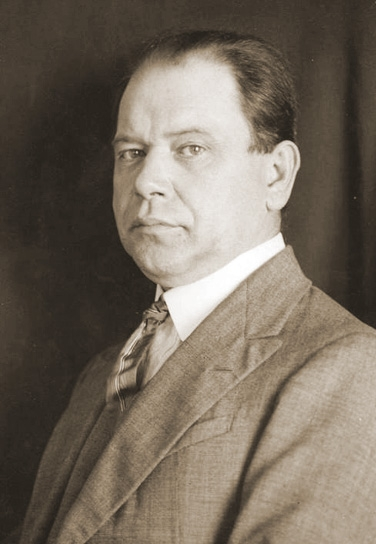
Władysław Skoczylas (1928)

Władysław Skoczylas (4 April 1883, Wieliczka – 8 April 1934, Warsaw) was a Polish watercolorist, woodcutter, sculptor and art teacher.

== Biography ==
His father was a foreman in the salt mines. He graduated from the gymnasium in Bochnia, then attended the Kraków Academy of Fine Arts, where he studied painting with Teodor Axentowicz and Leon Wyczółkowski and sculpture with Konstanty Laszczka. He had to give up oil painting and focus on watercolors, due to an allergy that caused a rash on his hands.

For two years, he taught drawing at the "Wood Industry School" in Zakopane then, from 1910 to 1913, he continued his sculptural studies in Paris with Antoine Bourdelle, followed by classes in woodcutting at the Hochschule für Grafik und Buchkunst in Leipzig.

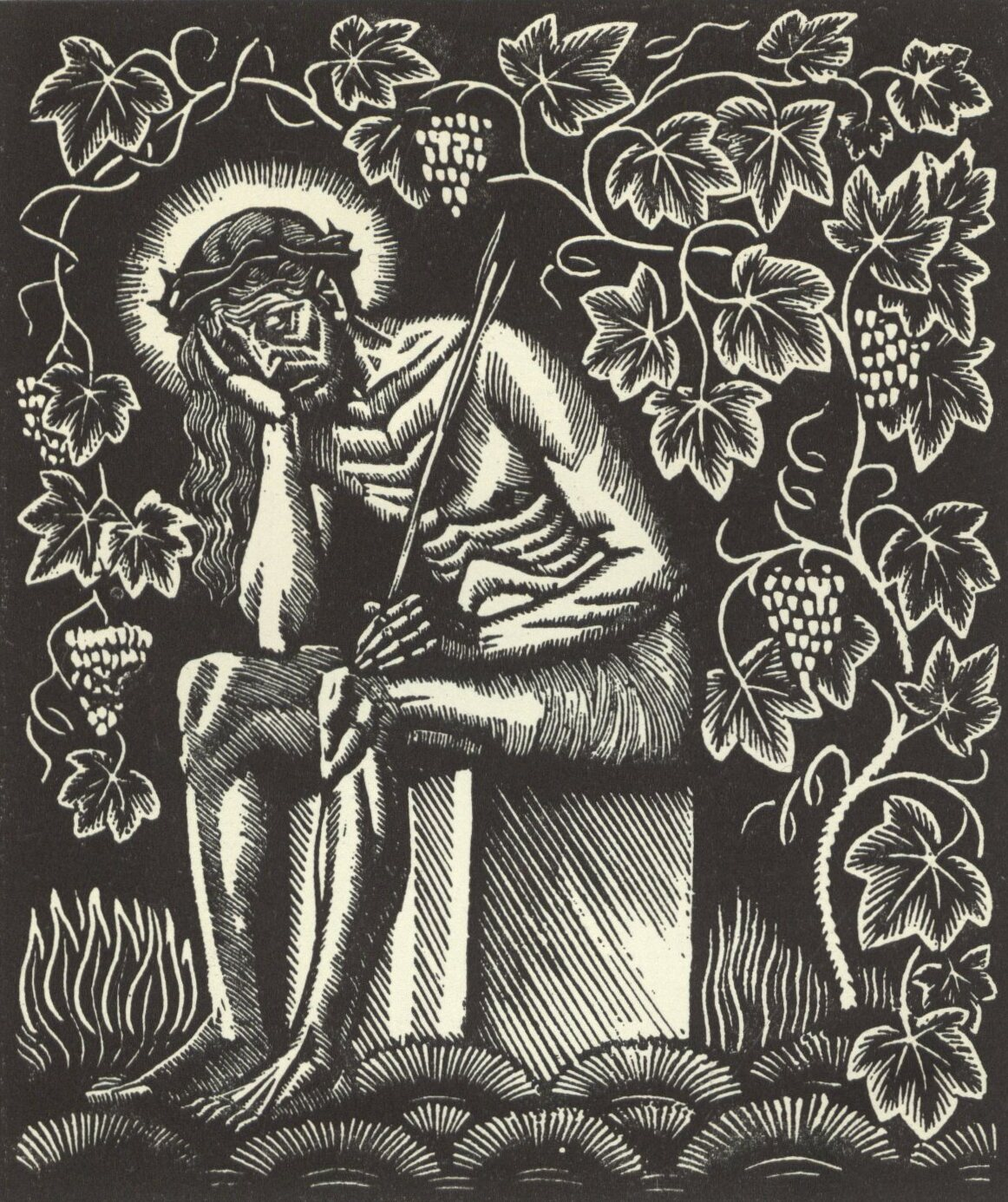
Pensive Christ

In 1914, his woodcuts won an award at the second Henryk Grohman Competition. After the war, he became a Professor at the Warsaw University of Technology and obtained the chair of graphics at the School of Fine Art in 1922. In the Art competitions at the 1928 Olympics in Amsterdam, he was awarded a bronze medal for watercolors on the subject of archery.

During the 1920s, he was co-founder of several groups devoted to the promotion of Polish art and provided illustrations for numerous periodicals. In 1929, he was awarded the Order of Polonia Restituta. From 1930 to 1931, he was Director of the Department of Art at the Ministry of Religious Affairs.

The largest collection of his works and personal memorabilia is currently held at the Kraków Saltworks Museum in Wieliczka. Streets have been named after him in Bochnia, Częstochowa, Wrocław and Warsaw.

== Selected works ==
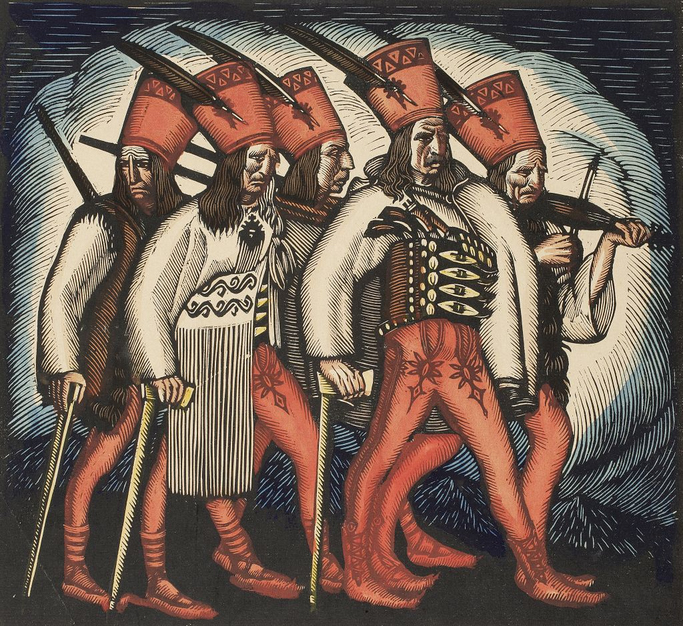
A Procession of Bandits

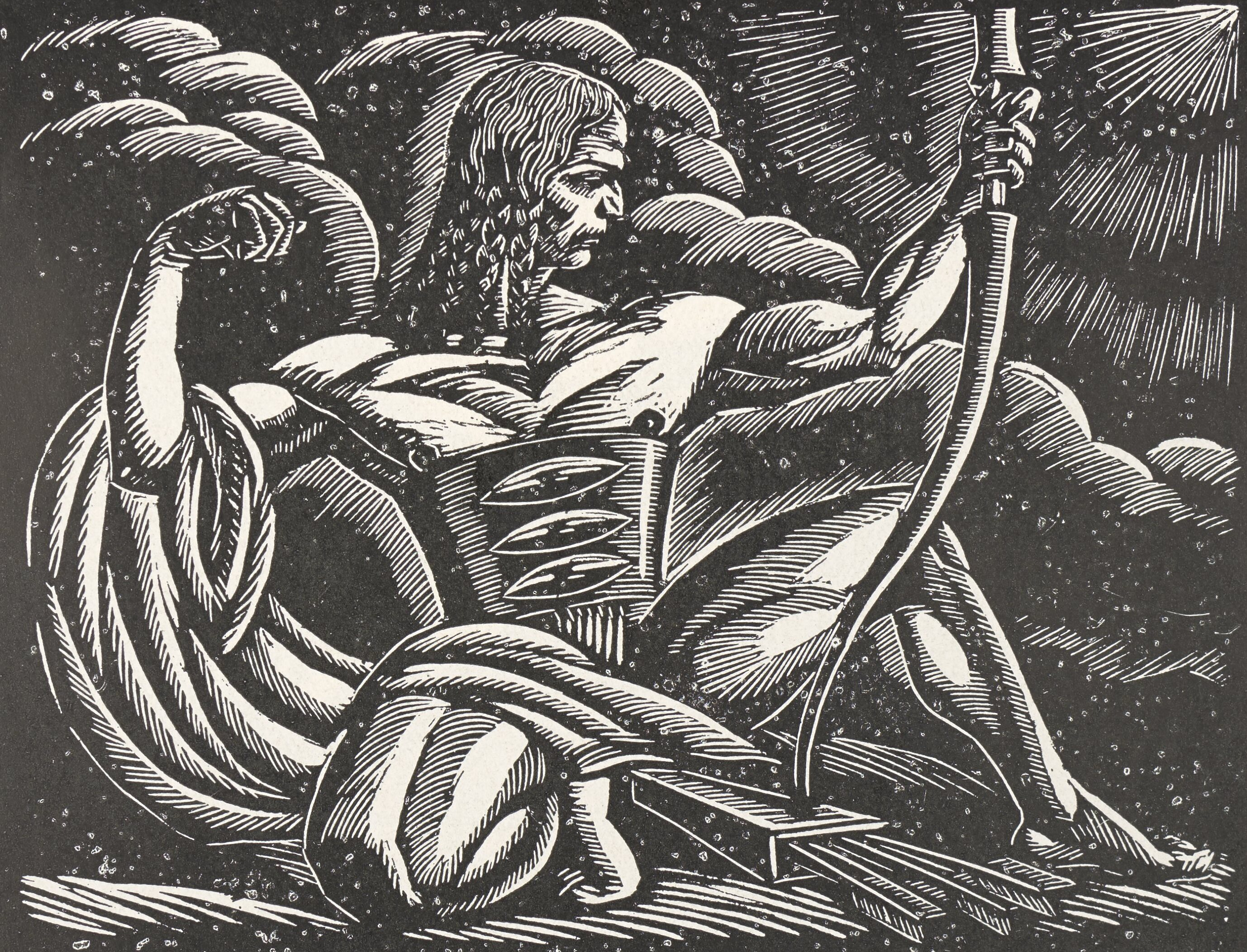
Archer, National Museum in Warsaw

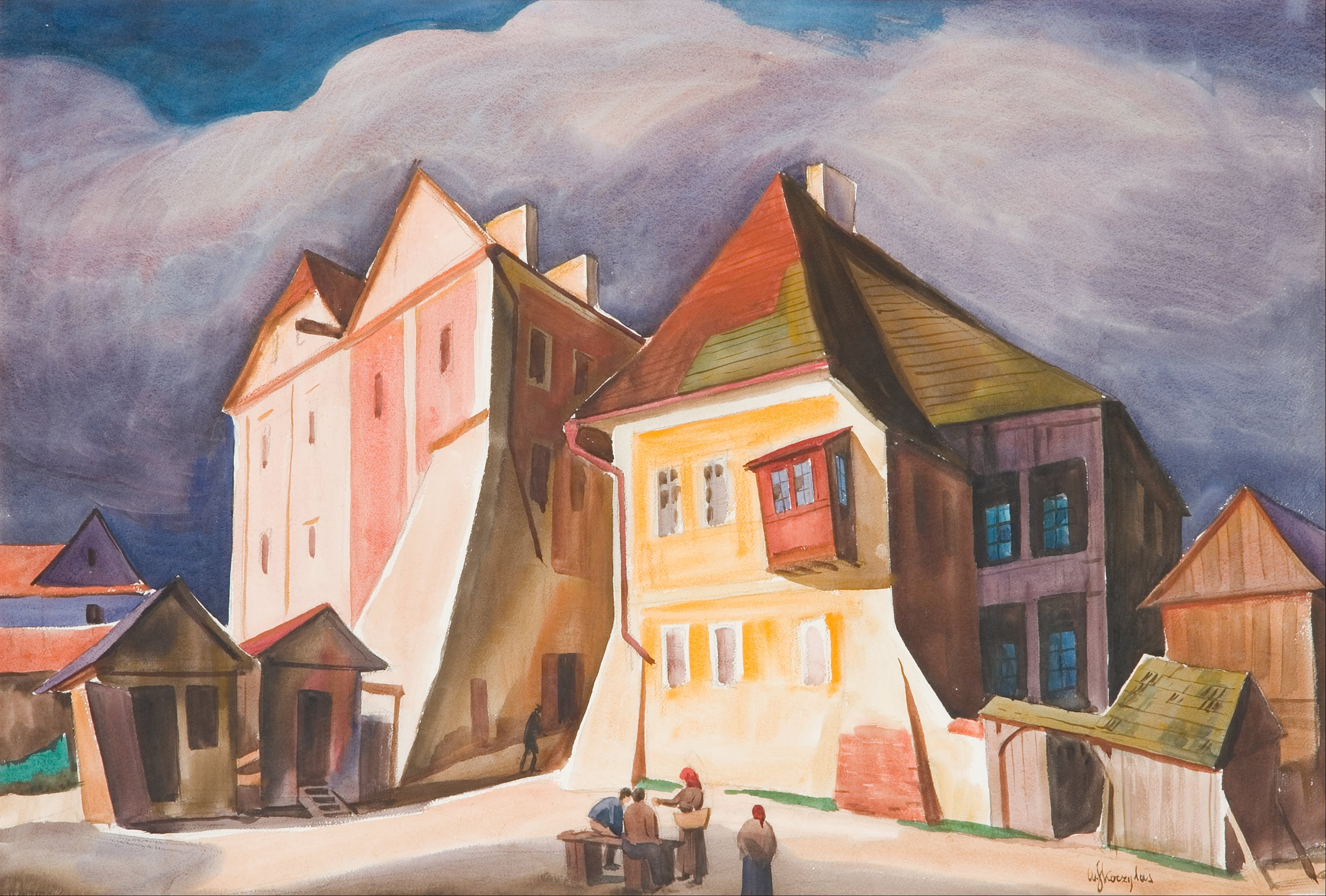
View of Kazimierz Dolny, Muzeum Sztuki w Łodzi

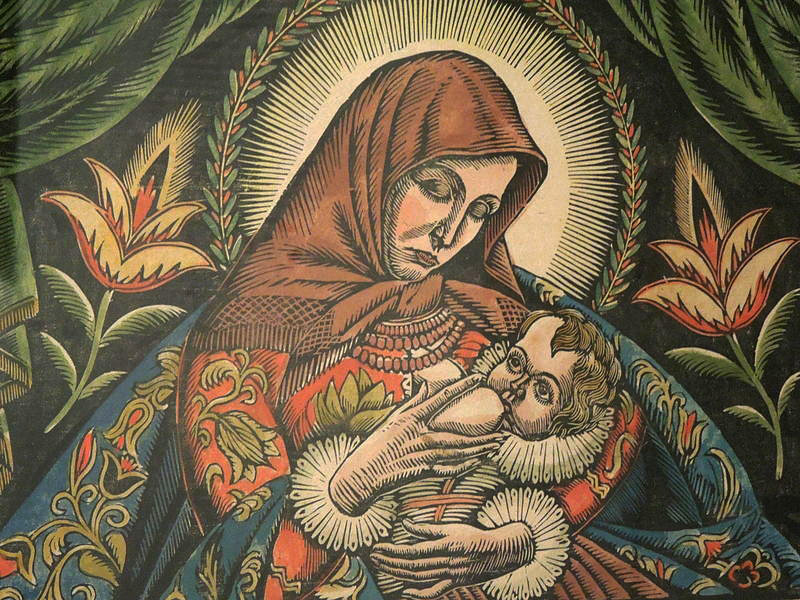
Nursing Madonna, 1923

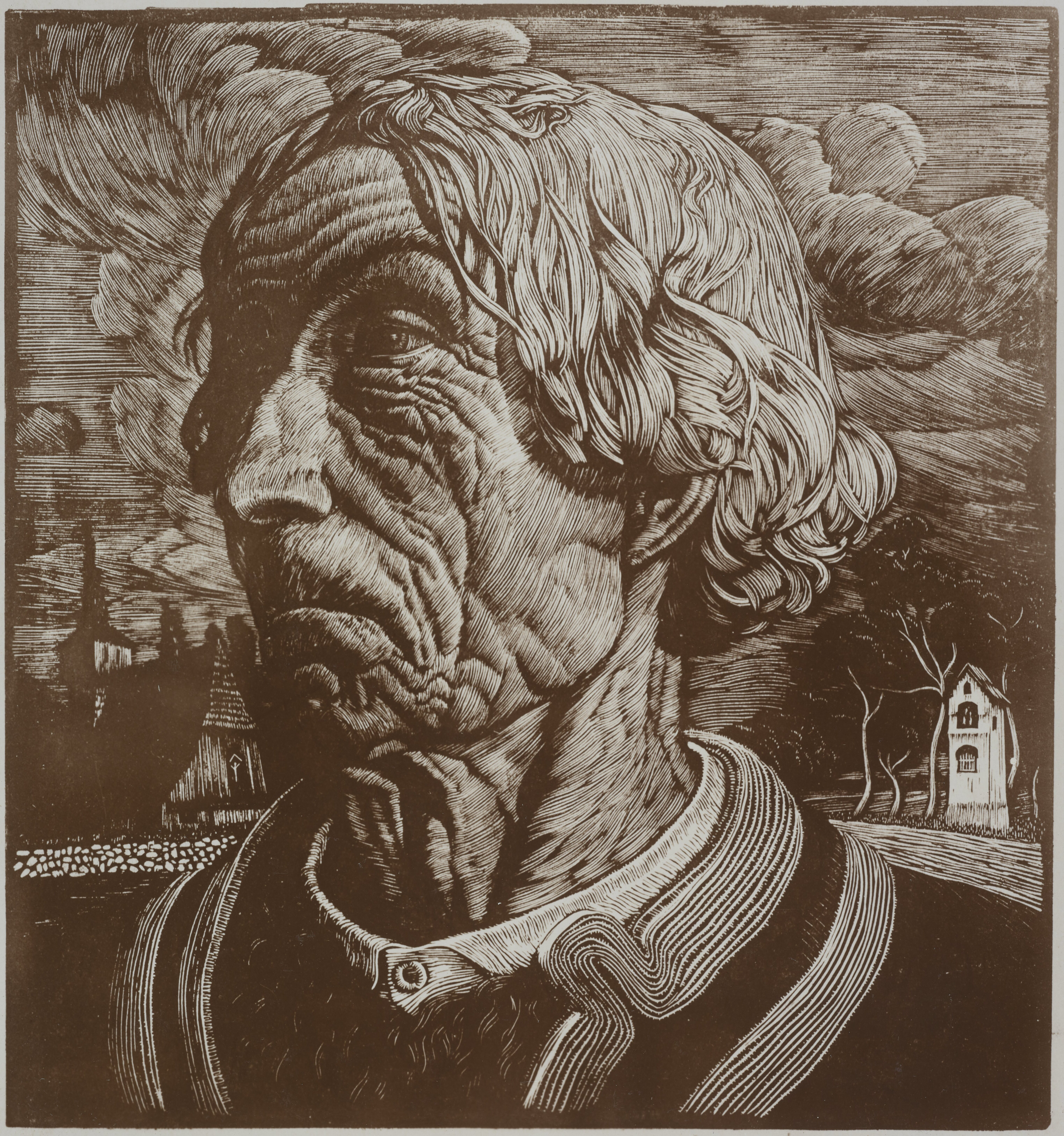
Góral, Tatra Museum

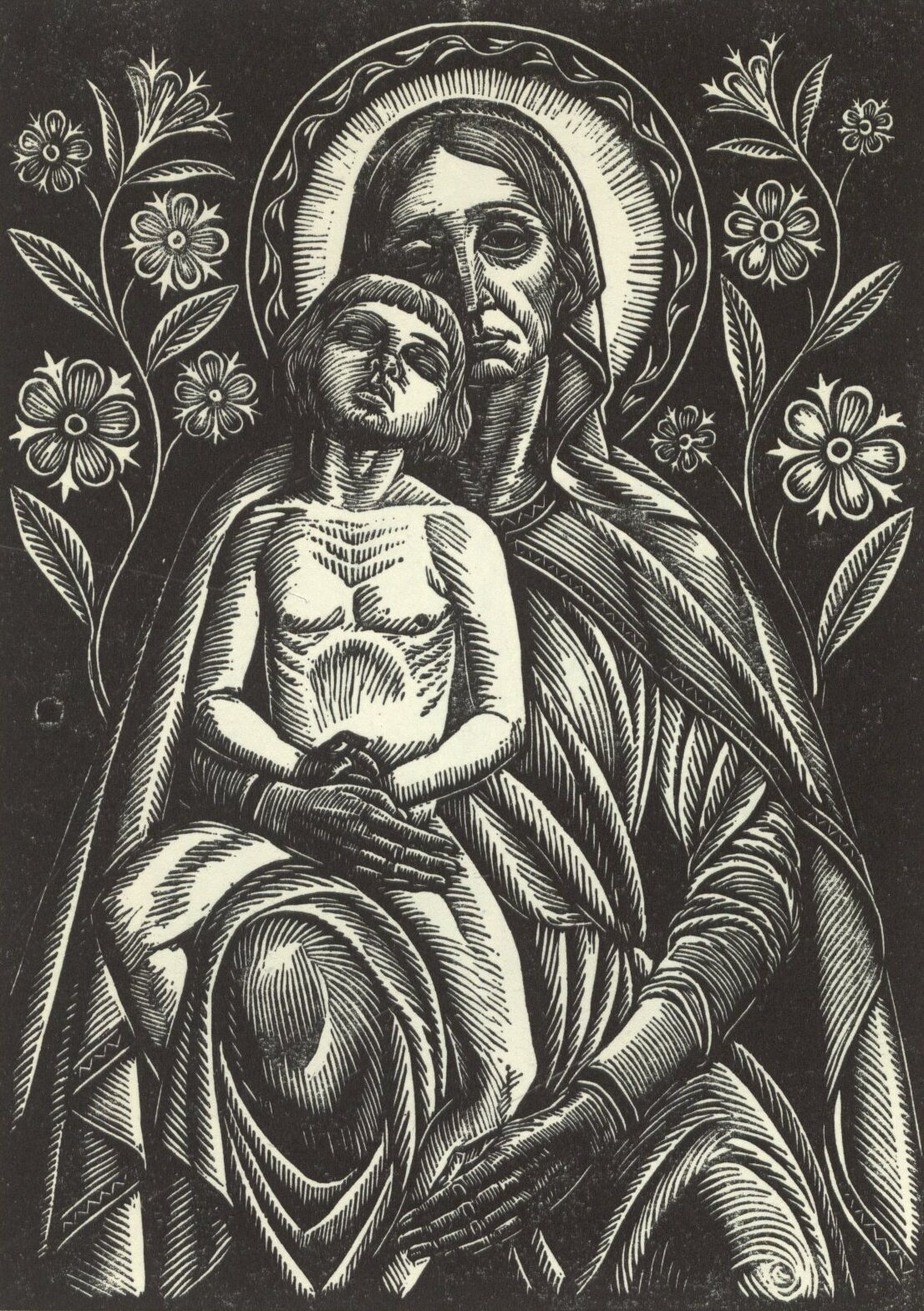
Madonna and Child
