= Alfredo Stanevičius =

- Born: Alfredo Stanevičius; 1942; Montevideo, Uruguay
- Died: 2006 (aged 63–64)
- Known for: Sculpture, engraving, graphic art Lithuanian-themed artwork and cultural activities

Alfredo Stanevičius (1942–2006), also known as Alfredas Stanevičius, was a Uruguayan sculptor, graphic artist and dentist of Lithuanian descent. His work drew on Lithuanian mythology, folklore, history and architecture. He was active in Uruguay's Lithuanian community as a folk-dance director, lecturer and designer of traditional costumes.

== Early life and education ==
Stanevičius was born in 1942 in the Cerro district of Montevideo, Uruguay, to Pranas Stanevičius and Pranė Kondrotaitė, both of Lithuanian descent. His father came from Subačius, near Kupiškis, Lithuania, and settled in Montevideo after emigrating to Uruguay.

Stanevičius was born in 1942 in the Cerro district of Montevideo, Uruguay, to Pranas Stanevičius and Pranė Kondrotaitė, both of Lithuanian descent. His father came from Subačius, near Kupiškis, Lithuania, and settled in Montevideo after emigrating to Uruguay.

== Artistic career ==
Stanevičius produced sculptures, engravings and graphic works inspired by Lithuanian history, mythology and religious traditions. His subjects included Eglė the Queen of Serpents, King Mindaugas and figures from Lithuanian folklore. He worked with wood, plaster, glass, plastic and textiles, sometimes incorporating salvaged materials into his sculptures. His religious works included representations of the Rūpintojėlis, a traditional Lithuanian depiction of the Pensive Christ.

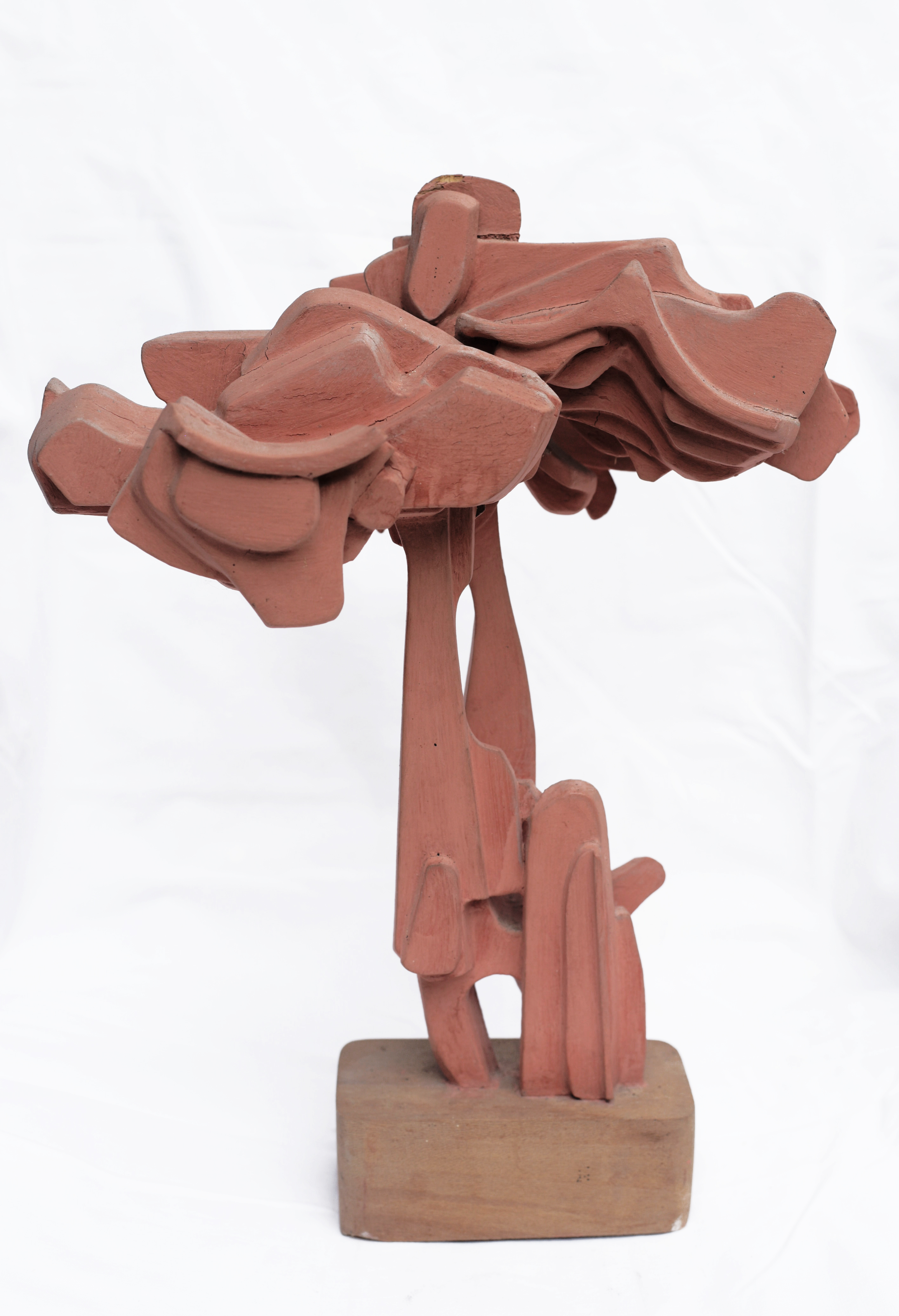
A sculpture by A. Stanevičius

He adapted instruments and techniques from his dental practice for artistic use, employing dental drills to engrave copper and plaster and mould-making methods to produce decorative objects and commemorative medals. In 1976, he attended workshops led by Oskar Fernandez at the San Francisco de Asís art institute in Montevideo, where he studied engraving and screen printing.

Lithuanian architecture was another recurring subject. His prints depicted Vilnius, its churches and historic streets, using books, postcards and photographs as references. Although he never visited Lithuania, he maintained an interest in the country's cultural heritage through correspondence and materials received from relatives and Lithuanian representatives.

Stanevičius also designed covers for publications and recordings associated with the Lithuanian diaspora. Among these was Šeštoji diena, a 1974 poetry collection by Marija Saulaitytė published in London by Nida.

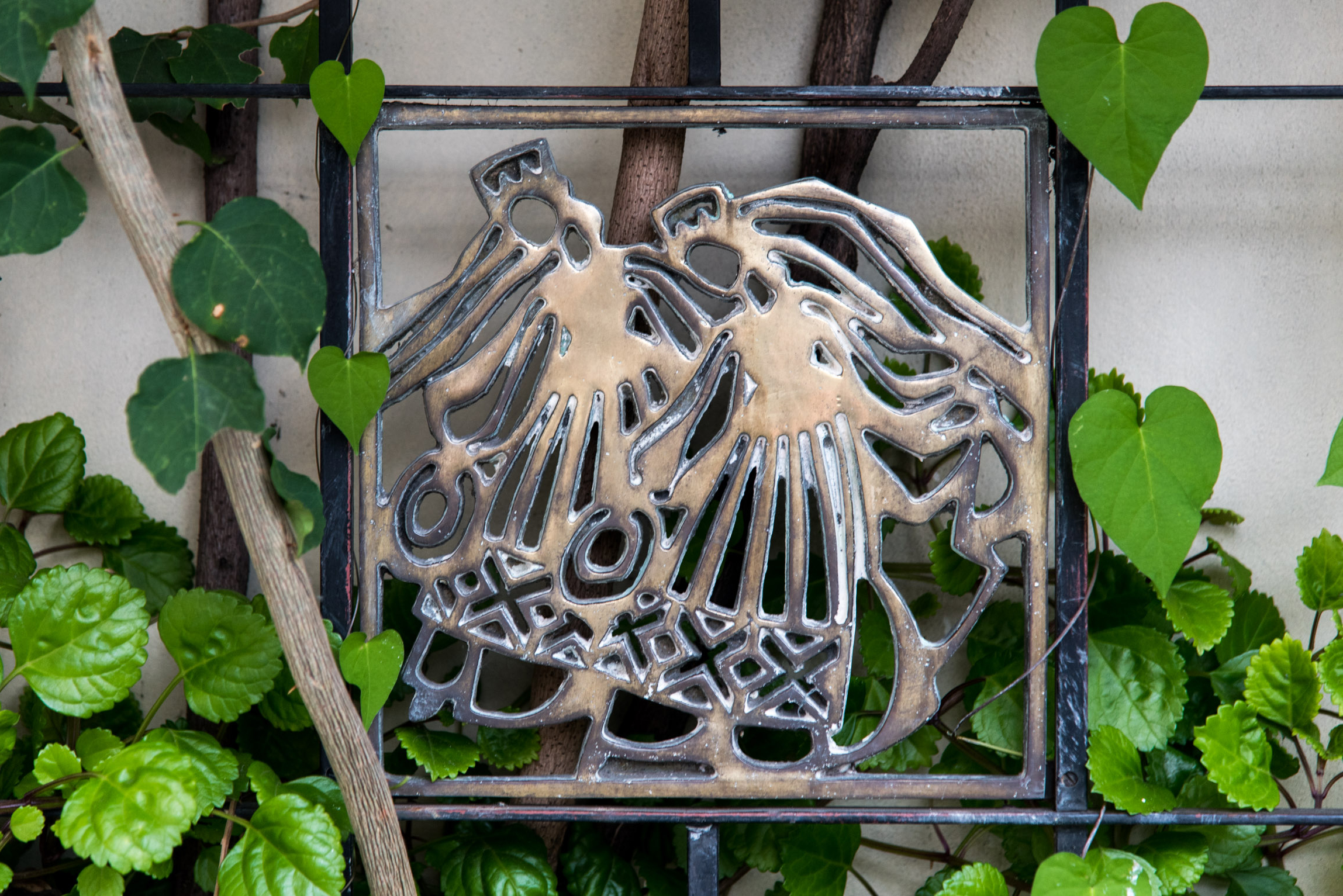
Artworks of A. Stanevičius. Argentina

== Exhibitions ==
Stanevičius exhibited his work in Uruguay and abroad, including in Argentina, Brazil, Canada, the United States and Europe. His exhibitions included a 1983 presentation at the Ote Roots gallery in Chicago and a March 1984 exhibition at the American Art Circle in Punta del Este, Uruguay.

In 1996, he participated in an exhibition organized by the Uruguayan Ministry of Foreign Affairs, where his wooden Nativity scene received an award for the best work. According to research by Vaida Jonušytė, the sculpture was subsequently presented to the Vatican. His work was also included in Tarp uostų (Between Ports), a 2016 exhibition in Lithuania featuring artists of Lithuanian descent from Uruguay.

== Lithuanian cultural activities ==
In addition to his artistic work, Stanevičius participated in the Lithuanian cultural community in Uruguay. In 1968, he became director of Gintaras, a Lithuanian folk-dance ensemble based in Montevideo's Cerro district. He later founded another ensemble, Ąžuolynas, which toured Lithuanian communities in the United States in 1980.

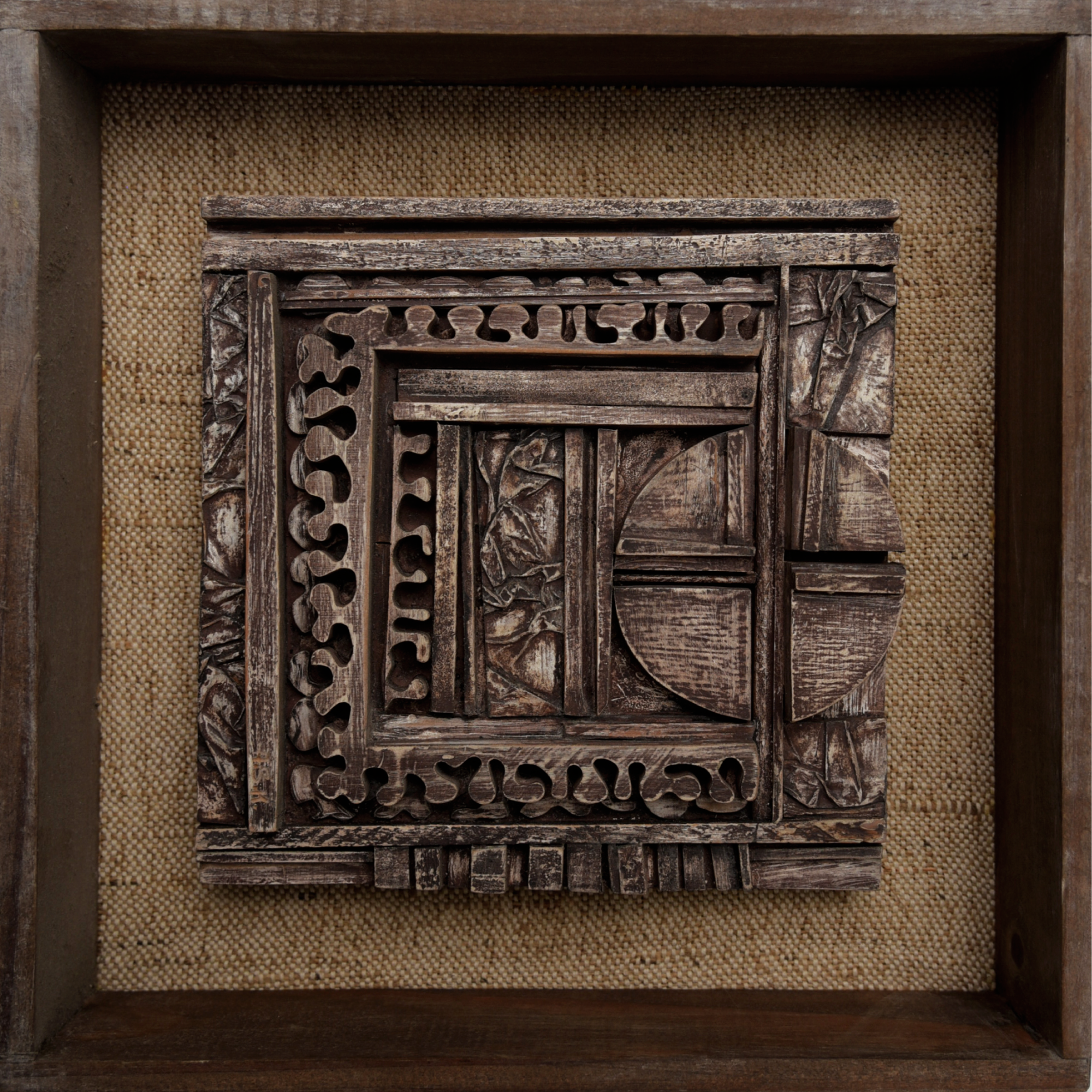
A painting by A. Stanevičius

Stanevičius collaborated with Lithuanian-Uruguayan weaver and musician Vytautas Dorelis in designing and producing Lithuanian national costumes. Dorelis wove the fabrics, while Stanevičius developed the designs, patterns and colour schemes. Their costumes were used by Lithuanian dance ensembles in South America, North America and Australia.

The two introduced brighter colours into their designs than were customary in traditional Lithuanian dress. Some members of the Lithuanian community criticized this approach, while Stanevičius maintained that the colours made the costumes more distinctive on stage. Over approximately three decades, the collaborators produced more than 300 complete national costumes.

Stanevičius also lectured on Lithuanian history, folklore, art and national identity. In 1981, his essay Tautinės sąmonės ugdymas išeivijoje (Developing National Consciousness in the Diaspora) appeared in the Lithuanian cultural journal Aidai.

== Legacy ==
Stanevičius died in 2006. A bench bearing his name was installed at the Church of Our Lady of Fátima, associated with Montevideo's Lithuanian community.

In 2019, archival materials relating to the Lithuanian diaspora in Uruguay, including documents concerning Stanevičius, were transferred to the Lithuanian Archives of Literature and Art. His life and work were subsequently examined in a 2020 study by archivist Vaida Jonušytė, published in Oikos: Lithuanian Migration and Diaspora Studies.
