= Laudenbach =

Laudenbach is a German name originally meaning "loud stream". It may refer to:

== Places ==
- Laudenbach, Bavaria, a town in Lower Franconia, Bavaria, Germany (postcode 63925)
- Laudenbach, Karlstadt, a village in Lower Franconia, Bavaria, Germany (postcode 97753)
- Laudenbach (Rhein-Neckar), a town in Baden-Württemberg, Germany (postcode 96514)
- Laudenbach (Weikersheim), a subdivision of Weikersheim, a town in Baden-Württemberg, Germany (postcode 97990)
- Ober-Laudenbach, a municipality of the town of Heppenheim in the state of Hesse, Germany (postcode 64646)

== Rivers ==
- Laudenbach (Gelster), a river of Hesse, Germany, tributary of the Gelster
- Kleiner Laudenbach, a river of Bavaria, Germany

== People with the surname ==
- Philippe Laudenbach (1936-2024), French actor
- Pierre Jules Louis Laudenbach (1897–1975), better known as Pierre Fresnay, French stage and film actor
- Roland Laudenbach (1921–1991), French writer, editor, journalist, literary critic and scenarist
- Georg Karl Ignaz von Fechenbach zu Laudenbach (1749–1808), last Prince-Bishop of Würzburg, an ecclesiastical principality of the Holy Roman Empire

== See also ==
- Lautenbach (disambiguation)
- Lauterbach (disambiguation)
