= Göttelbach =

River in Germany

Location
- Country: Germany
- States: Baden-Württemberg

Physical characteristics
- Mouth
  - location: Schiltach
  - coordinates: 48.2279°N 8.3840°E
- Length: 4.5 km (2.8 mi)

Basin features
- Progression: Schiltach→ Kinzig→ Rhine→ North Sea

Göttelbach is a river of Baden-Württemberg, Germany. It flows into the Schiltach in Schramberg.

== See also ==
- List of rivers of Baden-Württemberg
