= Lauterbach (surname) =

Lauterbach (German pronunciation: [ˈlaʊtɐbax]) is a German surname. Notable people with the surname include:

- Ann Lauterbach (born 1942), American poet, essayist, and professor
- Carl Adolf Georg Lauterbach (1864–1937), German explorer and botanist
- Davy Lauterbach (born 1972), painter, poet, and television director
- Edward Lauterbach (1844–1923), American political functionary
- Heiner Lauterbach (born 1953), German actor
- Henry Lauterbach (born 1957), East German track and field athlete and Olympic competitor
- Jacob Zallel Lauterbach (1873–1942), American Judaica scholar and author
- Josefine Lauterbach (1909–1972), Austrian middle-distance runner
- Karl Lauterbach (born 1963), German scientist and politician
- Maria Lauterbach (1987–2007), U.S. Marines Lance Corporal (see Murder of Maria Lauterbach)
- Richard Lauterbach (fl. World War II era), American TIME magazine Moscow bureau chief during World War II

== See also ==
- Lauterbach (disambiguation)
