= Lauterbach (Schiltach) =

River in Germany

Location
- Country: Germany
- States: Baden-Württemberg

Physical characteristics
- Mouth
  - location: Schiltach
  - coordinates: 48.2236°N 8.3842°E

Basin features
- Progression: Schiltach→ Kinzig→ Rhine→ North Sea

Lauterbach (German pronunciation: [ˈlaʊtɐbax]) is a river of Baden-Württemberg, Germany. It flows into the Schiltach in Schramberg.

== See also ==
- List of rivers of Baden-Württemberg
