= Lautenbach =

Lautenbach is a German name originally meaning "loud stream". It may refer to:

== Rivers ==
- Lautenbach (Linzer Aach), a river of Baden-Württemberg, Germany, tributary of the Linzer Aach
- Lautenbach (Ablach), a river of Baden-Württemberg, Germany, tributary of the Ablach

== Places ==
- Lautenbach (Ortenaukreis), a municipality in the district Ortenau (Ortenaukreis), Baden-Württemberg, Germany
- Lautenbach, Haut-Rhin, a commune in the administrative region Grand Est, France
- Lautenbach (Gernsbach), a village incorporated into Gernsbach in Baden-Württemberg, Germany

== People ==
- Manegold of Lautenbach (c. 1030–c. 1103), religious and polemical writer and Augustinian canon from Alsace
- Wilhelm Lautenbach (1891–1948), German official at the Economics Ministry at the beginning of the 1920s
- Walt Lautenbach (1922–1997), American National Basketball Association player

== See also ==
- Laudenbach (disambiguation)
- Lauterbach (disambiguation)
