= Pensive Christ of Seeberg =

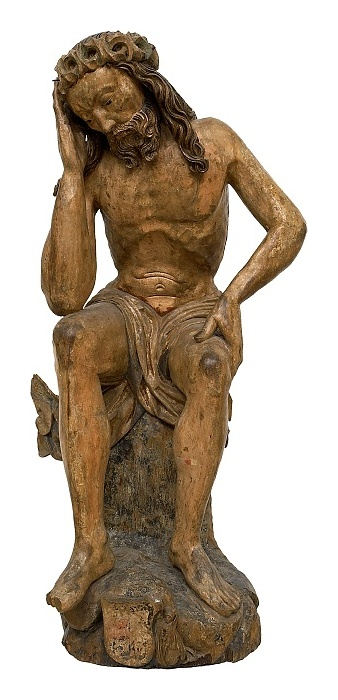
Pensive Christ of Seeberg (around 1509)

The Pensive Christ of Seeberg with a donor from the Zedtwitz family (around 1509) is one of four statues of the same subject in the Cheb collections. The author was probably the anonymous Master of the Madonna of Kamenná Street, whose large carving workshop was based in Cheb; the works from it have an unmistakable handwriting. The statue is on loan to the Gallery of Fine Arts in Cheb from the Františkovy Lázně City Museum.

== History of the work ==
The statue was found in the interior of the castle church of St. Wolfgang in Seeberg. It may have come to the church of St. Wolfgang only secondarily, e.g. from Libá or Neuberg near Aš, which belonged to the Zedtwitz family. The donor was most likely Magdalena Sack von Mühldorf, the second wife of Veith von Zedwitz at Neuberg near Aš, who died in 1509.

== Description and classification ==
Fully sculpted wooden statue 132 x 69 x 53 cm, worked on the back, with remnants of the original polychromy, inv. no. S 83. The toes of the right foot and most of the thorns in the crown of thorns are missing. At the feet of Christ there is a coat of arms, identified according to the preserved paint remains as the coat of arms of the Zedtwitz family. Next to the coat of arms is a small kneeling figure of the donor with her head covered with a widow's cap, holding a large rosary in her clasped hands. Restored by B. Zemánek (1974) and J. Živný (1986).

Christ is seated on a green rock, with his right hand resting on his knee, supporting his head. The composition is balanced by his left hand, which is resting on his thigh. His gaze is directed towards the pedestal where the kneeling donor is depicted. The anatomy of the nude body with muscles and bones indicated is superficial and the volume is rather wide. The triangular face with a broad forehead and a strong nose is framed by a beard and long strands of hair. The execution of the details corresponds to the Cheb workshop, formerly associated with the Master of the Madonna of Kamenná Street. The hallmarks of the workshop include the wider, unarched nails overlapping fingertips on the hands and feet, the sculptural contours of the eyes and the characteristic hair carving.

Three other statues of Pensive Christ come from the same workshop and follow the same scheme. Ševčíková connected these works with the so-called Master of Lamentation from Ostroh, but according to Vykoukal, there is no reason to do so, because the relief of Lamentation itself is a lower quality carving of average workmanship compared to the statue of the Pensive Christ of Seeberg.

Most of the statues of the Pensive Christ were made around 1500 and in the first quarter of the 16th century, on the eve of the Reformation. Most of them are preserved in the area of northwest Bohemia and Saxony, which were strongly affected by the Reformation. Christ is depicted at a specific moment of his earthly suffering, when he rests while dragging the cross on the way to Golgotha. He is thus presented to the believer in his human nature and invites him to contemplation.

=== Similar works ===
- The Pensive Christ of Horní Lomany
- The Pensive Christ of Aš
- The Pensive Christ (from the Church of St. Wenceslas, Dominican monastery in Cheb?)
- The Pensive Christ from Chlum nad Ohří (private property)
- Crucified from Pomezí, Church of St. James the Greater, Cheb (the work has been missing since World War II)[5]
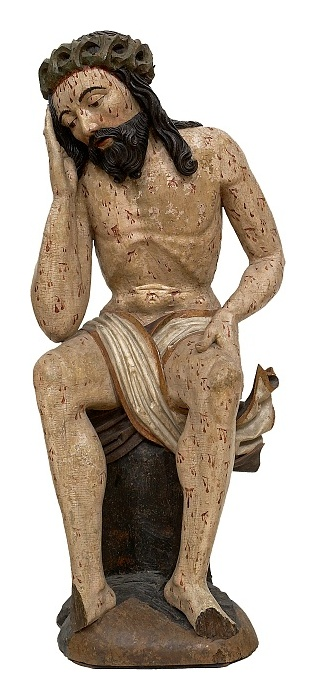
Pensive Christ, Cheb (early 16th century)

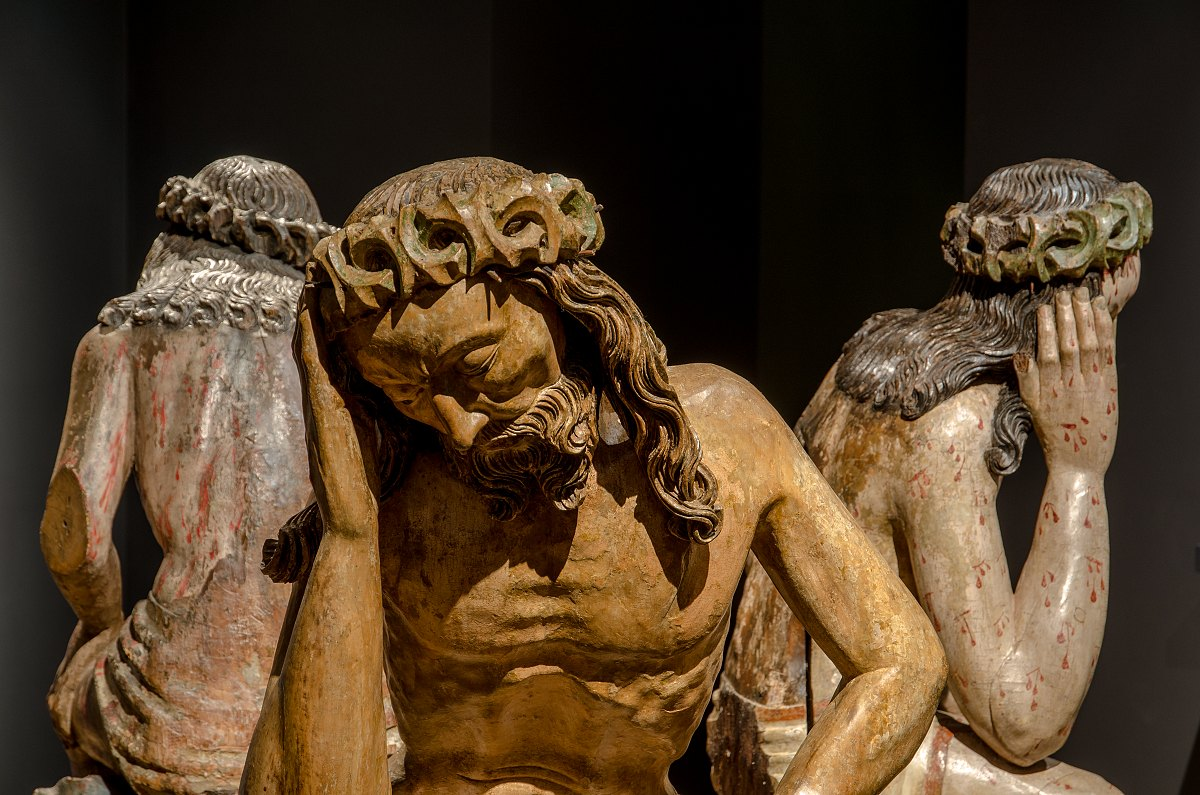
Statues of the Pensive Christ, Gallery of Fine Arts in Cheb

== Sources ==
- Jiří Vykoukal (ed.), Gothic Art in the Cheb Region, Gallery of Fine Arts in Cheb 2009, ISBN 978-80-85016-92-5
- Marion Tietz-Strödel, Die Plastik in Eger von den frühen Gotik bis zur Renaissance, in. Stadt und Land, Wien, München 1992, pp. 277-278
- Jana Ševčíková, Cheb Gothic Sculpture, Gallery of Fine Arts in Cheb 1975
