= Karlstadt, Germany =

- Town
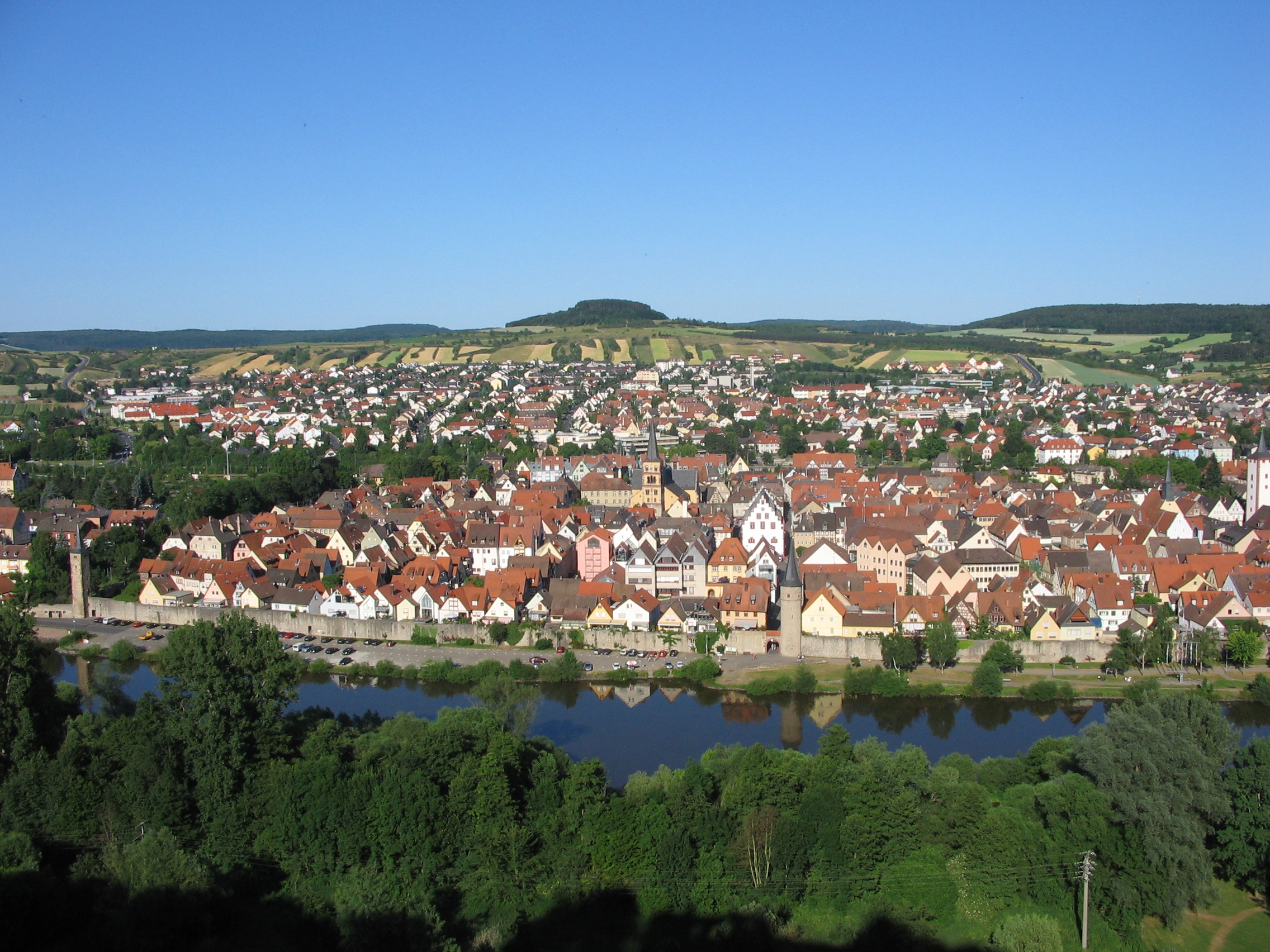
- Old town of Karlstadt with the new building area at the Saupurzel in the background

- Coat of arms

- Location of Karlstadt, Germany within Main-Spessart district
- Interactive map of Karlstadt, Germany
- Location within Germany Location within Bavaria
- Coordinates: 49°57′37″N 9°46′20″E
- Country: Germany
- State: Bavaria
- Admin. region: Unterfranken
- District: Main-Spessart
- Subdivisions: 10 Ortsteile

Government
  - Mayor (2020–32): Michael Hombach (CSU)

Area
  - Total: 98.15 km^{2} (37.90 sq mi)
- Elevation: 163 m (535 ft)

Population (2025-12-31)
  - Total: 14,719
  - Density: 150.0/km^{2} (388.4/sq mi)
- Time zone: UTC+01:00 (CET)
  - Summer (DST): UTC+02:00 (CEST)
- Postal codes: 97753
- Dialling codes: 09353, 09359 (Rohrbach)
- Vehicle registration: MSP
- Website: www.karlstadt.de

Karlstadt (German pronunciation: [ˈkaʁlʃtat]), also called Karlstadt am Main, is a town in the Main-Spessart in the Regierungsbezirk of Lower Franconia (Unterfranken) in Bavaria, Germany. It is the administrative centre (Kreisstadt) of Main-Spessart district, and has a population of around 15,000.

== Geography ==
Karlstadt lies on the River Main in the district (Landkreis) of Main-Spessart, roughly 25 km north of the city of Würzburg. It belongs to the Main-Franconian wine-growing region. The town itself is located on the right bank of the river, but the municipal territory extends to the left bank.

Since the amalgamations in 1978, Karlstadt's Stadtteile have been Gambach, Heßlar, Karlburg, Karlstadt, Laudenbach, Mühlbach, Rohrbach, Stadelhofen, Stetten, and Wiesenfeld.

== History ==
From the late 6th to the mid-13th century, the settlement of Karlburg with its monastery and harbor was located on the west bank of the Main. It grew up around the Karlsburg, a castle perched high over the community, that was destroyed in the German Peasants' War in 1525.

In 1202, Karlstadt itself was founded by Konrad von Querfurt, Bishop of Würzburg. The town was methodically laid out with a nearly rectangular plan to defend Würzburg territory against the Counts of Rieneck. The plan is still well preserved today. The streets in the old town are laid out much like a chessboard, but for military reasons they are not quite straight.

In 1225, Karlstadt had its first documentary mention. In 1236, the castle and the village of Karlburg were destroyed in the Rieneck Feud. In 1244, winegrowing in Karlstadt was mentioned for the first time. From 1277 comes the earliest evidence of the town seal. In 1304, the town fortifications were finished. The parish of Karlstadt was first named in 1339. In 1369 a hospital was founded. Between 1370 and 1515, remodelling work was being done on the first, Romanesque parish church to turn it into a Gothic hall church. About 1400, Karlstadt became for a short time the seat of an episcopal mint. The former Oberamt of the Princely Electorate (Hochstift) of Würzburg was, after Secularization, in Bavaria's favour, passed in 1805 to Grand Duke Ferdinando III of Tuscany to form the Grand Duchy of Würzburg, and passed with this to the Kingdom of Bavaria.

The Jewish residents of the town had a synagogue as early as the Middle Ages. The town's synagogue was destroyed on Kristallnacht (the Night of Broken Glass, 9 November 1938) by Nazi SA men, SS, and Hitler Youth, as well as other local residents. Its destruction is recalled by a plaque at the synagogue's former site. The homes of Jewish residents were attacked as well, the possessions therein were looted or brought to the square in front of the town hall where they were burned, and the Jews living in the town were beaten.

== Governance ==
The mayor of Karlstadt is Michael Hombach (CSU), elected in 2020 and re-elected in 2026.

The council is made up of 24 council members, excluding the mayor.

	CSU	SPD	Grüne	FWG	Die Linke / Die PARTEI	Total
2002	10	7	2	5	—	24 seats
2008	8	6	3	7	—	24 seats
2014	8	5	5	6	—	24 seats
2020	8	4	5	6	1	24 seats
2026	9	4	5	6	—	24 seats

(as of 8 March 2026)

The town's coat of arms might be described thus: Quarterly, first and fourth azure, second and third argent a fleur-de-lis gules. The town's earliest seal, from 1277, showed an effigy of Charlemagne (German: Karl der Große), who is said to have founded and named the town. The next seal after this one also bore Charlemagne's likeness, and this appeared on town seals until the 18th century. However, in 1544 the town began using a quartered shield as its arms. This is thought to have come from the banner of state borne by the Prince-Bishopric (Hochstift) of Würzburg, to which the town once belonged. The fleurs-de-lis were added in the early 19th century, and they refer to Charlemagne.

== Transport ==
Karlstadt lies at the junction of two Bundesstraßen, the B 26 and the B 27. On two road bridges, the Old Main Bridge (Alte Mainbrücke) built in 1953 and the more northerly New Main Bridge (Neue Mainbrücke) built in 2005, the river Main can be crossed.

Through the municipal area runs the Hanover-Würzburg high-speed rail line, north-south. Within the municipal territory lie a section of the Mühlberg Tunnel and part of the Nantenbach Curve.

Karlstadt has a small airfield east of the town.

== Economy ==
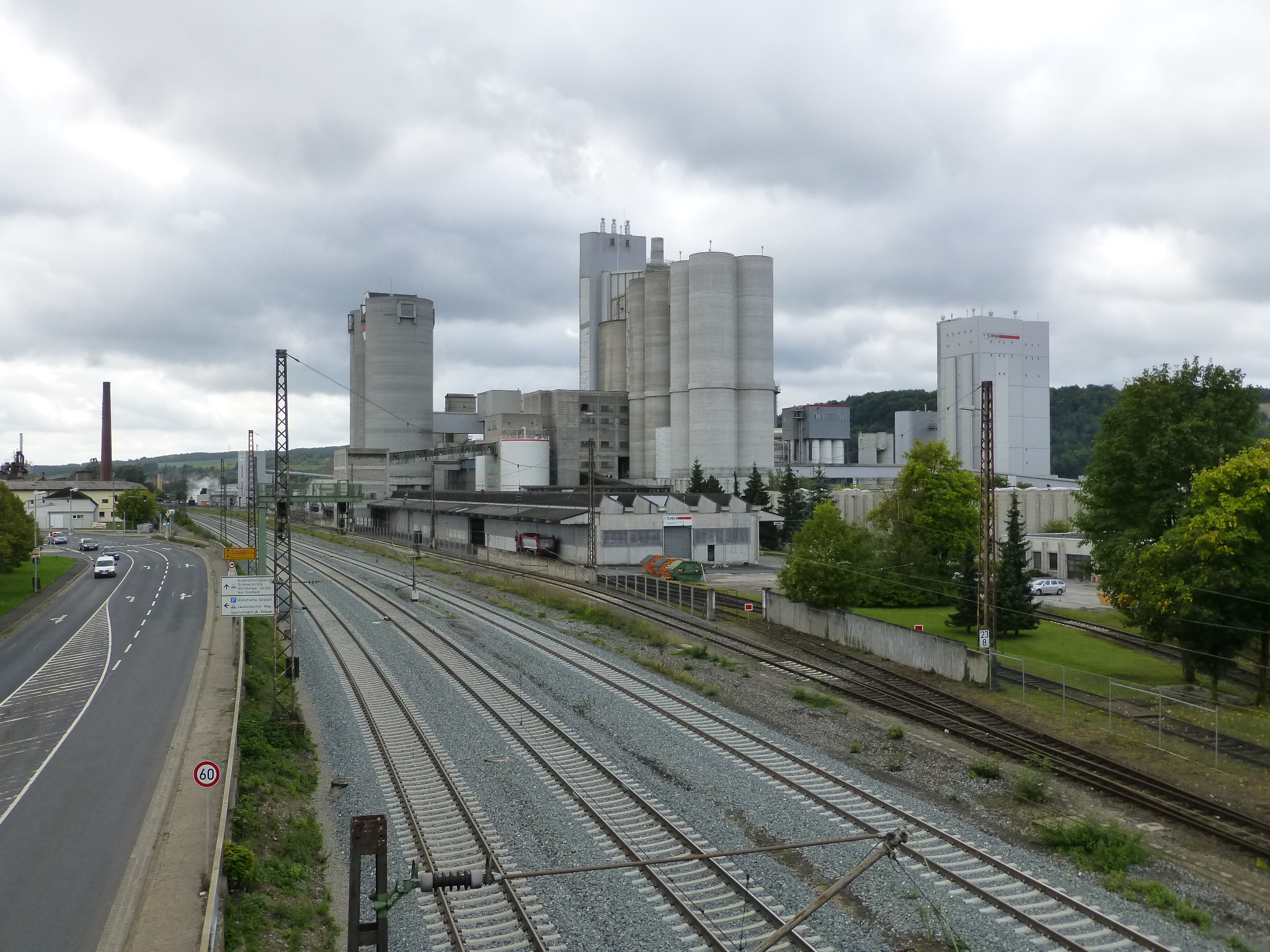
Industry south of Karlstadt

Local industry includes Düker Ironworks, the Schwenk Cement Works, and the Kohl Wood Veneer Factory. Besides these three large industrial plants, many handicraft businesses have also set up shop in Karlstadt. Another big employer is the Main-Spessart Landratsamt (district administration). Many inhabitants commute to Würzburg, 25 km away, or Lohr am Main, 18 km away.

Winegrowing has only a small economic importance nowadays, but still has great cultural significance. Vineyards in Karlstadt are the Roßtal and Im Stein. There are also others in centres, especially in Stetten (Stettener Stein) and on the way from the main town out to Gambach.

== Education ==
The following institutions exists in Karlstadt: several kindergartens, five primary schools, one gymnasium, one Realschule, and "Piranha" youth cultural centre.

== Notable people ==
- Johannes Schöner (1477–1547), mathematician, geographer, cartographer, astronomer and astrologist
- Andreas Bodenstein (c. 1482–1541), Protestant Reformer
- Johann Rudolph Glauber (1604–1670), apothecary and chemist
- Franz Sperr (1878–1945), member of the German resistance to Nazism
- Ruth Westheimer (1928–2024), German-American sex therapist, talk show host and author
- Roland Büchner (born 1954), choirmaster of the Regensburger Domspatzen

== Gallery ==
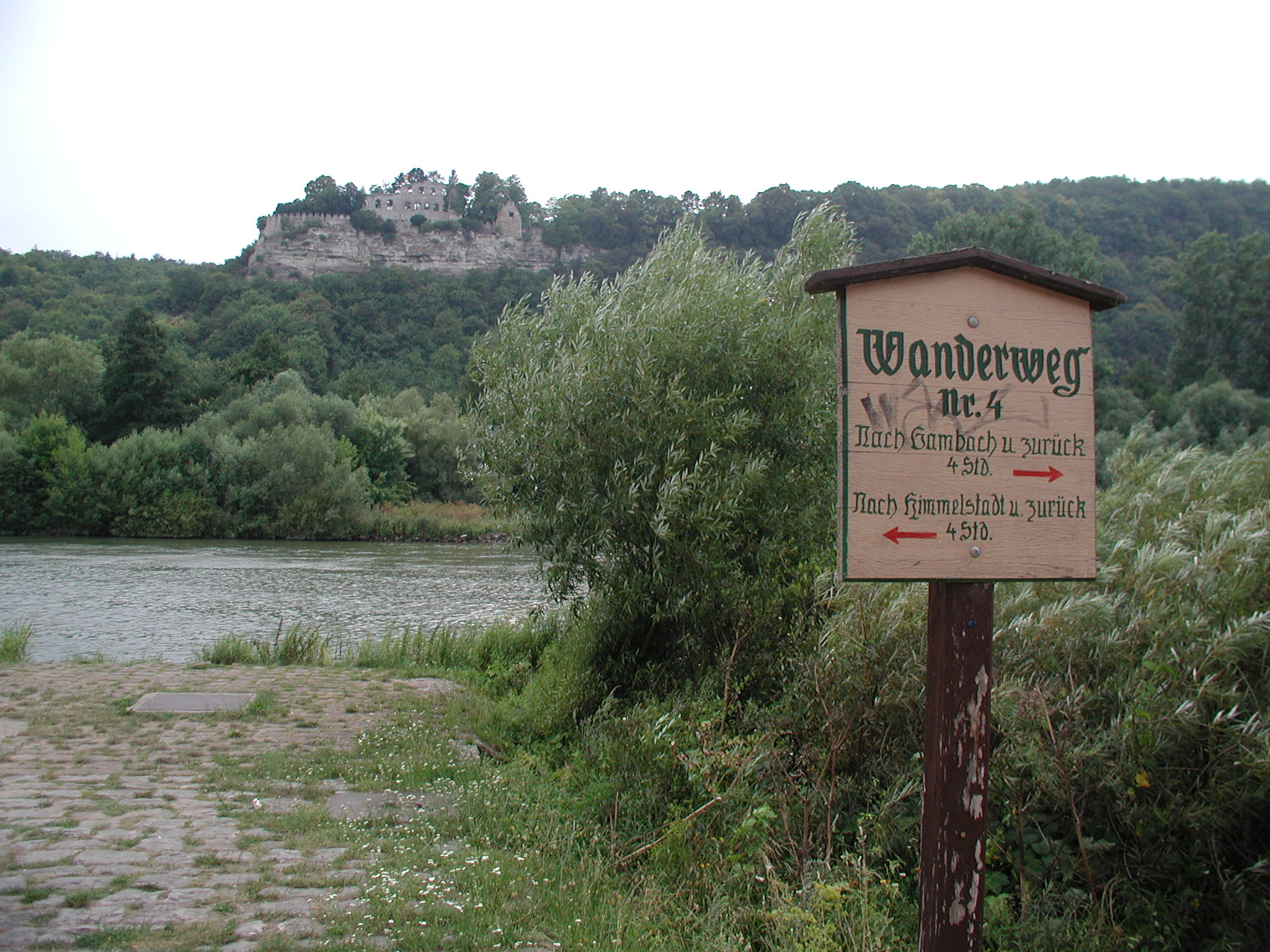
Karlsburg, Karlstadt, on the west bank of the Main

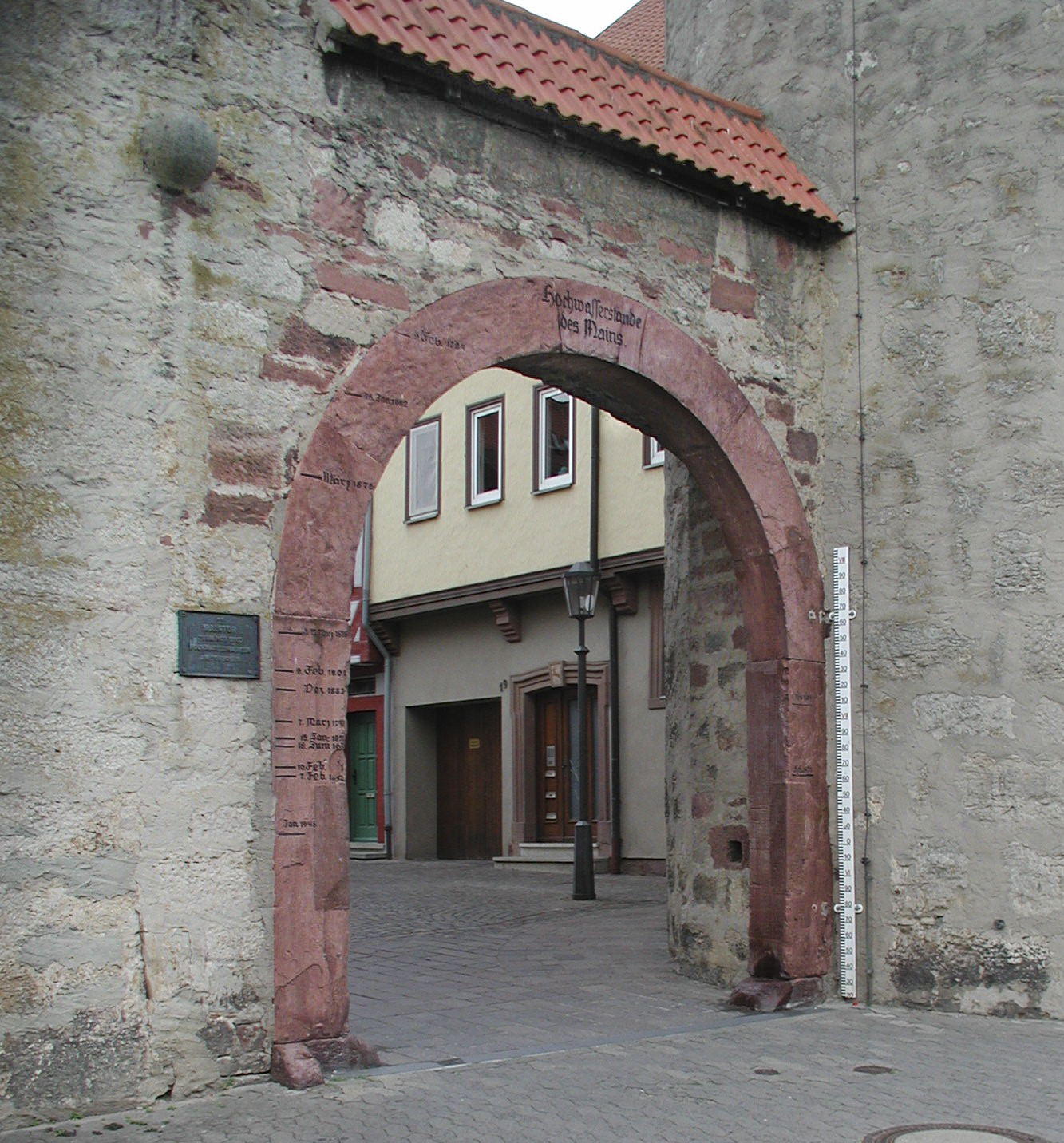
Main gate with flood gauge, Karlstadt

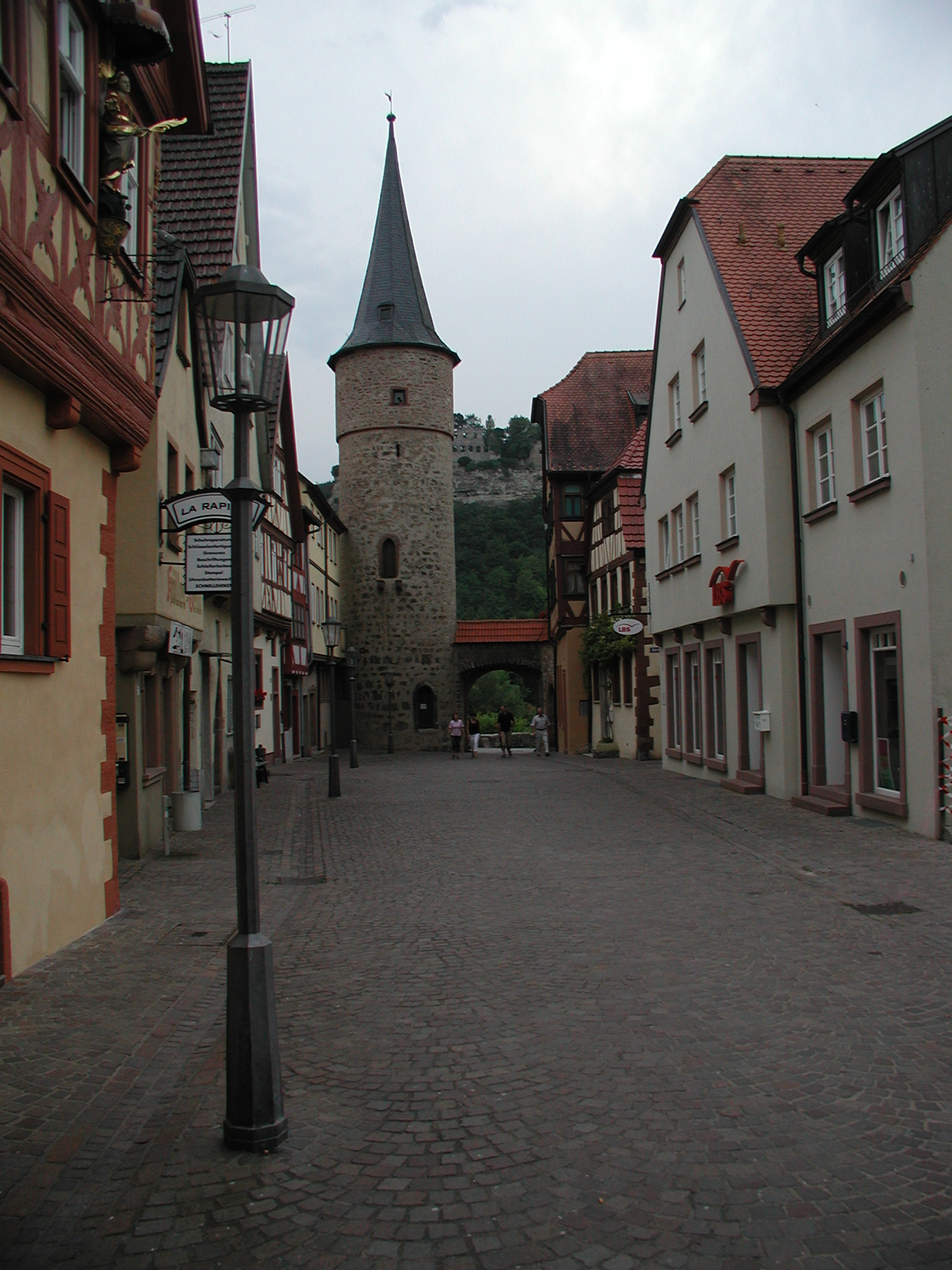
Main gate tower and main gate, Karlstadt

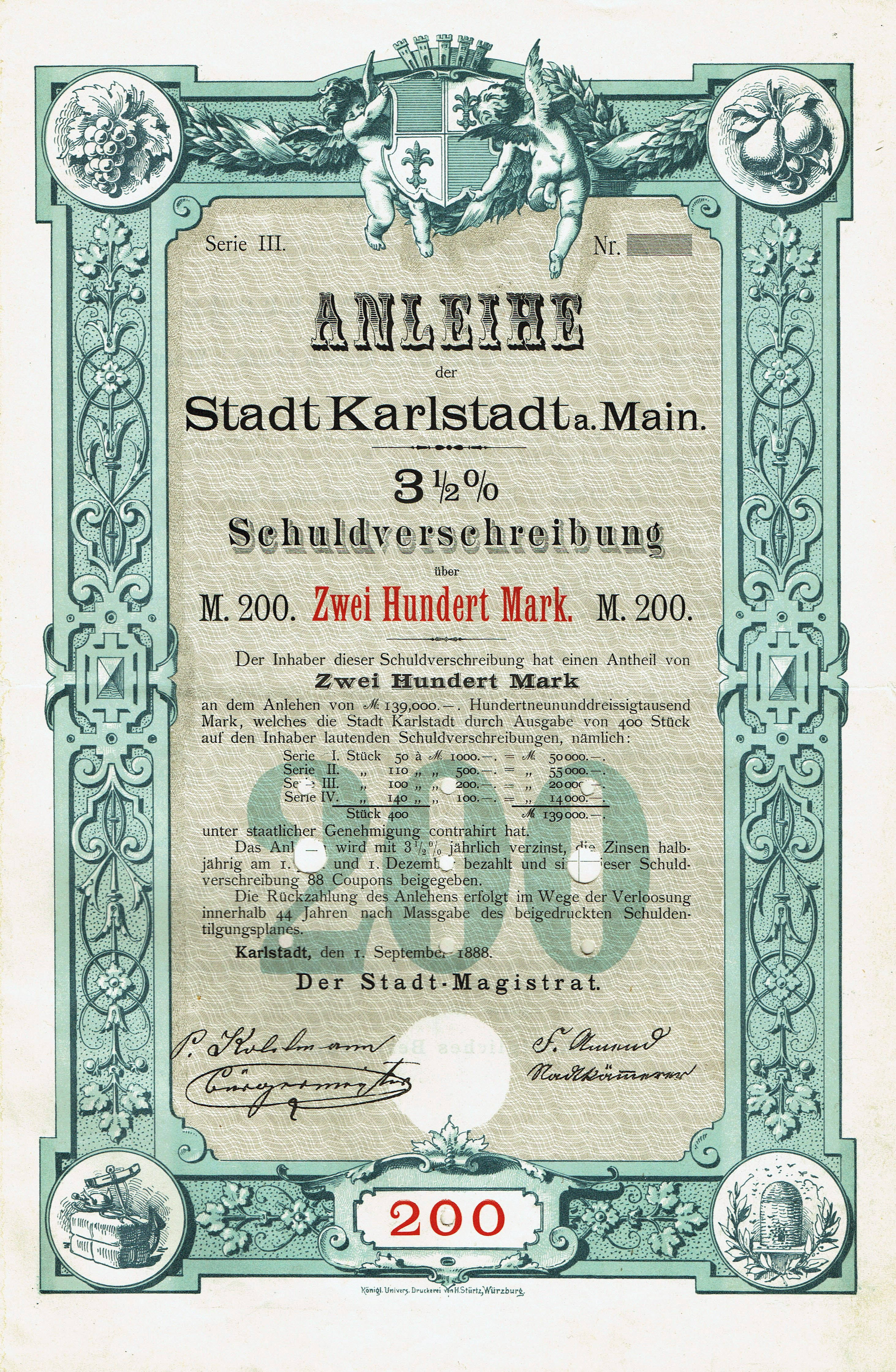
Bond of the town of Karlstadt am Main, issued 1 September 1888
