= Brixen (disambiguation) =

Brixen is the name of two cities in the Alps:

- Brixen, South Tyrol, Italy
- Brixen im Thale, Tyrol, Austria

Brixen may also refer to:

- Bishopric of Brixen, the former north-Italian state.
