= Lauterbach Stradivarius =

Violin made by Antonio Stradivari

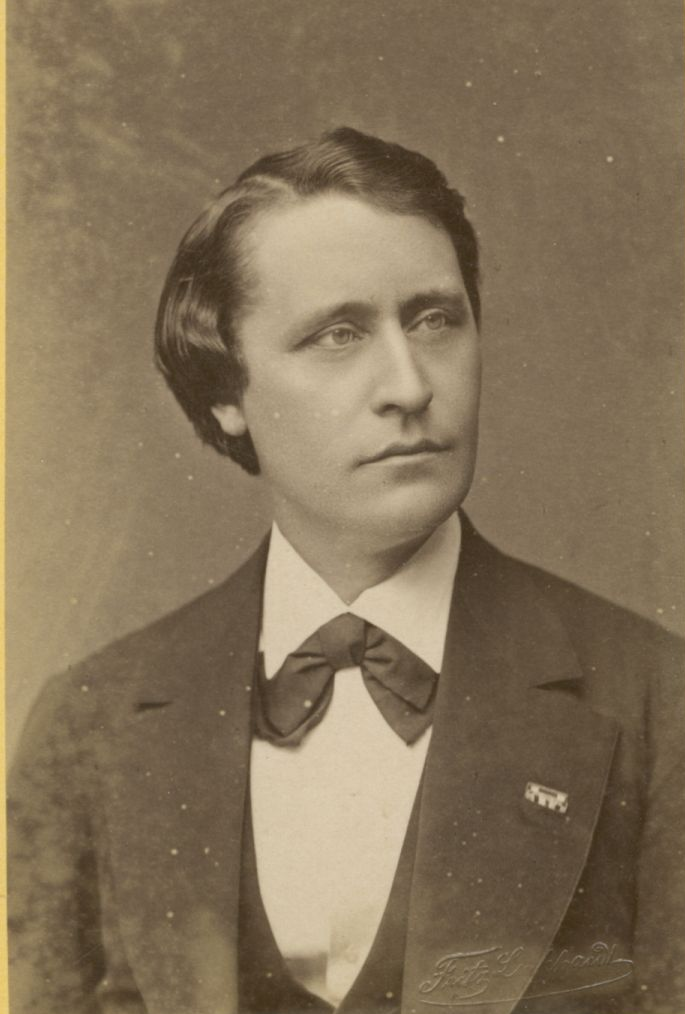
Portrait of Johann Christoph Lauterbach

The Lauterbach Stradivarius of 1719 is an antique violin fabricated by Italian luthier, Antonio Stradivari of Cremona (1644–1737). The instrument derives its name from previous owner, German virtuoso, Johann Christoph Lauterbach.

== History of owners ==
Composer and violinist Charles Philippe Lafont owned the violin. On his death, the violin was acquired by luthier and expert Jean-Baptiste Vuillaume. Vuillaume sold the violin to Johann Christoph Lauterbach.

Polish textile manufacturer Henryk Grohman acquired the violin in 1900. Upon his death in 1939, he bequeathed his entire art collection to the Polish state. The violin was exhibited in the National Museum of Warsaw. In 1944, it was allegedly stolen by a German Major Theodor Blank. Blank reportedly sent the violin to his wife in Germany, where it was possibly recovered in 1948 by U.S. military police. It was not returned to Poland.

In 2022, a violin was claimed to have been identified to be the Lauterbach Stradivarius in France by experts from the Musique et Spoliations organization, according to a news article from Le Parisien.

== See also ==
- Stradivarius
