= Laudenbach, Karlstadt =

Laudenbach (German pronunciation: [ˈlaʊdn̩bax]) is a village in the Main-Spessart district of Lower Franconia, Bavaria, Germany, which belongs to the town of Karlstadt am Main. Laudenbach is situated opposite Karlstadt, on the left bank of the Main, but was incorporated into the town administratively in 1978. The postcode is 97753.

Laudenbach is attested historically from 1113. Around 1150 a defensive castle was built above the village, two towers of which can still be seen. The castle was destroyed in 1525, in the peasant's revolt, and subsequently the local peasants were required by way of reparation to build the new castle, a renaissance-style building near the river.

Laudenbach used to have a significant Jewish community, who settled there at the time when the castle belonged to the Dukes of Wertheim. In 1794, a synagogue was built in Bandwörthstraße. It was trashed in 1938 as part of the November pogrom, but there are plans to reopen it to the public. On the hill above the castle there is a Jewish cemetery, which was created around 1600 as a shared graveyard for 14 different Jewish communities in Mainfranken, including Adelsberg and Veitshöchheim. It was damaged in the final years of the second world war, but the Americans forced the local people to repair it.
