= Henryk Grohman =

Polish businessman

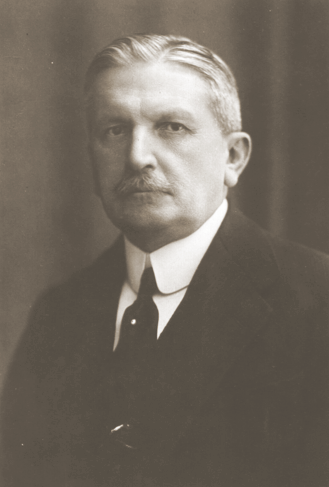
Henryk Grohman

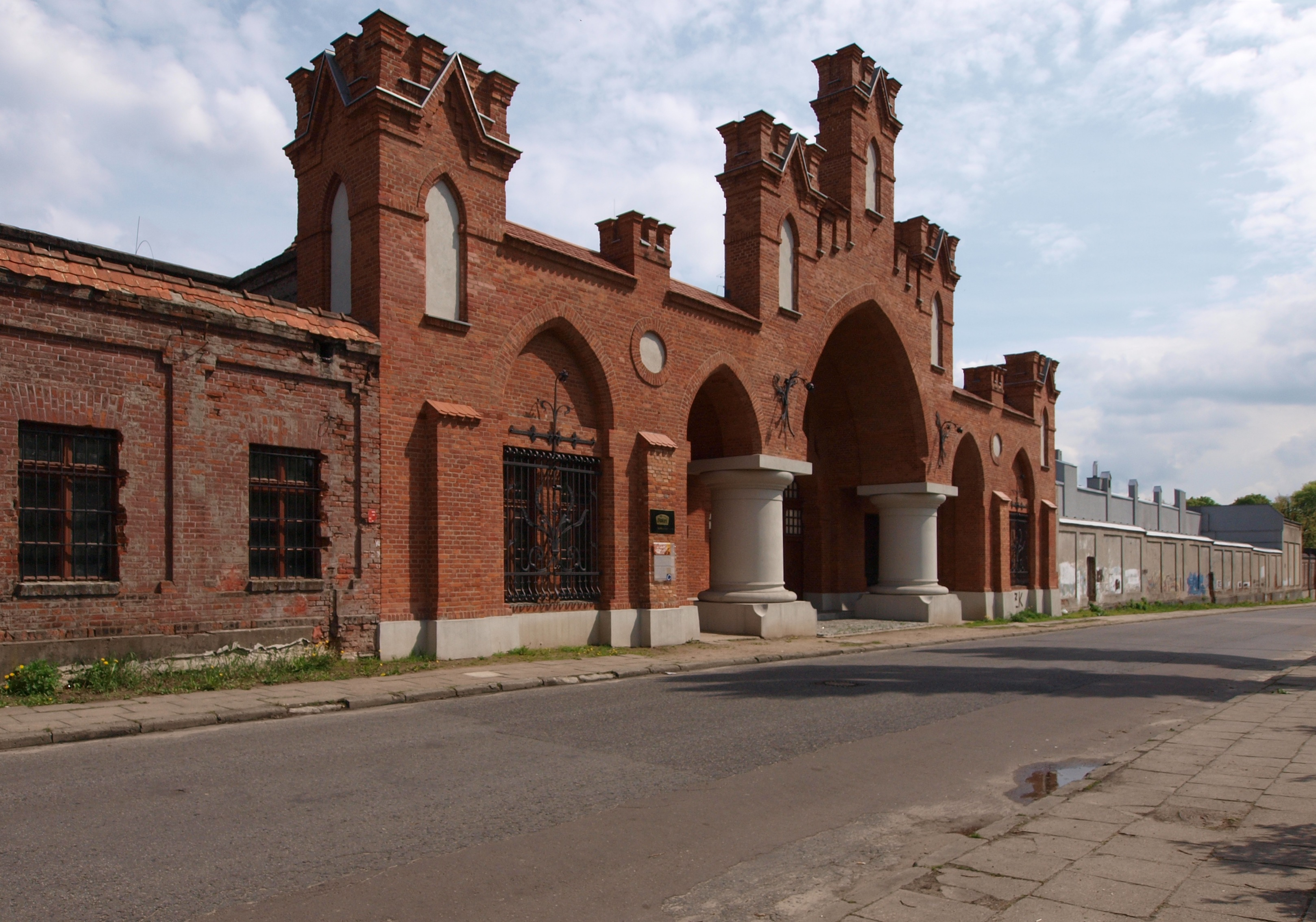
The Grohman factory gate (2010)

Henryk Grohman (1862–1939) was a Polish industrialist of German descent.

== Biography ==
Born in Łódź, he was the son of Ludwik Grohman, who participated in the manufacturing of a cotton plant with his own father, Traugott Grohmann. Henryk Grohman built upon his father's legacy and enlarged the plant, which became a modern textile factory.

Grohman studied in Great Britain and Switzerland.

== Patron of the arts ==
Henryk Grohman built a villa in 1892, designed by Hilary Majewski, which became a centre of culture for Łódź. Music concerts took place in the villa, while artists such as writer Henryk Sienkiewicz and composer Ignacy Paderewski were hosted there.

Grohman was an avid art collector, and items in his possession included a 1734 Guarneri violin and the Lauterbach Stradivarius, which he often played himself.

His entire estate was bequeathed to the Polish state.
