= Pensive Christ =

Subject in Christian iconography

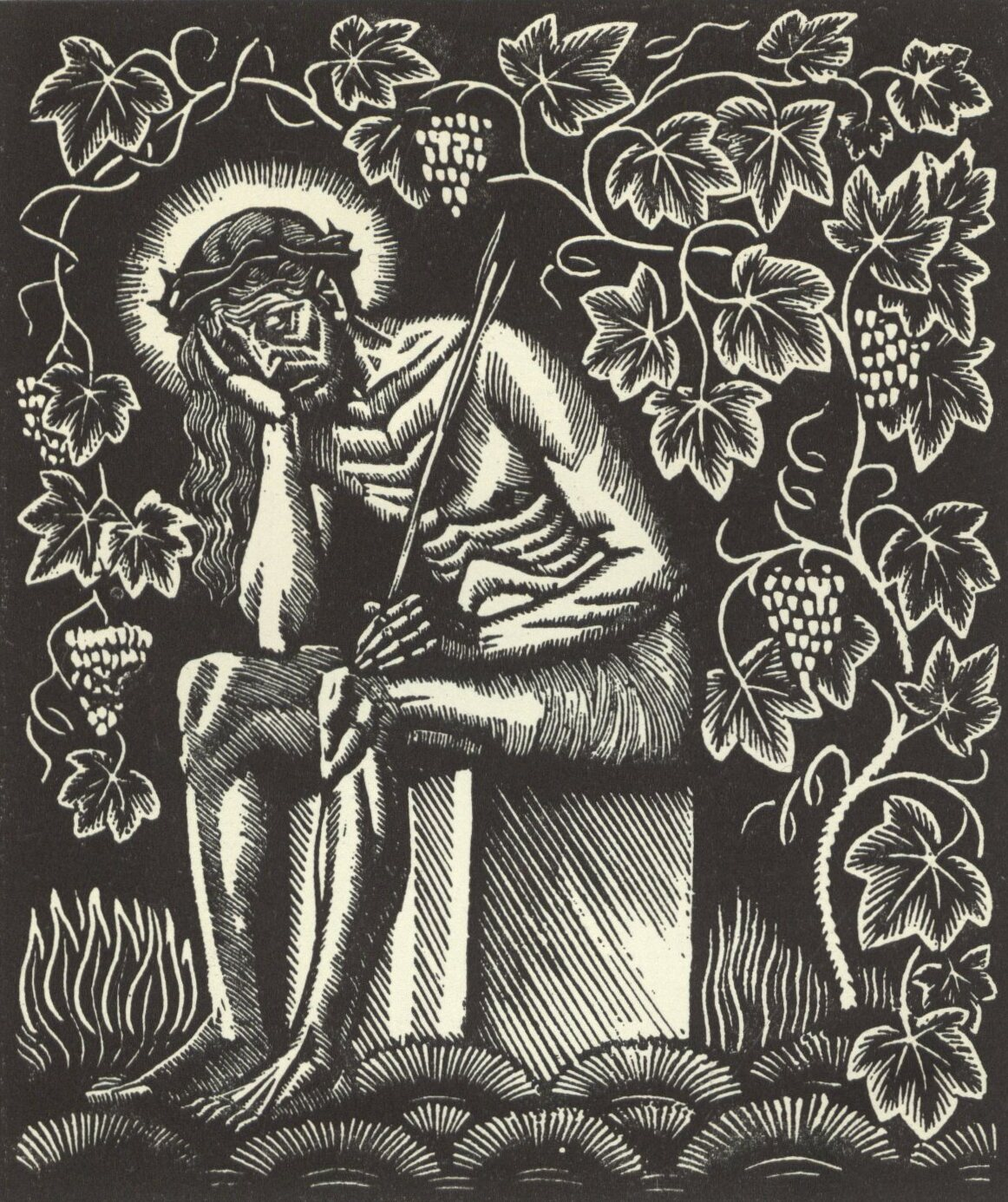
"Pensive Christ" (Chrystus Frasobliwy) by Władysław Skoczylas

The Pensive Christ (German: Christus im Elend – 'Christ in Distress' or Christus in der Rast; Polish: Chrystus Frasobliwy – 'Worried Christ'; Lithuanian: Rūpintojėlis) is a subject in Christian iconography depicting a contemplating Jesus, sitting with his head supported by his hand with the Crown of Thorns and marks of his flagellation. It is, therefore, a picture of Jesus shortly before his crucifixion, although more an andachtsbild or devotional subject than intended to show an actual moment in the narrative of the Passion of Christ. The Pensive Christ is much more common in sculpture than in painting, where the similar Man of Sorrows is more often depicted (in which Jesus is shown with the wounds of the crucifixion).

== Development of the image ==
The first known depictions of the Pensive Christ occur in northern German sculptures from the latter half of the 14th century, taking a pose already found in paintings of the preparations for the crucifixion, where Jesus sits in thought as the soldiers work to raise the cross. Before this, the pose had been used for the figure of Job in Distress, according to typology one of the prefigurements of Christ. Art historians link its appearance with the Devotio Moderna (Latin for "modern devotion"), which stressed the human nature of Jesus, a model for the faithful to follow.

Most of the statues of the Pensive Christ were made around 1500 and in the first quarter of the 16th century, on the eve of the Reformation. Most of them are preserved in the area of northwest Bohemia and Saxony, which were strongly affected by the Reformation. Christ is depicted at a specific moment of his earthly suffering, when he rests while dragging the cross on the way to Golgotha. He is thus presented to the believer in his human nature and invites him to contemplation.

The image became especially popular in Silesia and Pomerania, and then Poland and Lithuania, where it became strongly entrenched in folk art wood carvings by Dievdirbiai (Lithuanian folk carvers; example below).

A related image, the Herrgottsruh ("Repose of the Lord" in German), does not have the chin resting on a hand; Christ sits, often with hands crossed in his lap. This appeared in Italian painting at the end of the 14th century and soon spread to sculpture in southern Germany and Austria.

== Gallery ==
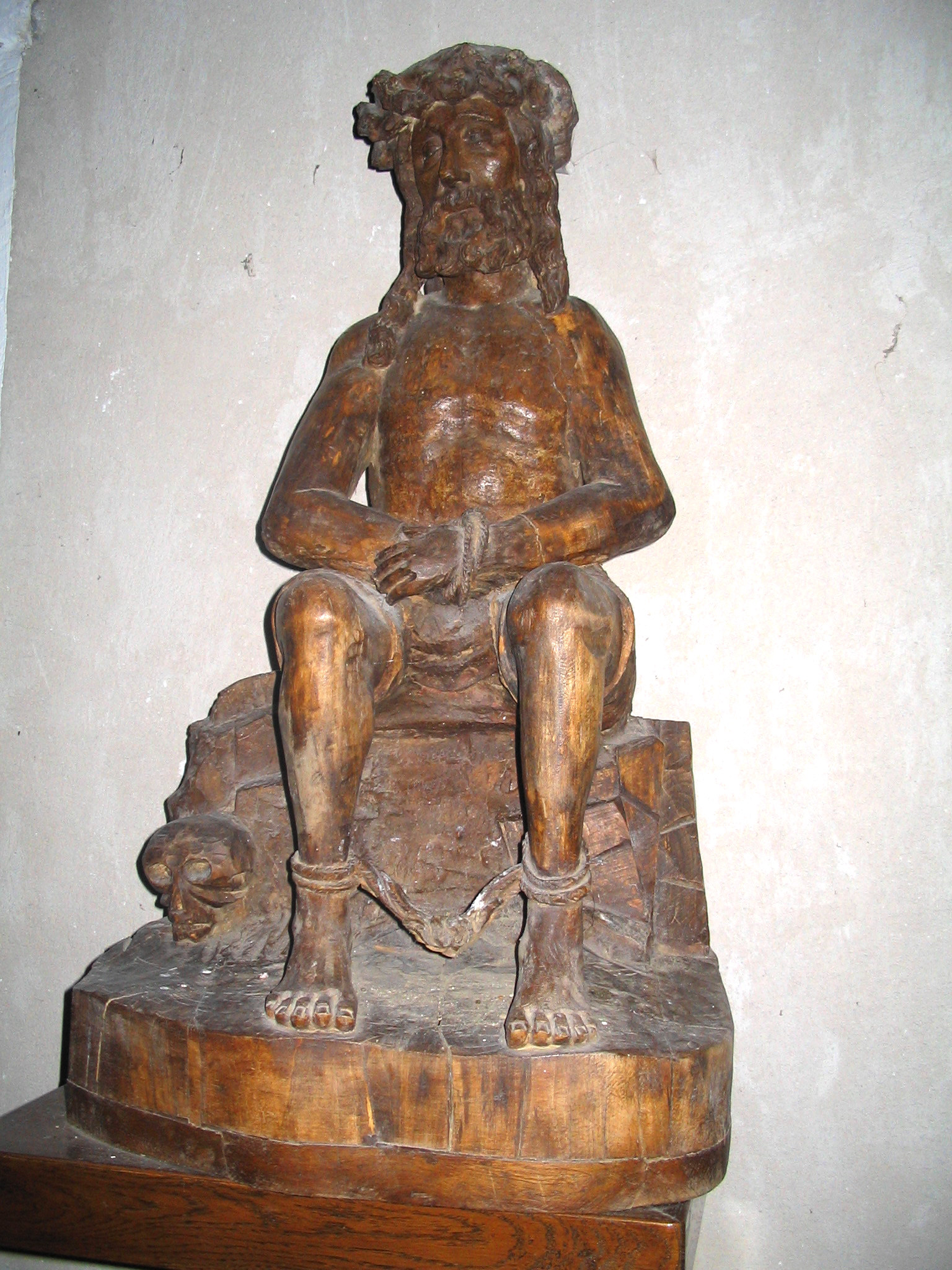
16th-century sculpture from the Jura (France)

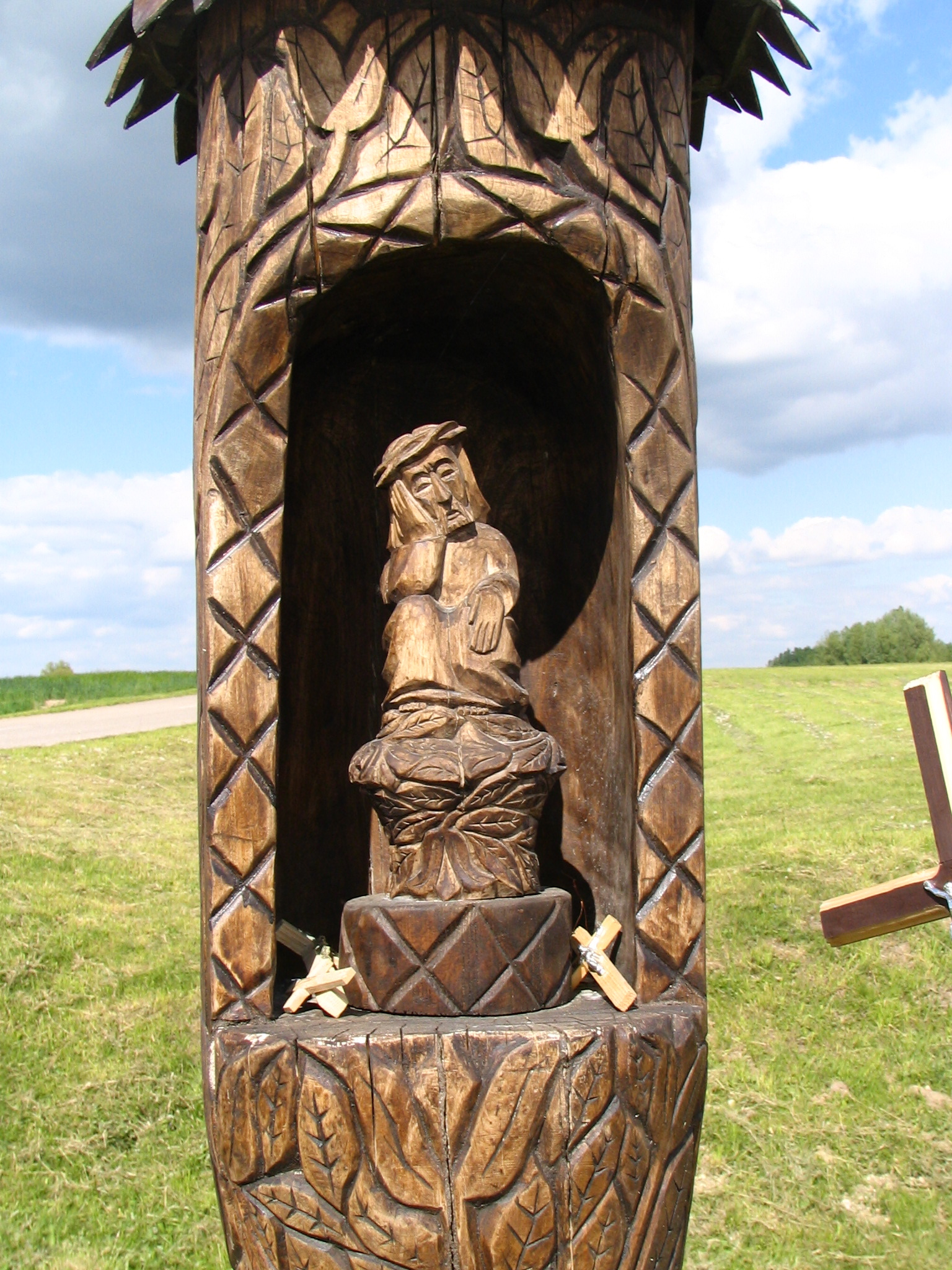
Roadside shrine with a Pensive Christ in Lithuania

=== In Germany ===
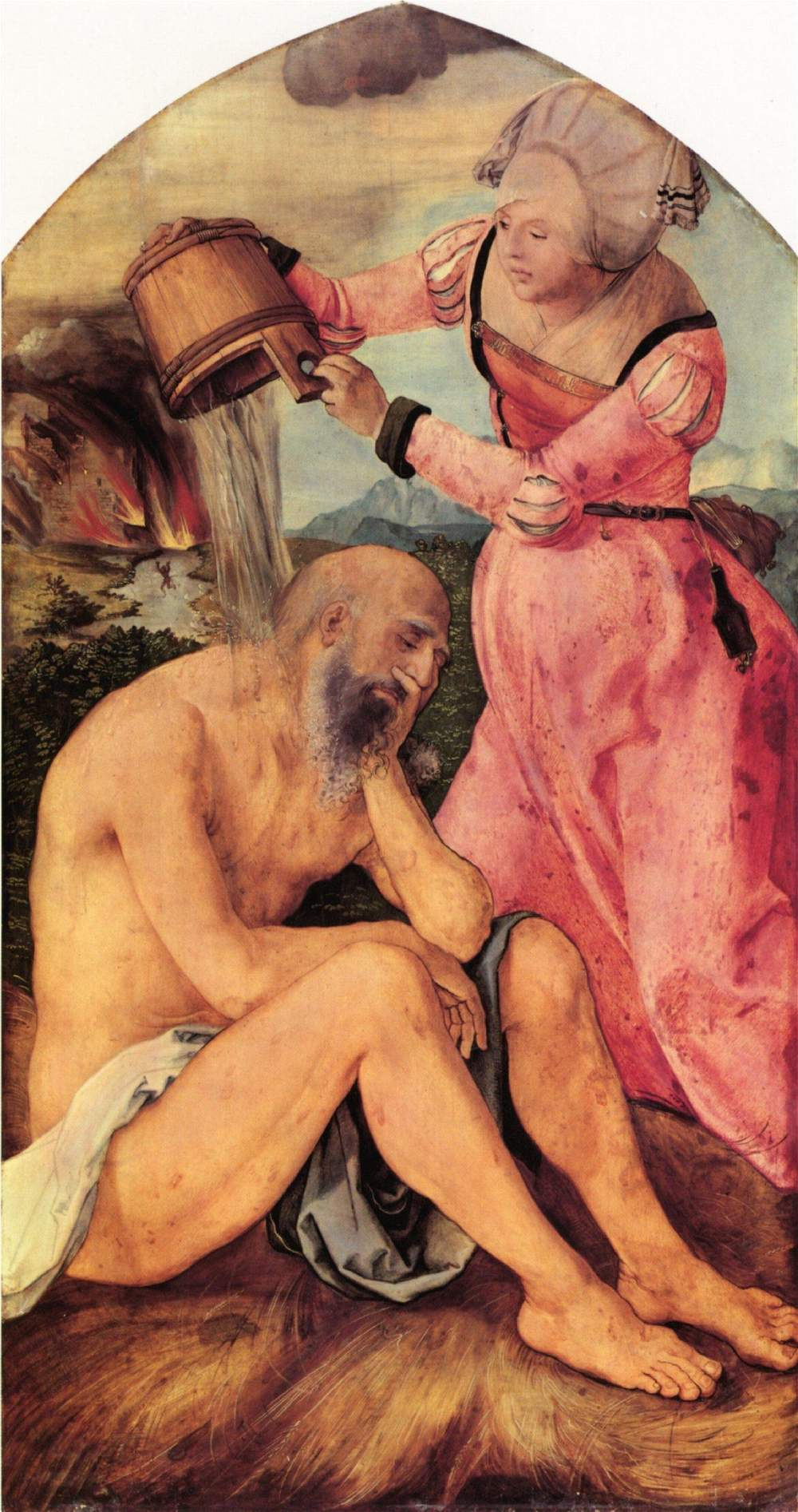
Job, in his traditional pose, by Albrecht Dürer

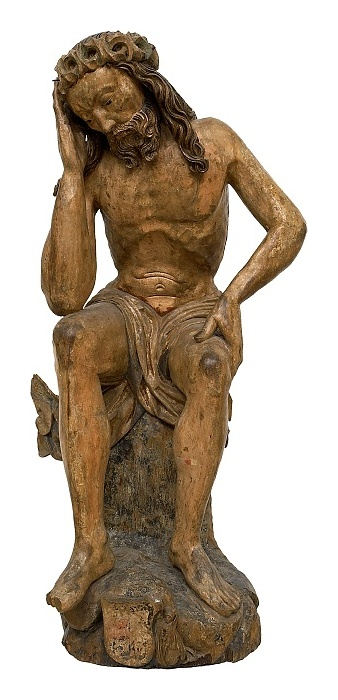
Pensive Christ of Seeberg (around 1509)

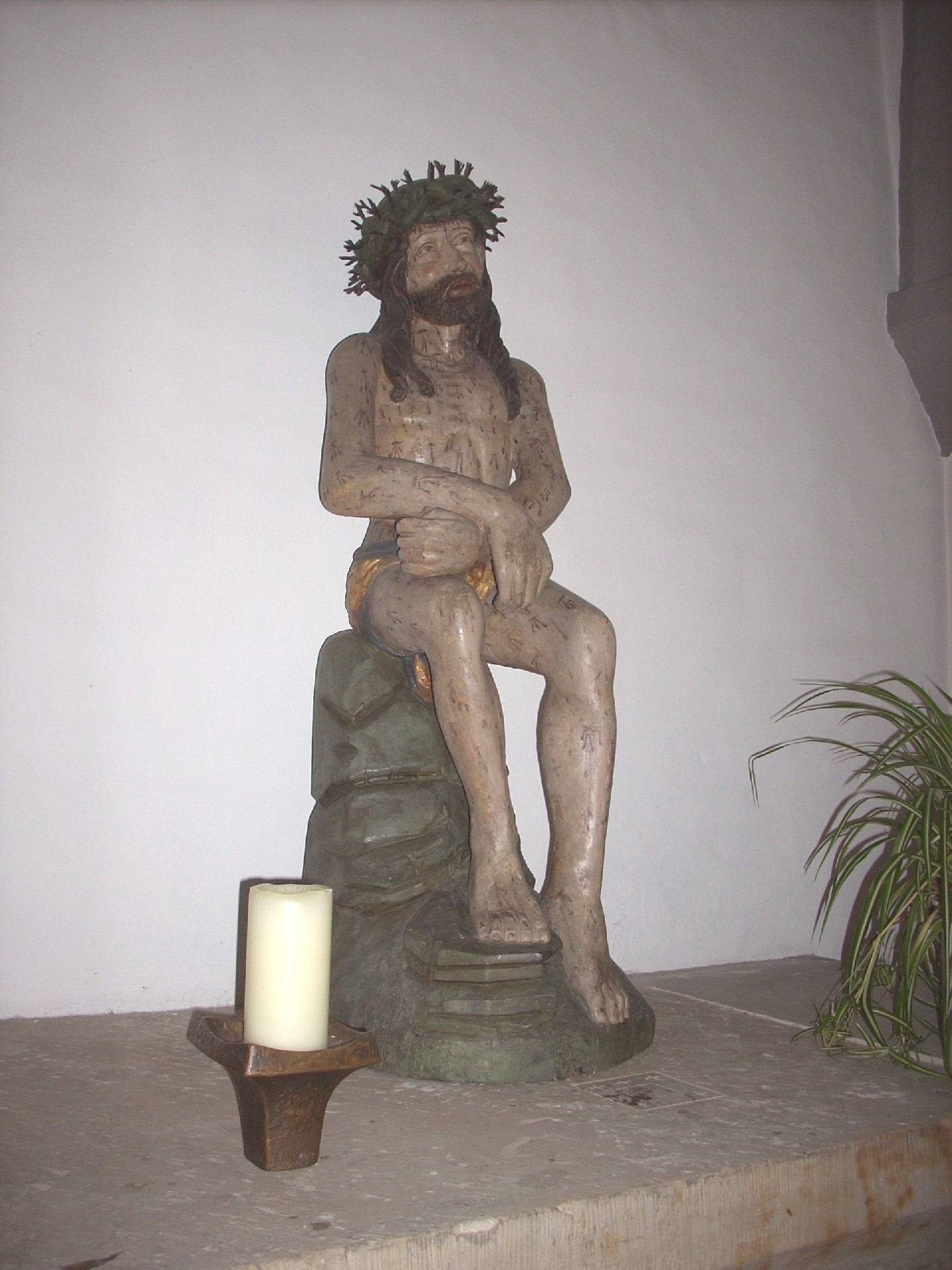
German Herrgottsruh

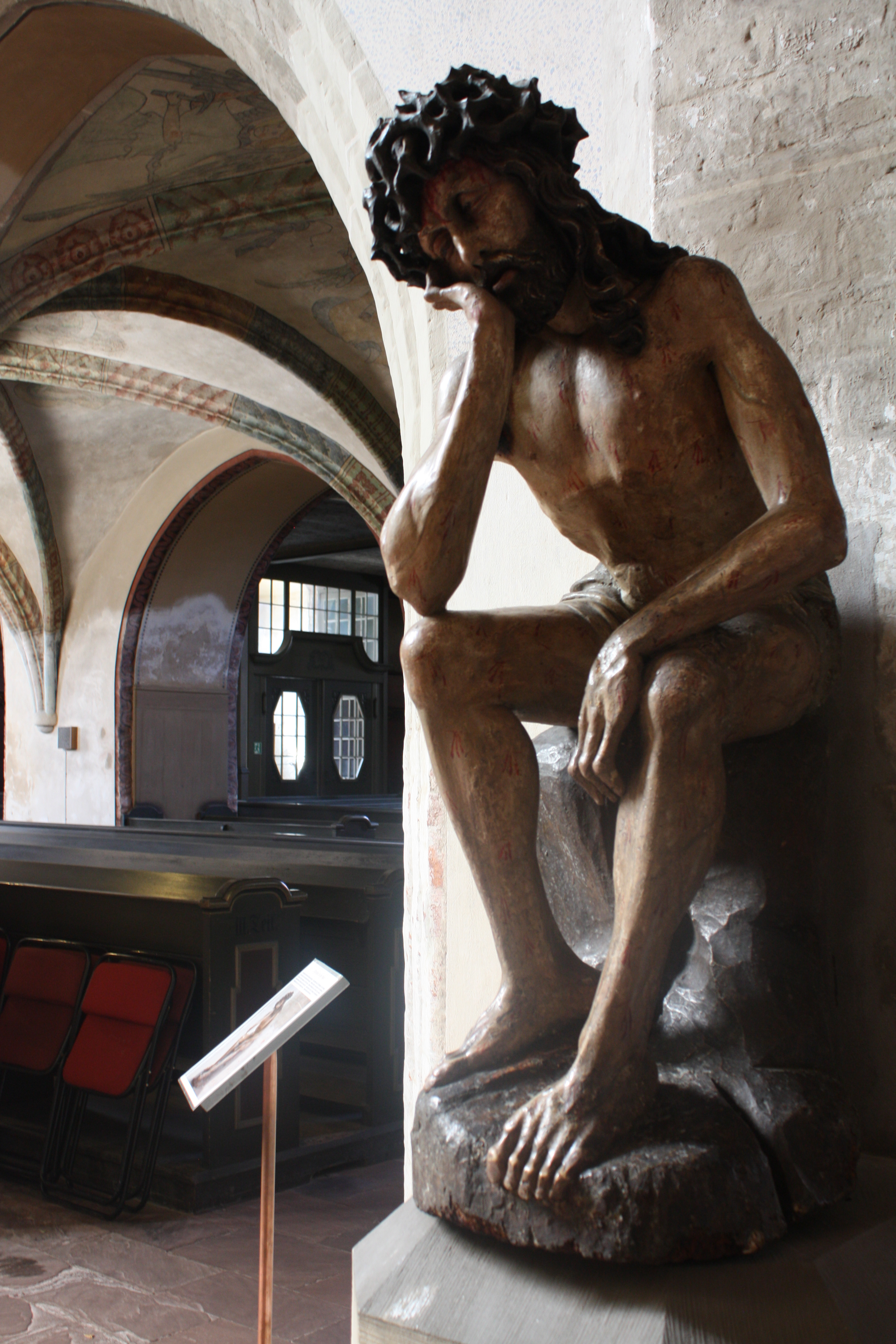
Statue of a Pensive Christ, Dreifaltigkeitskirche, Görlitz, Germany

=== In Poland ===
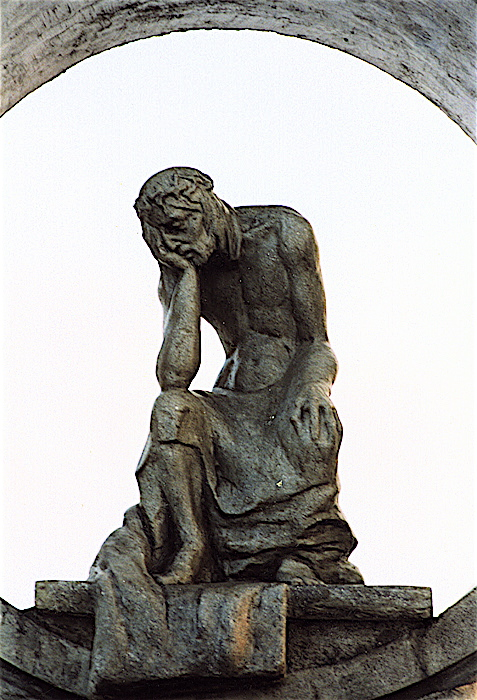
Roadside shrine with a Pensive Christ in Kurowice, Poland

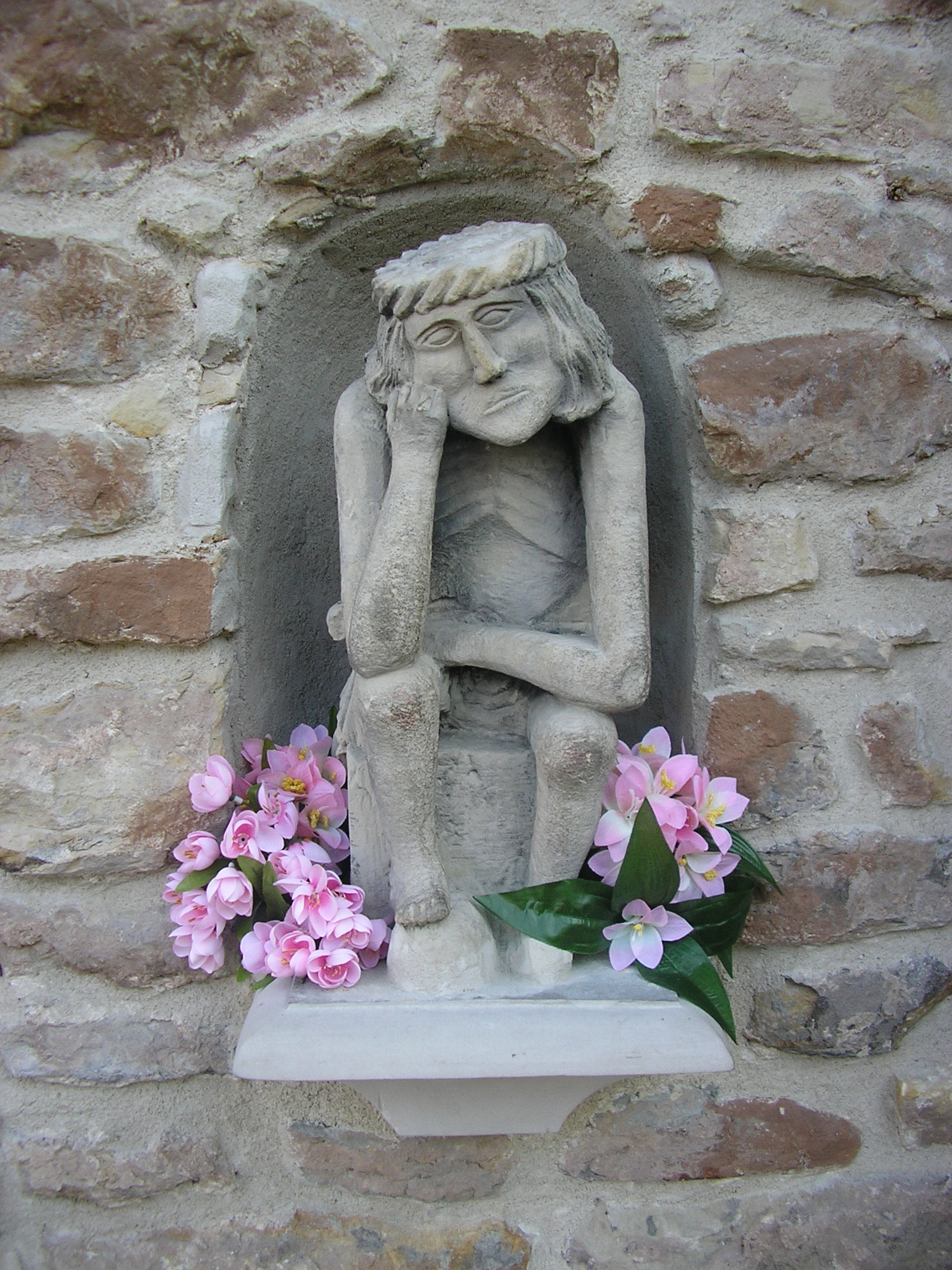
"Pensive Christ" (Chrystus Frasobliwy) at St Sigismund's Church, Szydlowiec, Poland

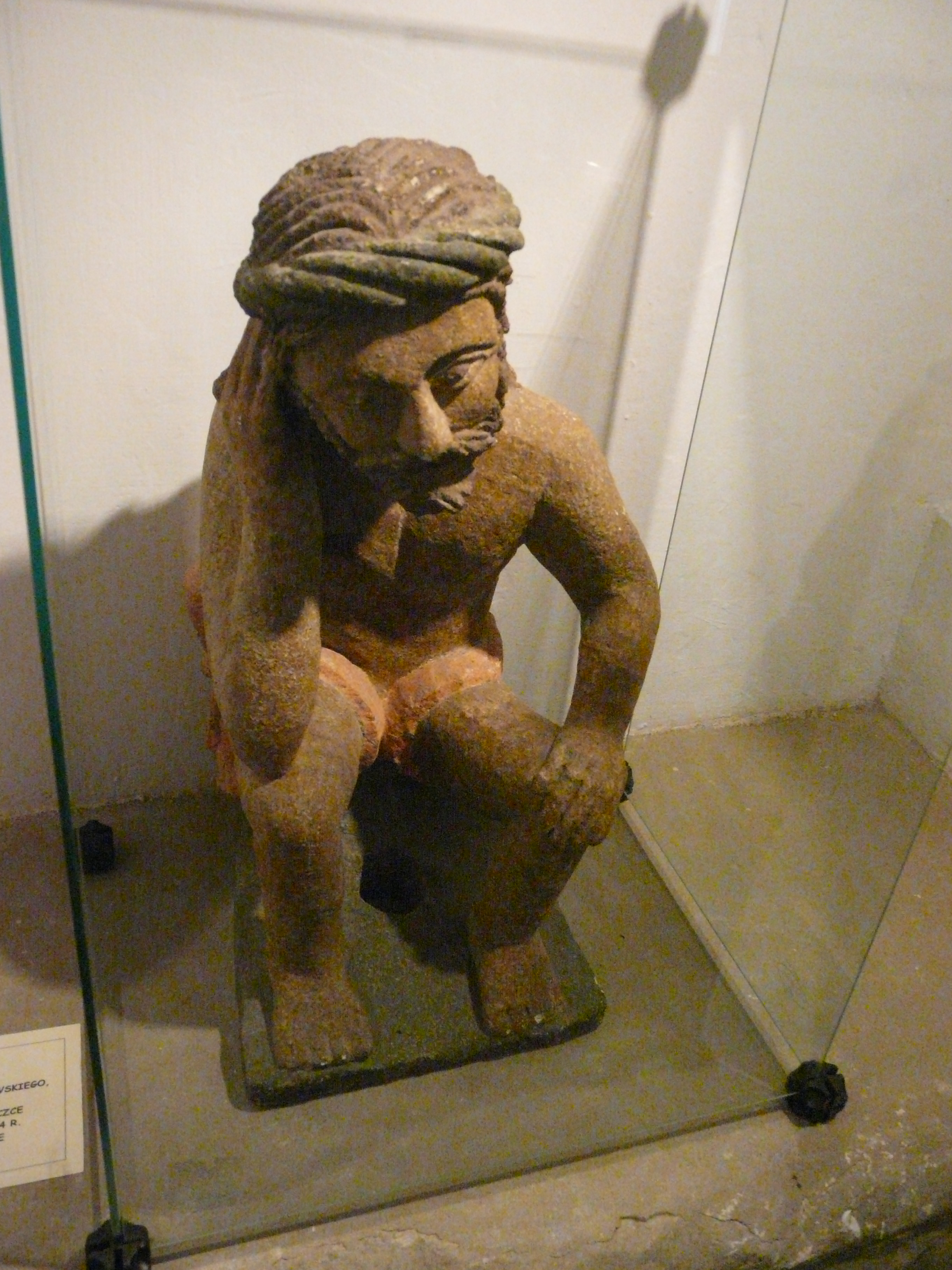
Chrystus Frasobliwy, 16th c, Muzeum Regionalne PTTK, Gorlice (Poland)

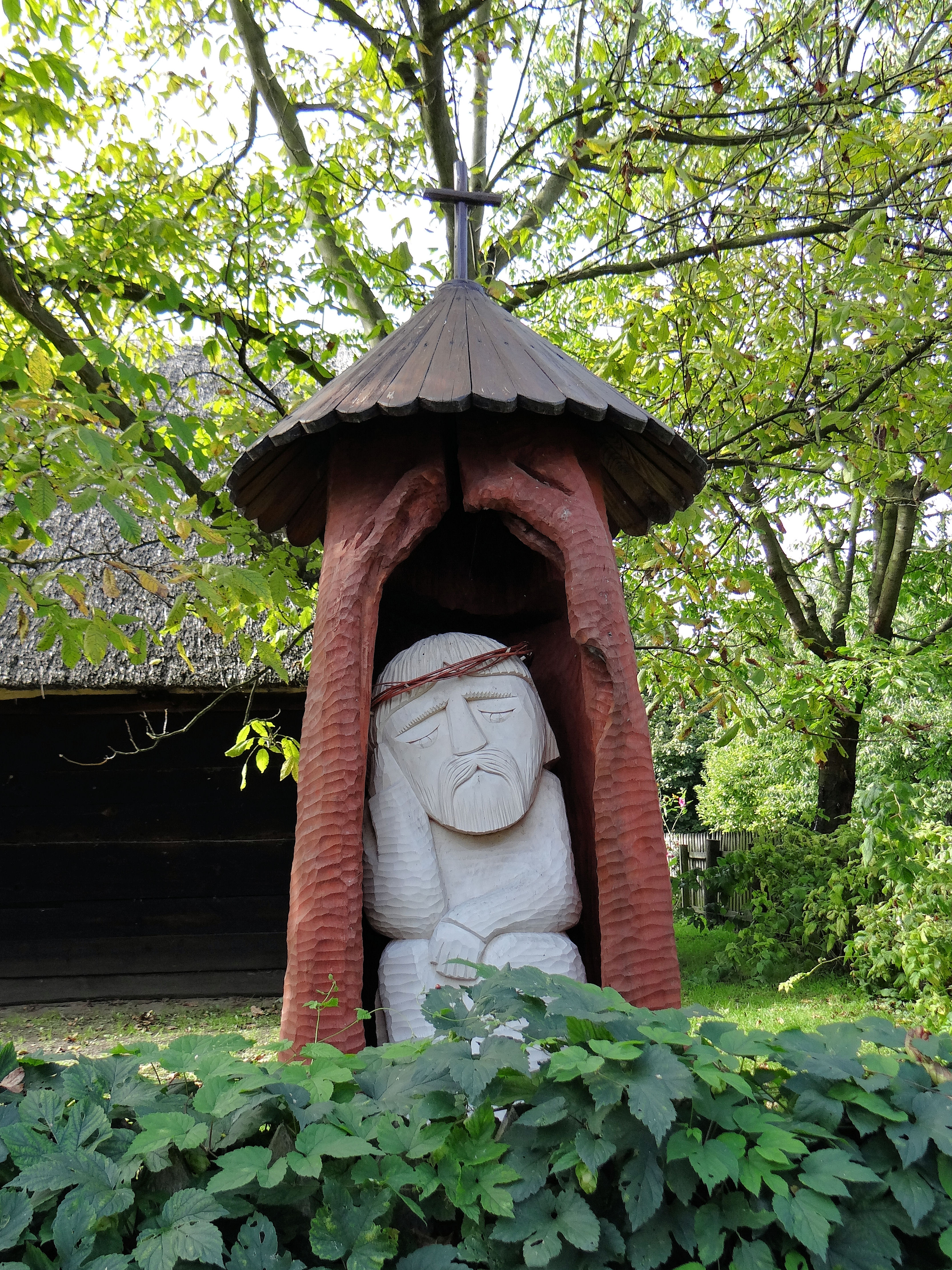
Chrystus Frasobliwy, ethnographic skansen, Gosławice (Poland)

=== In Russia ===
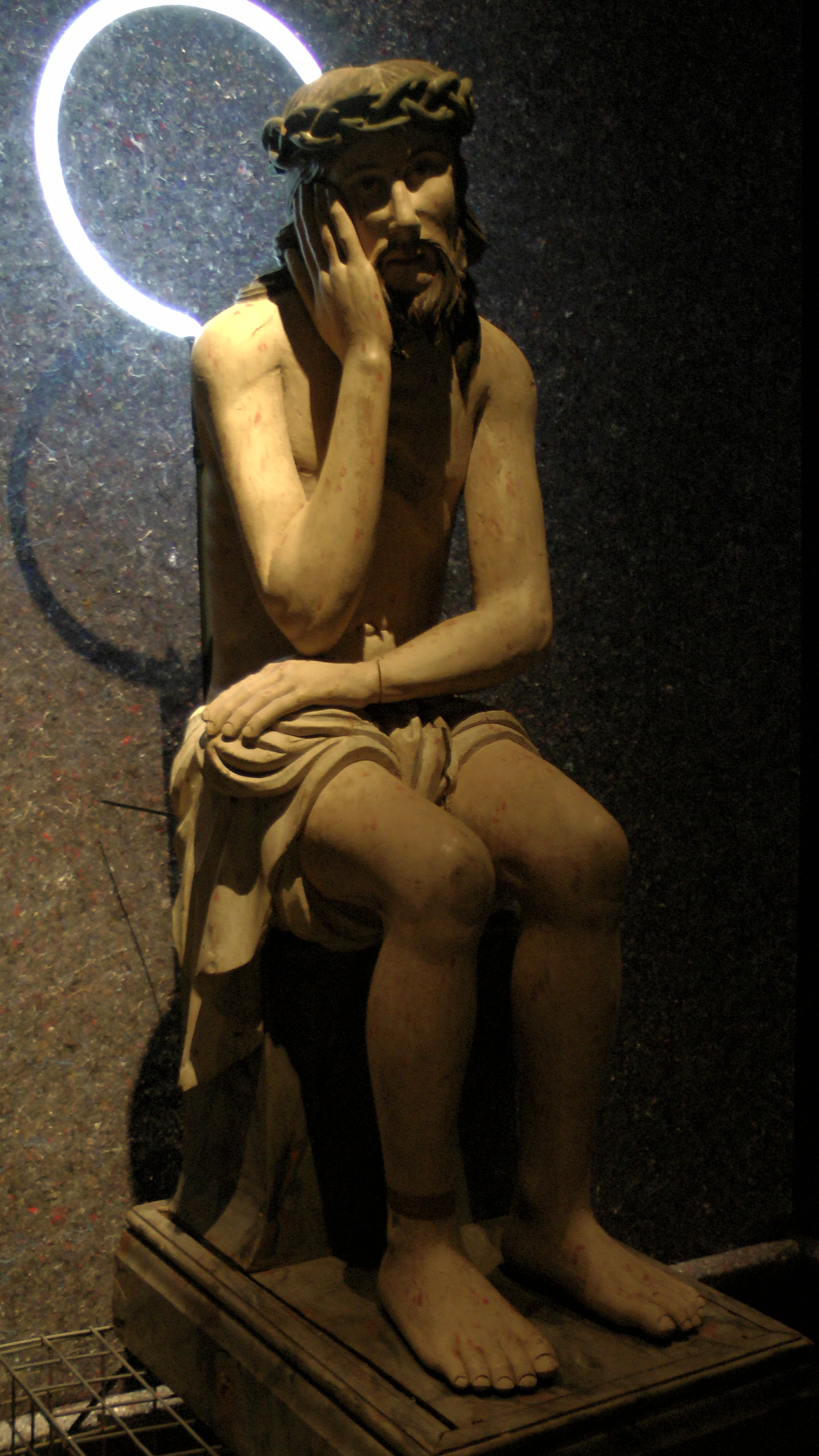
Wooden sculpture, 17th century, Totma

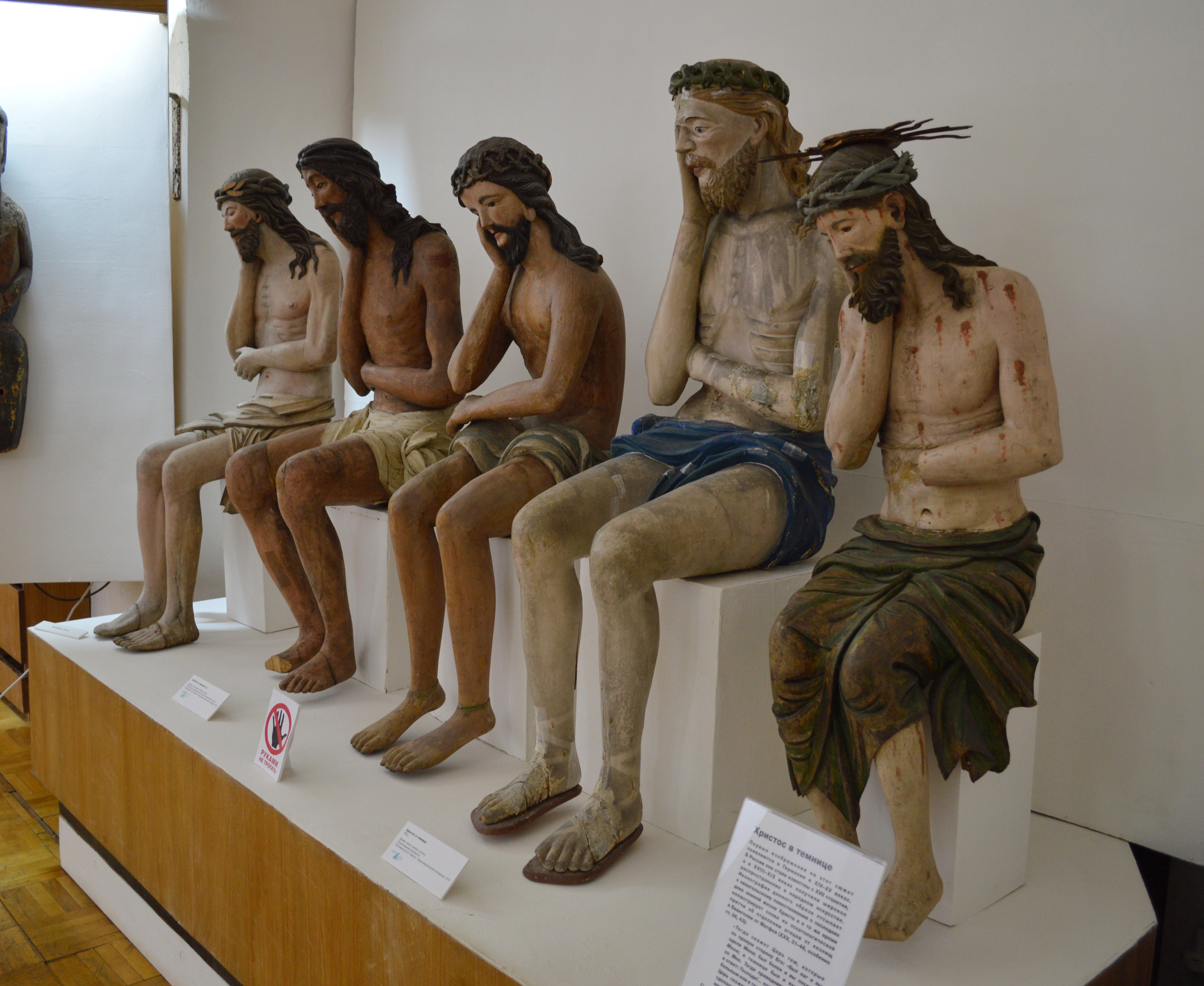
Wooden sculptures, 19th century, Pereslavl-Zalessky

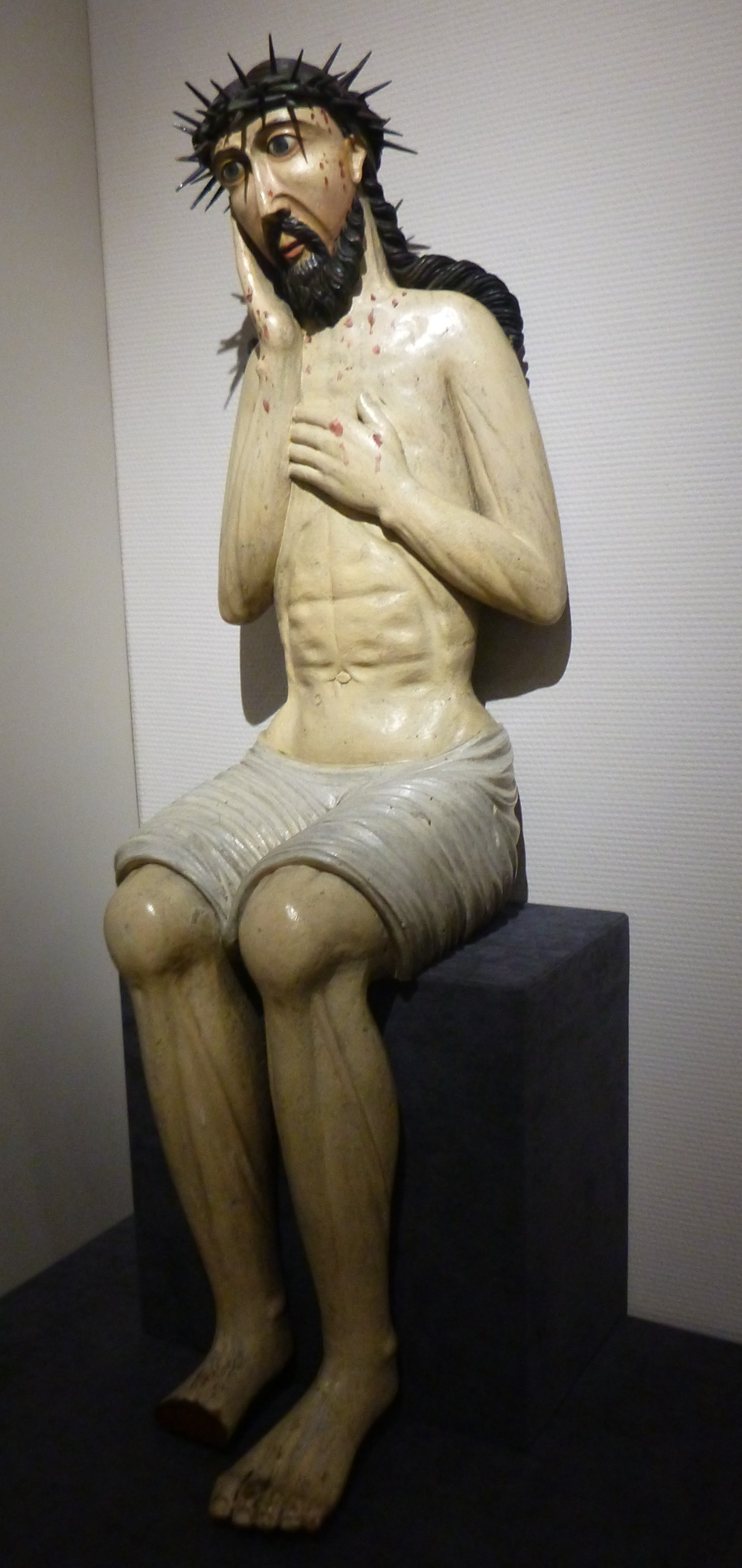
Wooden sculpture, 18th century, Perm

== See also ==
- Ecce homo
