= Lauterbach, Austria =

Lauterbach
- Village of Brixen im Thale
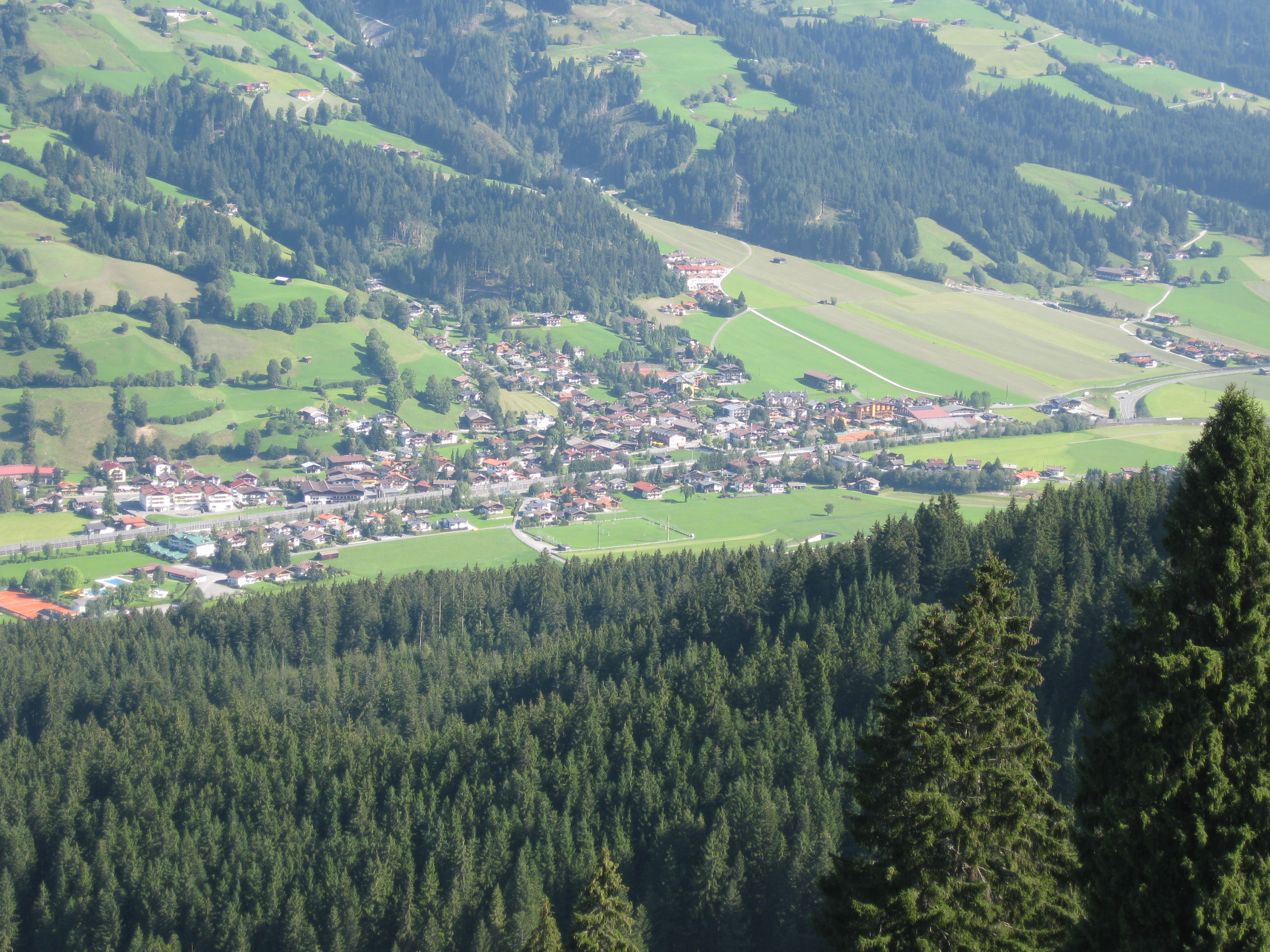
- View of Lauterbach

- Location within Austria
- Coordinates: 47°27′7″N 12°15′46″E
- Country: Austria
- State: Tyrol
- District: Kitzbühel
- Elevation: 810 m (2,660 ft)

Population (2001-05-15)
  - Total: 714
- Time zone: UTC+1 (CET)
  - Summer (DST): UTC+2 (CEST)
- Postal code: 6364
- Vehicle registration: KB

Lauterbach (German pronunciation: [ˈlaʊtɐbax]) is a village in the municipality of Brixen im Thale in Austria with 714 inhabitants (as of 15 May 2001). It is the largest and most populous village in the municipality.

== History and geography ==
The settlement of Lauterbach is located at about 800 metres (2,600 ft) above sea level, east of the centre of Brixen. Its name comes from the mountain stream of Lauterbach that has significantly affected the development of the settlement for centuries. In 1812, the village had around 30 houses with 167 inhabitants. After the Second World War, there was twice that number of houses; in recent years, there have been over 200 houses, with around 900 inhabitants.

The reason for the rapid growth in population in recent decades is due, on the one hand, to land prices, and on the other to the farmers who lived there. Because, in the main, only small farmers lived in Lauterbach, only full-time farmers lived in the village centre of Brixen around the church. As a result, these farmers and the church, too, were less prepared to sell land to settlers than the many smallholding farmers in Lauterbach. As a result, a proper village centre never developed.

1946: severe weather came down from the Hohe Salve. Hailstones the size of a fist rained down. The Brixenbach broke its banks and largely flooded the village of Feuring-Winkl. The Lauterbach became a raging torrent. Large rocks filled the stream bed to such an extent that water poured into the centre of the village and tore away anything that stood in its way. All the houses were devastated by mud and debris, and all the cellars were flooded. Telephone lines were disrupted. Rubble and piles of wood blocked the railway. Near the village centre, the Lauterbach finally flowed into the Brixentaler Ache. All lead and tile roofs were badly damaged; there was even a hole in the roof of the rectory.

1951: heavy rain led to flooding. The Lauterbach covered the federal road and the railway track. Rail and road traffic were held up for hours.

1957: the houses in Brixen and Lauterbach were connected to a new water mains that came from the Gaisberg.

1971: serious flooding occurred again in Brixen. The Lauterbach broke its banks again. Work parties laboured into the early hours of the morning in order to prevent further flooding.

1975: flood warnings in the village of Lauterbach. The newly built road bridge over the Lauterbach was entirely ripped away. The floods cause major damage.
