= Schiltach (river) =

River of Baden-Württemberg, Germany

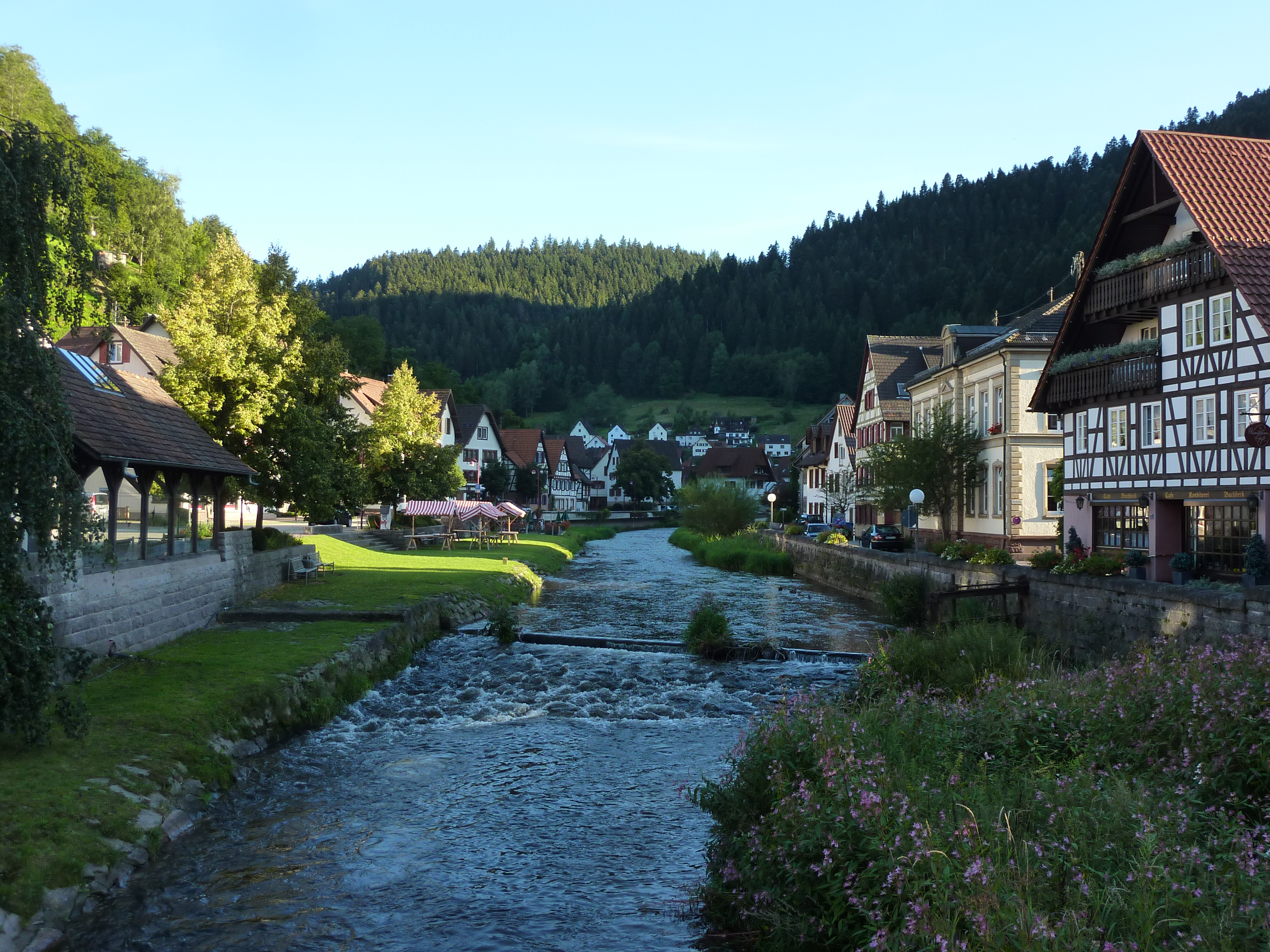
- The Schiltach in Schiltach, just before it flows into the Kinzig

Location
- Country: Germany
- State: Baden-Württemberg

Physical characteristics
- Mouth
  - location: Kinzig
  - coordinates: 48°17′26″N 8°20′32″E
- Length: 29.5 km (18.3 mi)

Basin features
- Progression: Kinzig→ Rhine→ North Sea

The Schiltach (German pronunciation: [ˈʃɪltax]; in its upper course also: Berneck) is a river of Baden-Württemberg, Germany. It is a tributary of the Kinzig in the town Schiltach.

== See also ==
- List of rivers of Baden-Württemberg
