= Neuendorf, Bavaria =

Neuendorf
- Municipality
- Coat of arms

- Location of Neuendorf within Main-Spessart district
- Interactive map of Neuendorf
- Location within Germany Location within Bavaria
- Coordinates: 50°1′57″N 9°38′38″E
- Country: Germany
- State: Bavaria
- Admin. region: Unterfranken
- District: Main-Spessart
- Municipal assoc.: Lohr am Main

Government
  - Mayor (2020–26): Karlheinz Albert

Area
  - Total: 9.64 km^{2} (3.72 sq mi)
- Elevation: 156 m (512 ft)

Population (2025-12-31)
  - Total: 803
  - Density: 83.3/km^{2} (216/sq mi)
- Time zone: UTC+01:00 (CET)
  - Summer (DST): UTC+02:00 (CEST)
- Postal codes: 97788
- Dialling codes: 09351
- Vehicle registration: MSP
- Website: www.neuendorf-main.de

Neuendorf (German pronunciation: [ˈnɔʏəndɔʁf]) is a municipality in the Main-Spessart district in the Regierungsbezirk of Lower Franconia (Unterfranken) in Bavaria, Germany and a member of the Verwaltungsgemeinschaft (Administrative Community) of Lohr am Main.

== Geography ==
=== Location ===
Neuendorf lies in the Würzburg Region in the Vorspessart, and is bounded on the south by the river Main. It lies between the towns of Gemünden am Main and Lohr.

=== Constituent communities and Gemarkungen ===
The community has only the Gemarkung (traditional rural cadastral area) of Neuendorf; however, it is made up of two Ortsteile called Neuendorf and Nantenbach.

== History ==
The community had its first documentary mention on 27 May 1325. The village's founding, however, may go back further. Nantenbach is the older part of the community. It is believed that the name Neuendorf came from the idea of building a new village (neues Dorf in German, with the —es ending changing to —en in the genitive and dative cases). Neuendorf's and Nantenbach's townsmen in the early days had to pay tribute to oft-changing feudal lords, among others the Prince-Bishops in Mainz, the Amt of Hanau, the Stewardship of Lohr and the Counts of Rieneck. Compulsory labour sometimes had to be performed for the Amt of Partenstein and Hohenroth. In Nantenbach, at the address now called Mainstraße 9, the building there once housed the old tithe house and tithe barn. The inhabitants fed themselves for generations with the products of their own farming, which was done on meagre bunter.

As part of the Archbishopric of Mainz, Neuendorf passed in the 1803 Reichsdeputationshauptschluss to the newly formed Principality of Aschaffenburg, with which it passed in 1814 (by this time it had become a department of the Grand Duchy of Frankfurt) to Bavaria. In the course of administrative reform in Bavaria, the current community came into being with the Gemeindeedikt (“Municipal Edict”) of 1818.

In the course of municipal reform in Bavaria, Neuendorf managed to keep its self-administration, and was grouped into the Verwaltungsgemeinschaft (Administrative Community) of Lohr am Main. Nonetheless, Neuendorf is the district's least populous community with fewer than one thousand people.

=== Religion ===
Ecclesiastically, Neuendorf and Nantenbach formerly belonged to the Catholic parish of Lohr am Main, and then later to Langenprozelten. In 1717, a small branch church was built in Neuendorf, which in 1928 and 1929 was expanded to its current size. The church's patron is Saint Sebastian. For 70 years, the parish has had its own priest. Today the village's population is about 90% Catholic.

=== Population development ===
Within town limits, 754 inhabitants were counted in 1970, 868 in 1987 and in 2000 924.

== Politics ==
=== Mayors ===
Until mid-2008, Konrad Rauch (CSU/Unabhängige Bürger) was the Mayor of Neuendorf.

Since 2008, there have been the following chief mayor (1) and two deputies (2, 3):

1. Karlheinz Albert (Freie Wähler Dorfgemeinschaft Neuendorf)
2. Werkmeister Bernd (Freie Wähler Dorfgemeinschaft Neuendorf)
3. Ebert Oliver (CSU/Unabhängige Bürger)

Municipal taxes in 1999 amounted to €595,000 (converted), of which net business taxes amounted to €217,000.

=== Town partnerships ===
- Neuendorf, Solothurn, Switzerland since the 1980s

=== Coat of arms ===
The community's arms might be described thus: Per fess embattled, in chief gules two arrows argent in saltire, in base Or a planing knife azure with blade and handles to base.

The community has borne its own arms since 1981.

The armorial commentary reads thus:

“Neuendorf’s history was mainly characterized by the Counts of Rieneck, who are remembered in the municipal arms by the colours red and gold. The church of Neuendorf built in 1717 is consecrated to Saint Sebastian. This patronage is represented by the crossed arrows as this saint’s symbol. The more than three-hundred-year-old barrel hoop making and woodworking tradition in Neuendorf and Nantenbach is recalled by the planing knife. On the opposite side of the Main from Neuendorf is found the ruin of the former Schönrain Priory, which after its abolition in the 16th century was used by the Counts of Rieneck as a castle and an administration building. In the arms, the battlements refer to this priory or castle complex.”

The Schönrain ruin does not lie within Neuendorf municipal limits, but is nonetheless the community's landmark. In the community, a street named Schönrainstraße refers to the complex, and the festival hall bears the name “Schönrainhalle”.

== Economy and infrastructure ==
Until seventy years ago, Neuendorf was a strictly agricultural village. The small farmers here bettered their livelihood by working in the forest, carving barrel staves, peeling bark and transporting wood to landing places on the Main. In the 1920s, home tailoring gained a foothold in Neuendorf and brought with it an economic upswing. Between 1950 and 1960, agriculture shrank in importance as there were better earning opportunities by then, especially in nearby Lohr am Main. Today the community has but one full-time farmer. According to official statistics, in 1999, there were 4 agricultural operations with a working area of 89 ha, of which 53 ha was cropland and 34 ha was meadowland. Thus it came to pass that a former farming village changed into a residential one.

Among industries that have settled in the community, a metalworking (flexible wire parts) business, a special firm for machinery add-ons, a concrete works – mostly for prefabricated floors – and a car body shop can be named. According to official statistics, there were 157 workers on the social welfare contribution rolls working in producing businesses in 1998. In trade and transport this was 0. In other areas, 348 such workers worked from home.

Neuendorf is a community rich in woodland. Within the 965 ha municipal area, 171 ha of the roughly 700 ha of woodland is in the community's ownership. For this reason, the community has developed an 8.5 km network of forest lanes that is accessible to trucks.

=== Infrastructure ===
The water supply system, which dated from 1901, was thoroughly overhauled in the years 1972 to 1978. The municipal sewage system has likewise been overhauled in sections since 1960. The sewage plant was able to come into service in 1994 after the main collection canal and the settling facility had been finished. The graveyard was enlarged in the years 1953 and 1970 and a few years ago, the older section was renovated. In 1995, a new building development area called “Am Thürlein” with 42 lots was opened up.

=== Transport ===
The newly built Nantenbach Curve and Nantenbach Main Valley Bridge (Maintalbrücke Nantenbach) on the Aschaffenburg-Würzburg railway line and the bypass on Bundesstraße 26 have changed the community's face considerably. From 1901 to 1982, Neuendorf had its own railway station. Today the community is served by public transport association buses running on the B 26. The community is included in the Bavarian village renewal programme. As part of the village beautification measures, Frankenstraße (street) was at last newly renovated in 2001 and 2002. In past years it was possible with the Würzburg Road Building Office's help to build a continuous cycle path along the Main to both Gemünden am Main and Lohr am Main. A modern town hall with a multipurpose hall for local clubs, a new kindergarten, and a sporting ground newly built by SV Neuendorf (the sport club) along with its clubhouse should foster the sense of community and a variety of activities in the community.

== Education and culture ==
Schoolchildren from years one to eight were until 1967 taught in the community-owned schoolhouse in Neuendorf. In the course of school realignment, years five to eight have been schooled in Langenprozelten since 1967, with the years one to four staying in Neuendorf until 1974. Today, all Neuendorf children go to primary school or secondary schools in Lohr am Main.

Participating in local cultural life are the orchestra, the Franconian Costume Orchestra, the “Schönrain Echo”, the sport club, the FC Bayern Fanclub, a Shrovetide Carnival (known in Franconia as Fasenacht) club, the fire brigade, a Red Cross society, a mixed choir, the Catholic Women's League, the fruitgrowing and gardening club, the ComputerClub Neuendorf and the Kolping Family. Available for bigger events is a multipurpose hall, the Schönrainhalle, which in 2002 and 2003 was thoroughly renovated.

== Sources ==
- Verwaltungsgemeinschaft (Administrative Community) of Lohr am Main
