= Lohr am Main (Verwaltungsgemeinschaft) =

- Verwaltungsgemeinschaft
- Location of Lohr am Main within Main-Spessart district
- Interactive map of Lohr am Main
- Location within Germany Location within Bavaria
- Coordinates: 50°00′N 9°35′E
- Country: Germany
- State: Bavaria
- Admin. region: Lower Franconia
- District: Main-Spessart
- Seat: Lohr am Main
- Subdivisions: 4 municipalities

Area
  - Total: 70.42 km^{2} (27.19 sq mi)

Population (2025-12-31)
  - Total: 5,072
  - Density: 72.02/km^{2} (186.5/sq mi)
- Time zone: UTC+01:00 (CET)
  - Summer (DST): UTC+02:00 (CEST)
- Website: www.vgem-lohr.de

Lohr am Main is a Verwaltungsgemeinschaft (municipal association) in the district Main-Spessart in Bavaria, Germany. Its seat is in Lohr am Main, itself not part of the Verwaltungsgemeinschaft.

It consists of the following municipalities:

1. Neuendorf
2. Neustadt am Main
3. Rechtenbach
4. Steinfeld
