= Neustadt am Main Abbey =

German Benedictine monastery, 738–1803

- Kloster Neustadt am Main
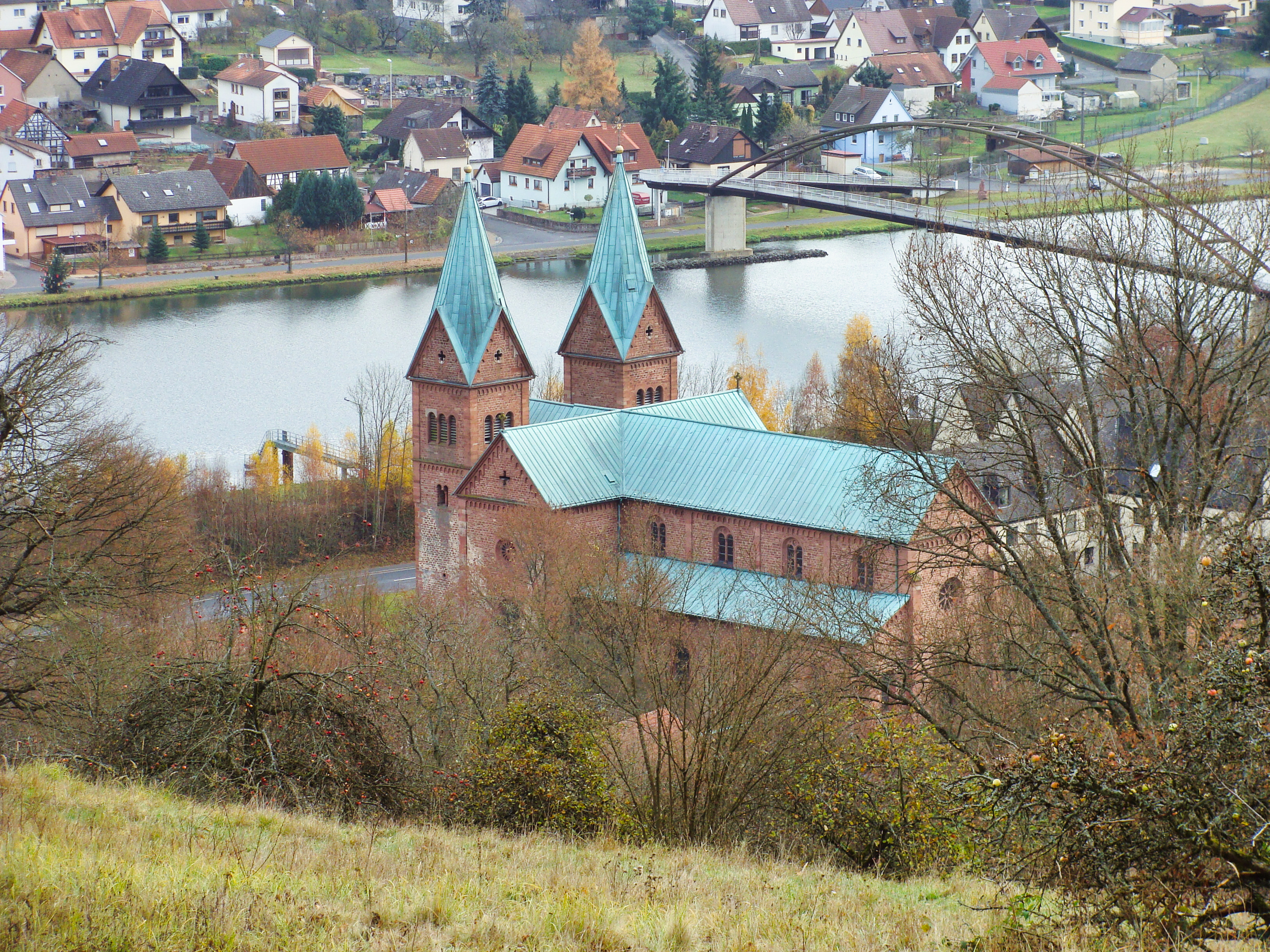
- St. Michael und Gertrud, the former abbey church

- Location within Germany
- Interactive map of Neustadt am Main Abbey

Monastery information
- Order: Benedictines
- Established: 738
- Disestablished: 1803

Site
- Location: Neustadt am Main, Germany
- Coordinates: 49°55′48″N 9°34′13″E
- Public access: partial

Neustadt am Main Abbey (German: Kloster Neustadt am Main) was an abbey of the Benedictine Order in Neustadt am Main, Bavaria, Germany. It existed from the 8th century until the dissolution of abbeys in the course of secularization in 1803. During its heyday in the early Middle Ages, the abbey was a political power that vied for regional influence with the Prince-bishops of Würzburg, the Archbishops of Mainz and the Counts of Rieneck. Today its location is occupied by a (mostly newly constructed) monastery operated by the nuns of the "Dominican Order of Saint Catherine of Siena", also known as Kloster Neustadt. The former abbey church today serves as the Catholic parish church for Neustadt.

== History ==
=== Foundation and Royal abbey ===
A Benedictine abbey here was first mentioned (Niwenstat) in a document from 768/769, when Megingoz, second Bishop of Würzburg, retired from his post to found a monastery at what is today known as Michaelsberg, referred to in historic sources as Rorinlacha. This location apparently marked a Frankish hunting lodge, gifted by a local count, Hatto. Reportedly, the consecration of the abbey church in 793 was attended by Charlemagne, Willibald, Bishop of Eichstätt and Lullus, Archbishop of Mainz (although the latter in fact died in 786). Berowelf, who succeeded Megingoz as Bishop of Würzburg, sent 50 monks to join him at this Nivenstat or Nuovenstatt ("new place").

To establish the new foundation's independence from Würzburg, Megingoz succeeded in making it a Königskloster, chartered by the Franconian king and not subject to control by a bishop. The Royal charter issued in 794 has been lost, a document long held to be the foundation charter was later discovered to be a forgery from c. 1200. However, Charlemagne is known to have supported the abbey financially and gifted it with large properties in the nearby Spessart hills.

With substantial land holdings in the region, the abbey rose to become one of the most important in Franconia and monks from Neustadt played a key role in bringing Christianity to the Saxons from Verden an der Aller, working closely with the abbey at Amorbach, which was often led by the same abbot as Neustadt.

=== Loss of independence ===
In the Franconian church, the Neustadt abbot ranked second only to the bishop. However, in the late 10th century, the abbey came under the influence of the Prince-bishop of Würzburg. In 993, Emperor Otto III issued a charter at his Pfalz at Tilleda which "restored" the abbey along with others in the region to the Bishop of Würzburg, then Bernward von Rothenburg. He had made use of forged documents purporting to show that these abbeys did in fact belong to his diocese (Eigenklöster). Despite this overlordship, Neustadt largely managed to maintain its significant land holdings over the following centuries and strove to regain its independence into the 13th century. In the course of these struggles, the 12th-century forgery was created, seemingly to compensate for the loss of the original charter. There was also some confusion about the identity of the Gertrud, supposed to be a founder of the abbey. The later documents (and some works of art) made her out to be Gertrude of Nivelles, daughter of Pippin the Elder, but this Saint died in 659. Some references are made to her having been a sister of Charlemagne, but his sisters had other names.

The abbey also added Martin of Tours, the Saint most closely associated with the Frankish kingdom, as a second patron (next to Mary), thus emphasizing its closeness to the king and emperor. In the 11th century the abbey was part of the reform movement emanating from Gorze Abbey and in the 12th century joined the Hirsau Reforms.

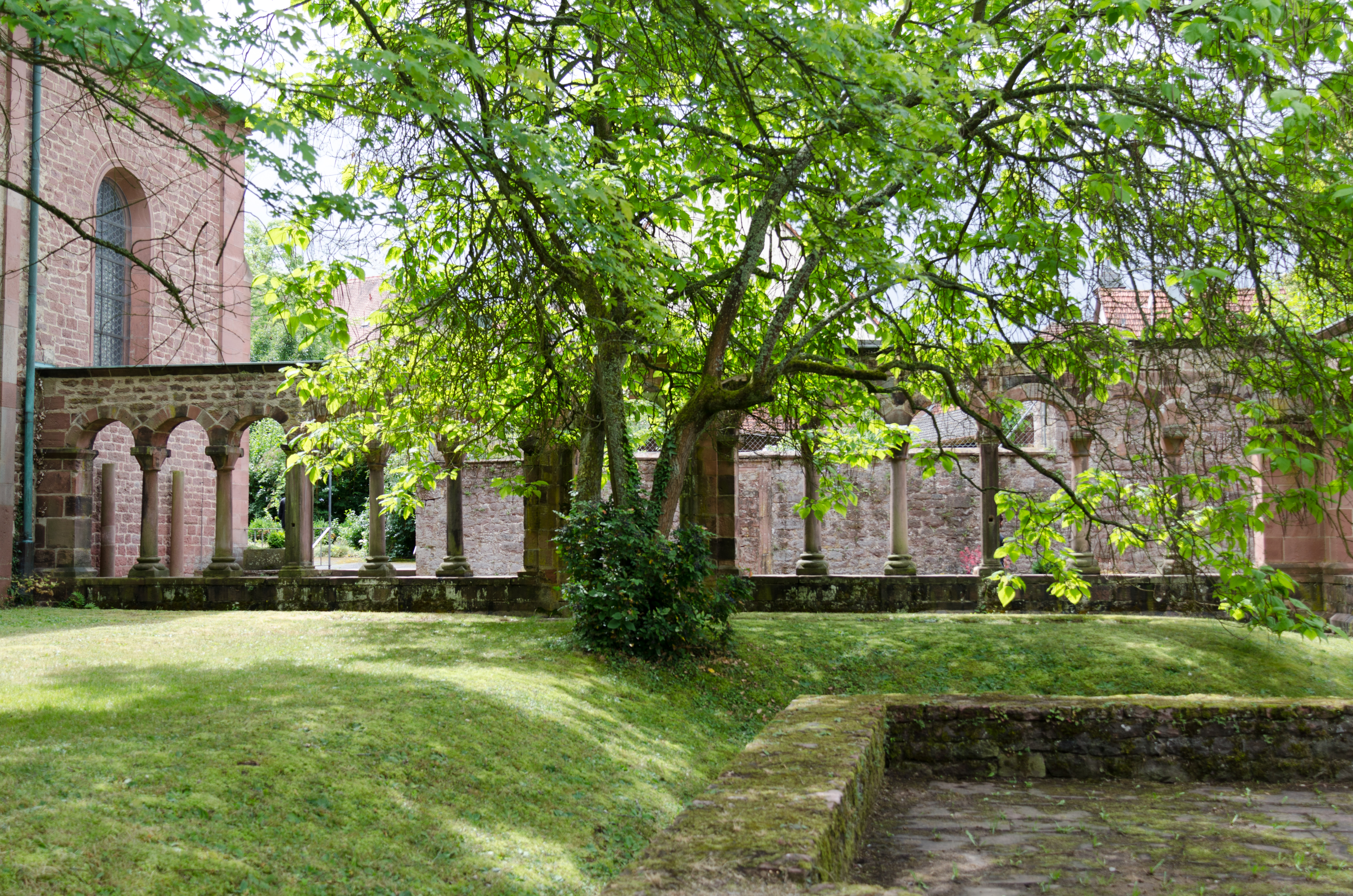
Cloister-like colonnade

During the struggles for independence, the abbey's position and wealth was repeatedly damaged by its Vögte, the lords of Grumbach (from 1243 the Counts of Rieneck). In 1148, Marquard von Grumbach built Rothenfels Castle on abbey land contrary to the abbot's wishes, but with support from the bishop. The Rieneck family also managed to take many rights and privileges from the abbey. In 1343, the bishop tried to force an administrator from a Würzburg monastery on the abbey. Depending on the power positions of emperor and bishop, the fortunes of the abbey changed. Emperor Charles IV supported the abbey, freeing it from the jurisdiction of the Würzburg Landgericht (court) and granted it a toll on the river Main.

However, despite these struggles the abbey was also successful in protecting and even expanding its territory in the face of rival feudal rulers like Rieneck, Würzburg and the Archbishop of Mainz, who held territory in the Spessart. It established two Probsteien: in 1264 at Einsiedel and in 1336 at Retzbach, where the Benedictines of Neustadt were also in charge of the important pilgrimage to Maria im Grünen Tal.

=== Early modern period ===
The abbey was sacked and its church desecrated during the Peasants' War in 1525. The church was rededicated in 1534/35.

In 1555, Johann Fries became abbot and converted to Lutheranism. When Friedrich von Wirsberg was made Prince-bishop of Würzburg in 1558 he immediately took steps and had all documents and charters of the abbey seized and brought to Würzburg, thus robbing the abbey of any means of legal defence.

Making use of this, when abbot Martin Knödler refused to rebuild the church for financial reasons, Prince-bishop Julius Echter deposed him, appointing Prior Valentin Minor as administrator in 1615. Echter forced the abbey to rebuild in 1615-23, causing it to incur substantial debts. The old monastery was demolished and replaced by new buildings, the church was rebuilt. Further damage followed in the Thirty Years' War, when the abbey was occupied by Swedish troops in 1633 and plundered twice (in 1636/37 and 1648). From 1632 to 1634 during the Swedish occupation of Franconia, the abbey became the property of Laurentius Gubben von Nabben. In 1635, six monks died during an outbreak of the plague.

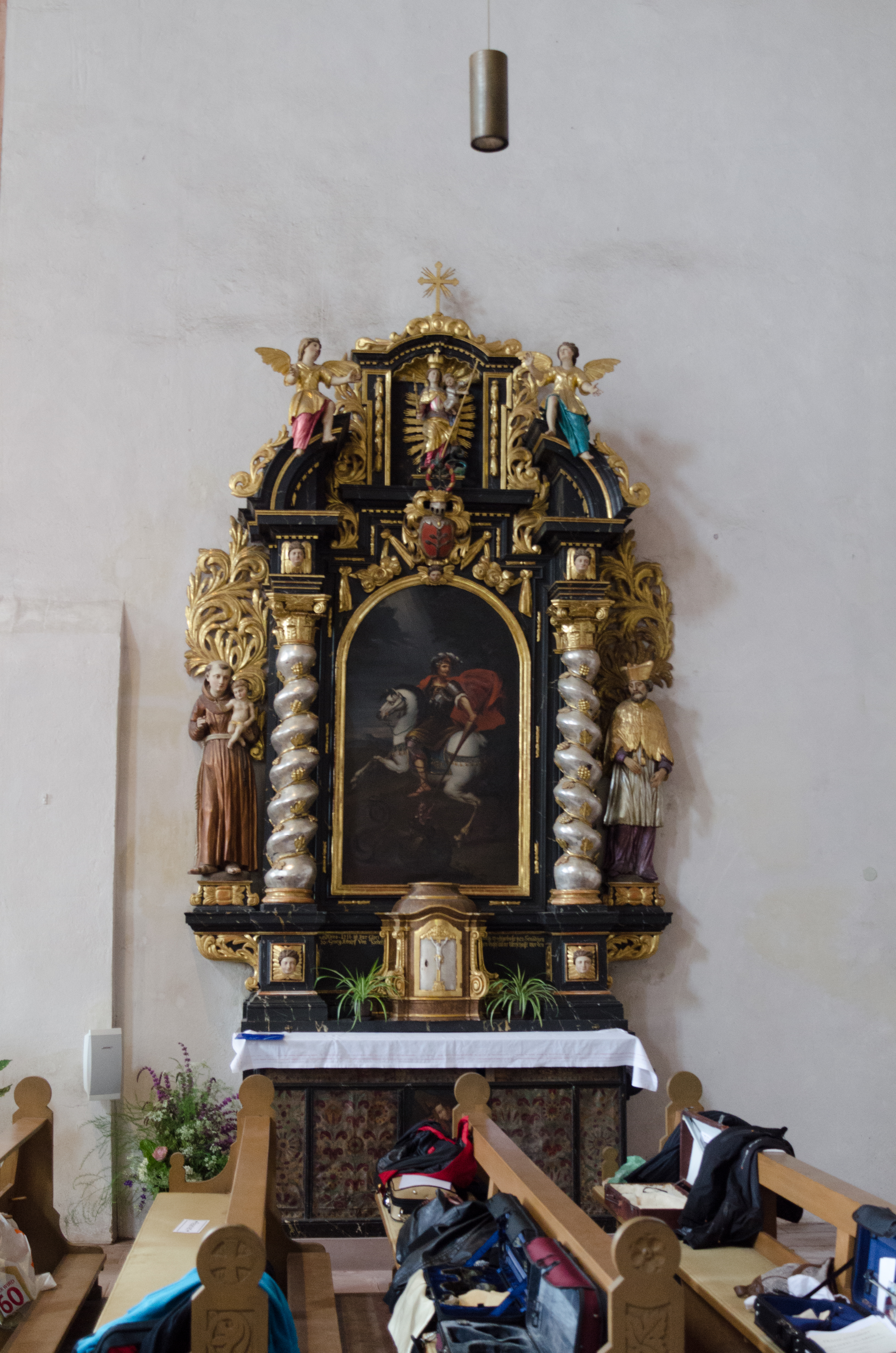
Baroque Georgsaltar from 1711 in the southern transept

A late flowering of the abbey and local arts and sciences came under abbot Bernhard Krieg (1703–29) who had many Baroque buildings in the area constructed. Under abbot Benedikt Lurz (1764–88) the long feud with Würzburg was finally settled.

=== Dissolution and later history ===
The last abbot, Johann Weigand (1788-1803) successfully led the abbey during the period of the French Revolutionary Wars. However, on 22 January 1803, the abbey was dissolved during secularization. 19 brothers and two novices were expelled. The abbey's properties were given to Prince Konstantin von Löwenstein-Wertheim-Rosenberg in compensation for losses of territory west of the Rhine.

In 1869-79, the parish church was rebuilt after its destruction by lightning in 1857. In 1907, what remained of the abbey buildings was taken over by nuns of the "Dominican Order of Saint Catherine of Siena" from South Africa. By the early 1960s, the monastery had been rebuilt.

== Structures ==
=== Parish church St. Michael und Gertrud ===
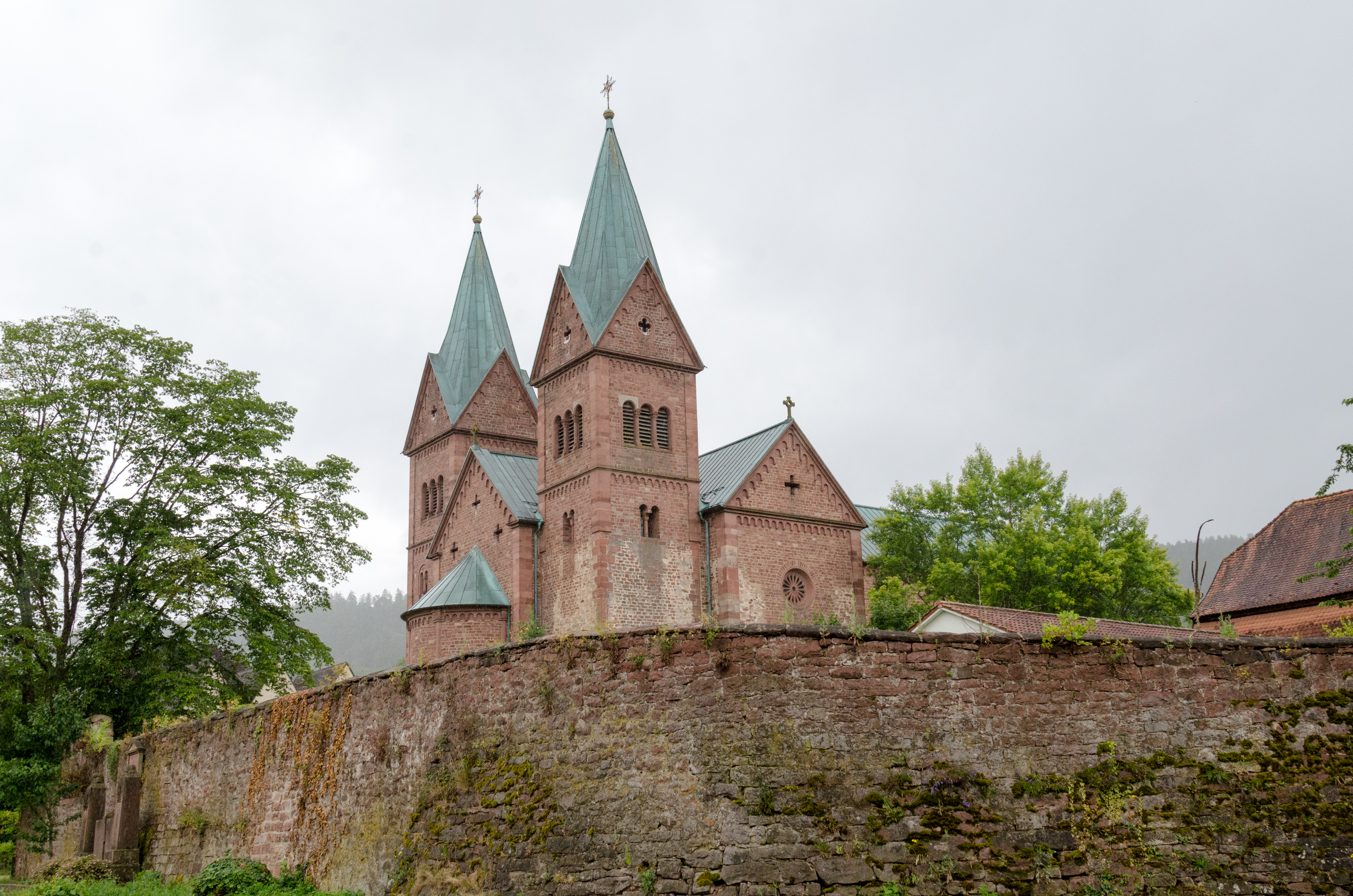
Exterior of the church with outer abbey wall

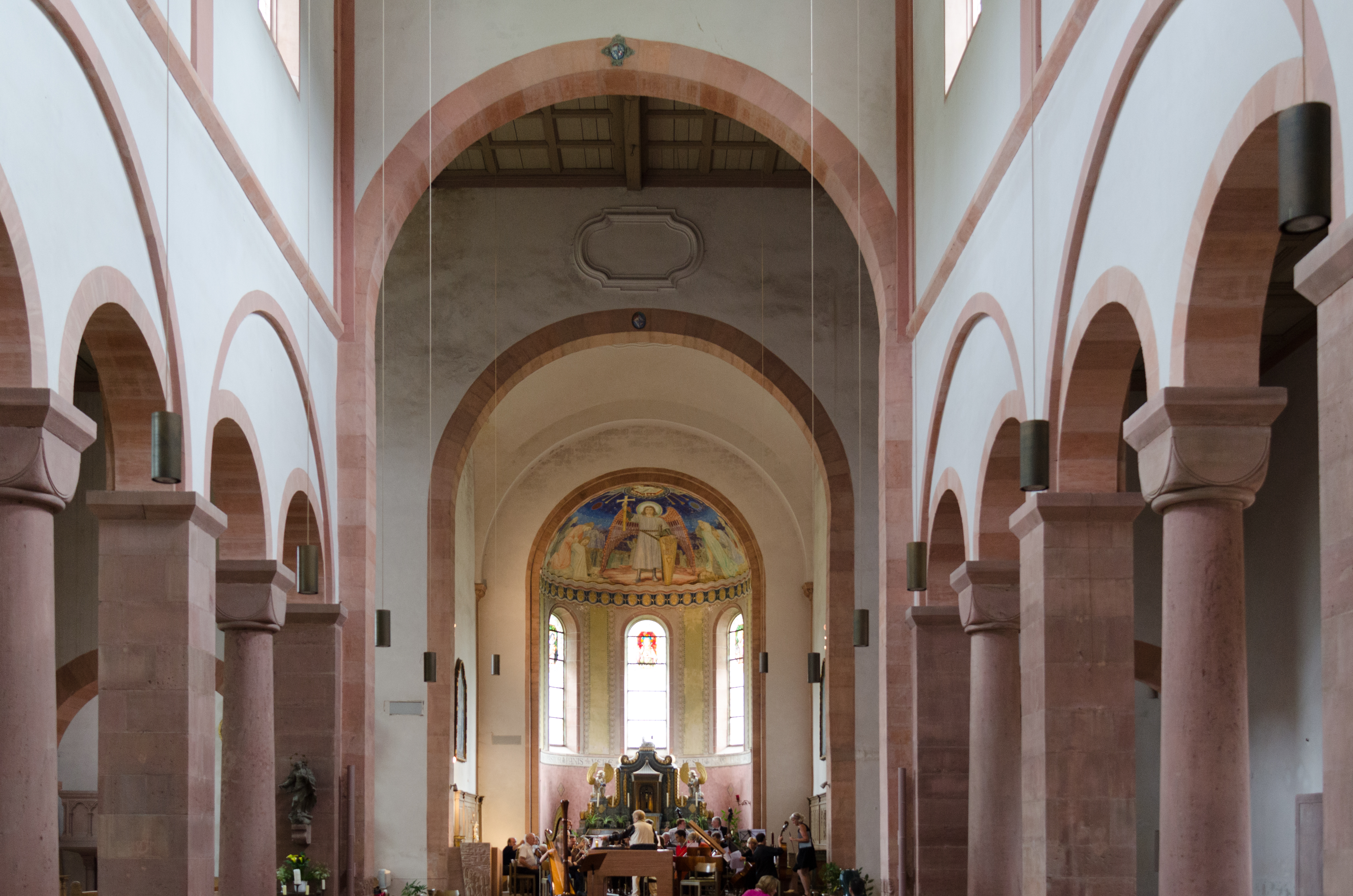
Interior of the church

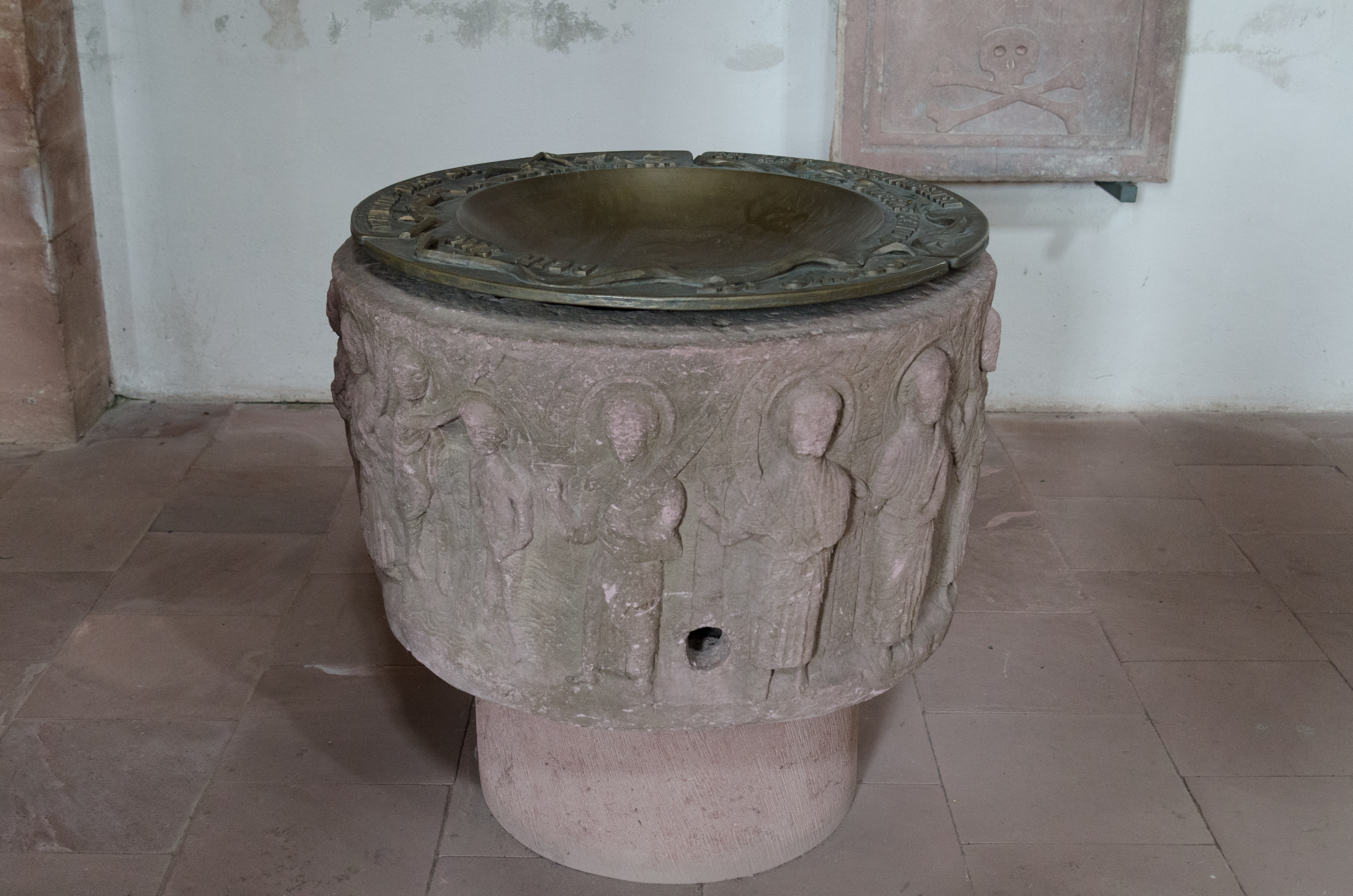
Replica of the baptismal font

The current parish church was formerly the abbey church St. Maria und St. Martin. Although findings indicate earlier structures in this location, the current building mostly dates from the early 12th century. It was built in Romanesque style from local sandstone.

Under abbot Krieg small changes were made and a choir and a sacristy added. Another renovation followed in 1837 under the Princes of Löwenstein-Wertheim. A fire caused by lightning destroyed the church and much of the monastic buildings around it in 1857. The church was subsequently reconstructed based on plans by Heinrich Hübsch in Romanesque Revival style, by builders Friedrich Wießler and Wilhelm Sentjens, and rededicated in 1879. Despite the substantial changes made at that point to the medieval structure, the church is considered one of the most important Romanesque buildings in the region.

The interior ornaments and the redesign of the apse followed in 1913/14. Father Riedmann, the priest at the time, had sold off various valuable Romanesque works of art to what is today the Mainfränkisches Museum at Würzburg (see Marienberg Fortress). In return, the church received plaster casts of the pieces, financial support and two paintings loaned from the Pinakothek at Munich. More renovation work (interior 1968/69, exterior 1989) followed.

Today, the church features numerous works of art, including Baroque altars and paintings, as well as late Romanesque reliefs/spolia and tombs from Gothic through Renaissance times. The Romanesque baptismal font (c. 1150) is present only as a copy. A Madonna figure attributed to the workshop of Tilman Riemenschneider can be found in the Marienkapelle. A small museum over the chapter hall contains additional pieces of art.

=== St. Peter und St. Paul ===
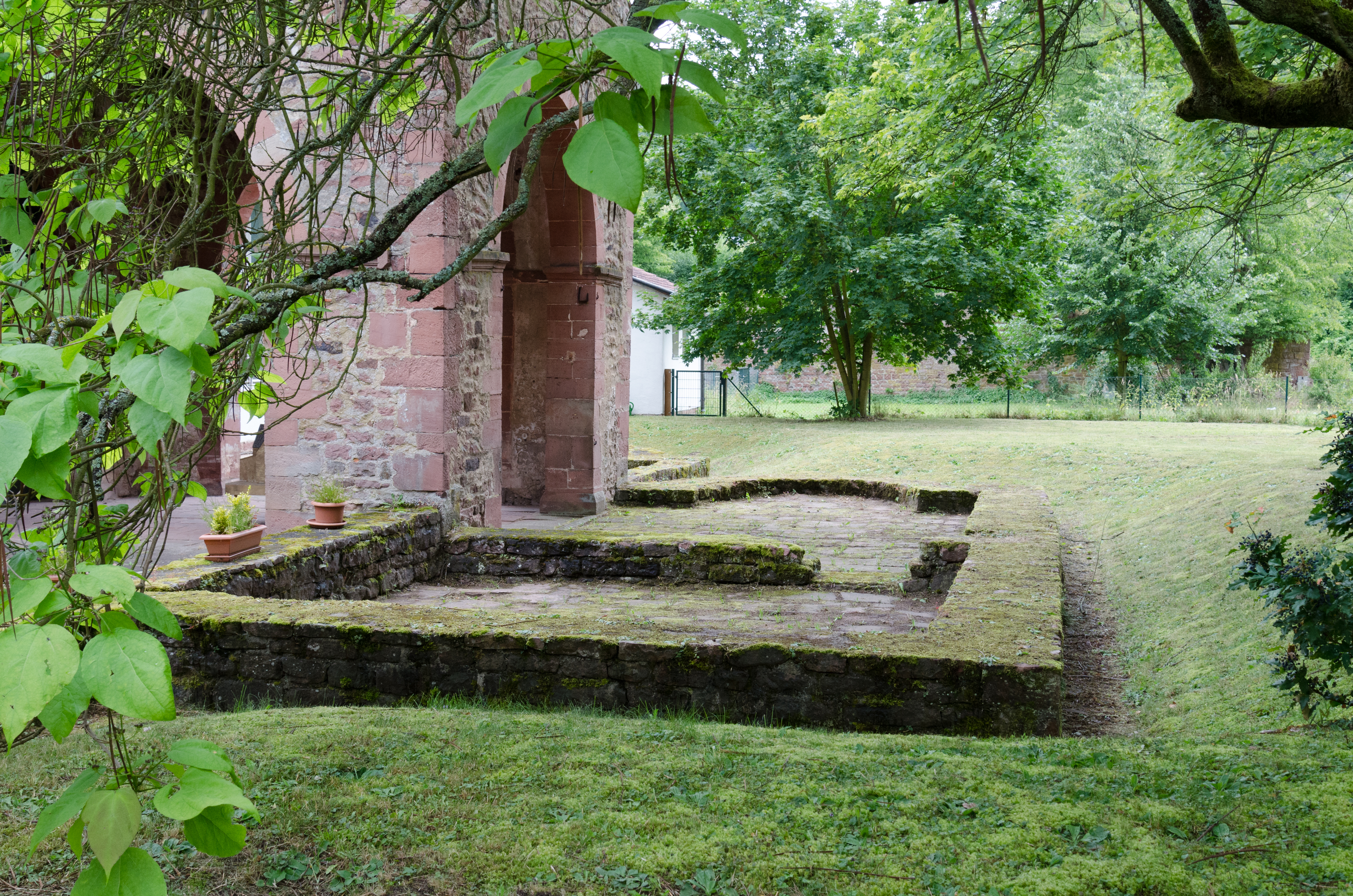
Chapel St. Peter und St. Paul

The location of the original abbey church from the 8th century is controversial. It may have been at the site of today's clergy house, where remains of a small church have been discovered. It may have been where the 12th-century church stands today. Or it may have been sited where larger foundations were excavated in 1968/69, north of the parish church.

These foundations are all that remains of the chapel of St. Peter und St. Paul. It possibly served as a first temporary chapel to the newly arrived monks, later expanded. However, the structures visible today are located on top of remains of a smaller and earlier church. They are thus unlikely to be Carolingian and are thought to date to the late 10th or early 11th century. A layer of ash may indicate that the earlier church was destroyed by fire, which could indicate a connection with the Hungarian raids of the 9th/10th century. St. Peter und St. Paul was redesigned in the early 12th century. The larger chapel was definitely used by the 17th century as a burial site for the local clergy. It was demolished in 1841. Due to 20th-century excavations, the foundations can now be viewed again.

=== Other central structures ===
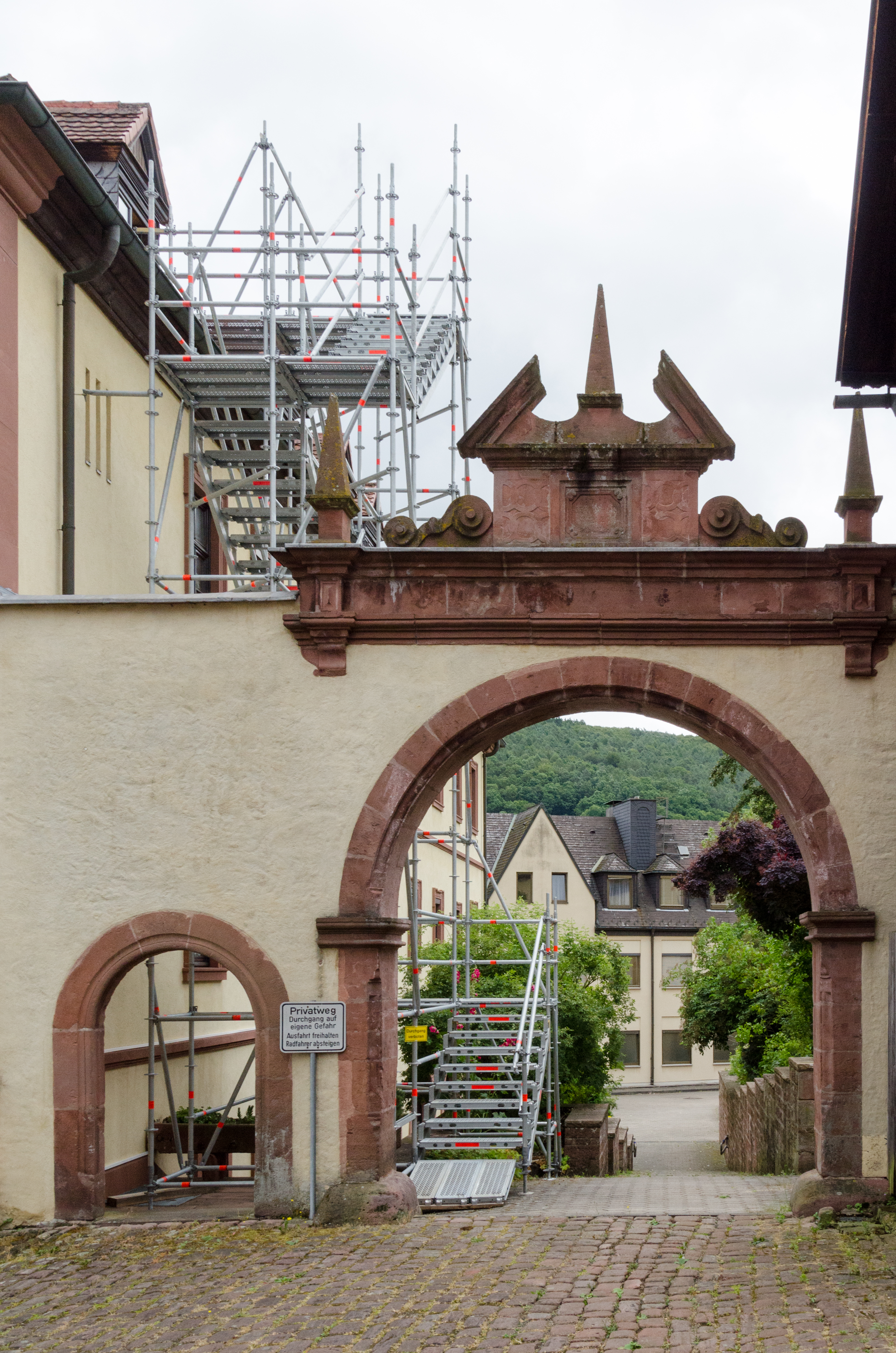
Abbey wall with Baroque archway

Almost nothing remains of the Romanesque monastery except a few pieces now in the small museum. The convent structures which burned down in 1857 were mostly from the period of Julius Echter. In 1960-62, the Dominican nuns replaced the demolished ruins of these buildings with new construction making use of the old foundations and even some masonry. The abbot's house (built after 1686) had been demolished in the early 19th century. One of the outer economic buildings (1717) survives, the others were reconstructed, in parts using old materials. They today house a rehab facility for people with psychiatric disorders. Around two-thirds of the enclosing wall with archway from 1719 remain. Of a French garden south of the abbey, only the summer house of the abbot and a well remain.

=== St. Michael and fortifications ===
St. Michael on the Michaelsberg mostly dates from the first half of the 13th century, with some significant alterations made in 1729-33. It stands on the foundations of two previous structures. The earlier one was an aisleless church with an apse to the east. The second, smaller one, had no choir and was likely half-timbered with no masonry foundations. The earlier chapel likely dates from the period 770-850.

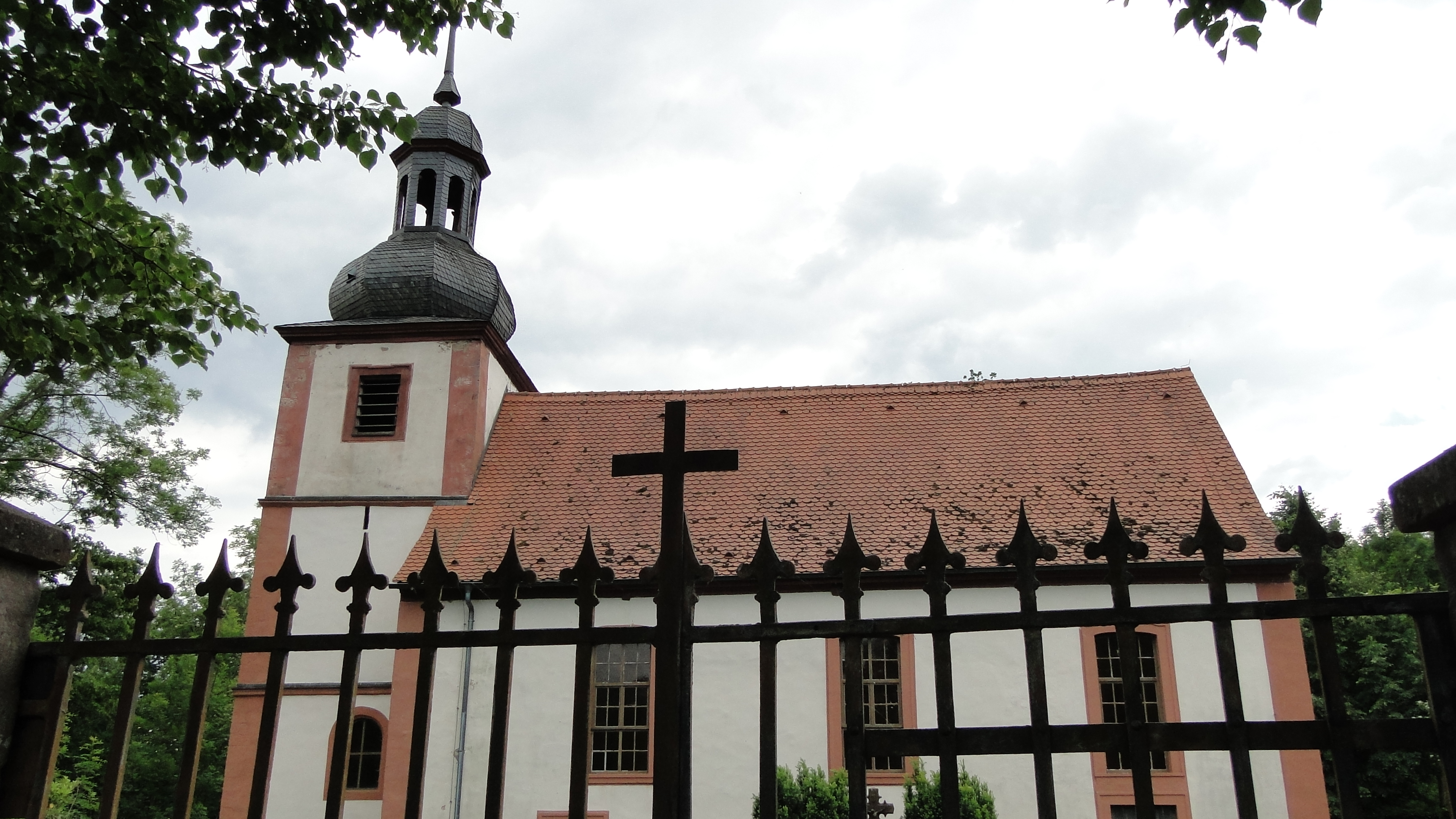
St. Michael chapel

The top of the hill is surrounded by an almost rectangular rampart measuring 120 m by 100 m. It was probably built between 770 and 850. and likely served as a retreat for the people of the village on the river as well as an outlook over the river, the Via Publica and the nearby Royal forest.

The hill has been the site of five archaeological excavations (1914, 1934, 1974, 1982/3 and 1988).

Until 1803, the Michaelskapelle was the parish church of Neustadt am Main. It then passed to the Löwenstein family. In 1978, it was gifted by Karl, Fürst zu Löwenstein to the municipality. The church was renovated in 1981-89. Today, the church serves as the cemetery chapel and is closed to the public.

=== Margarethenhof ===
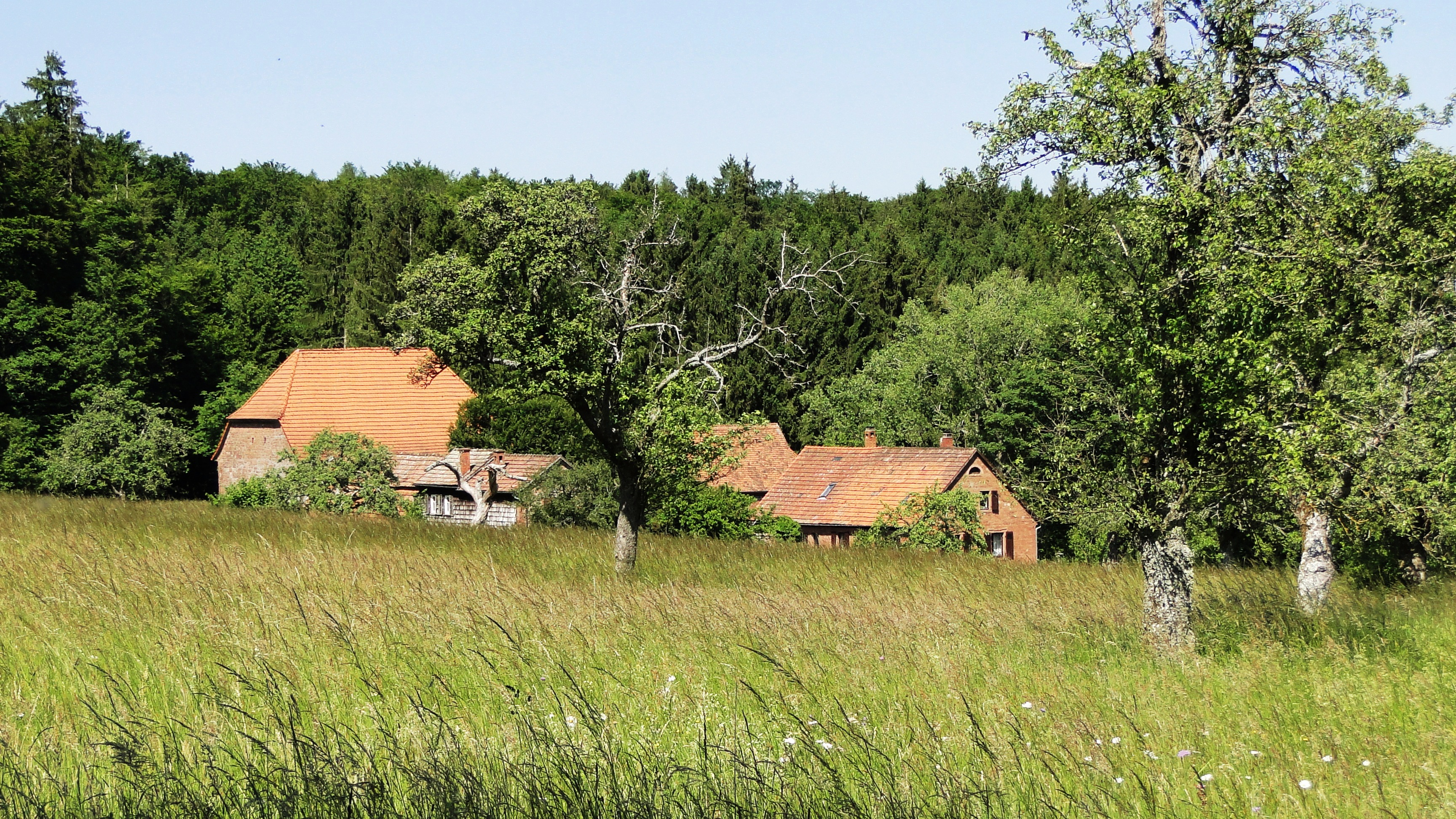
Margarethenhof

This farmyard is located on a hill around 3 kilometres from the abbey. The fields around it are completely enclosed by forest (Rodungsinsel). The area had been a property of the abbey since the Middle Ages. In 1803, it passed to the family of Löwenstein-Wertheim who remain its owners today. The structures (barn, house and chapel) date from the 12th century. A 17th-century choir replaced the Romanesque apse under abbot Krieg, whose coat-of-arms adorns the building. The chapel has been deconsecrated, but was dedicated to Saint Margaretha. A spring, which may have once been a pagan holy site, now known as Bischofsquell, is located next to it. In the post-World War II period, the Margarethenhof served as a local attraction, destination for day-trippers and site of festivities. It also hosted a tavern. Today, the farmyard and chapel are inaccessible to the public.

== See also ==
- List of Carolingian monasteries
