= Hermann Joha =

German television producer (born 1960)

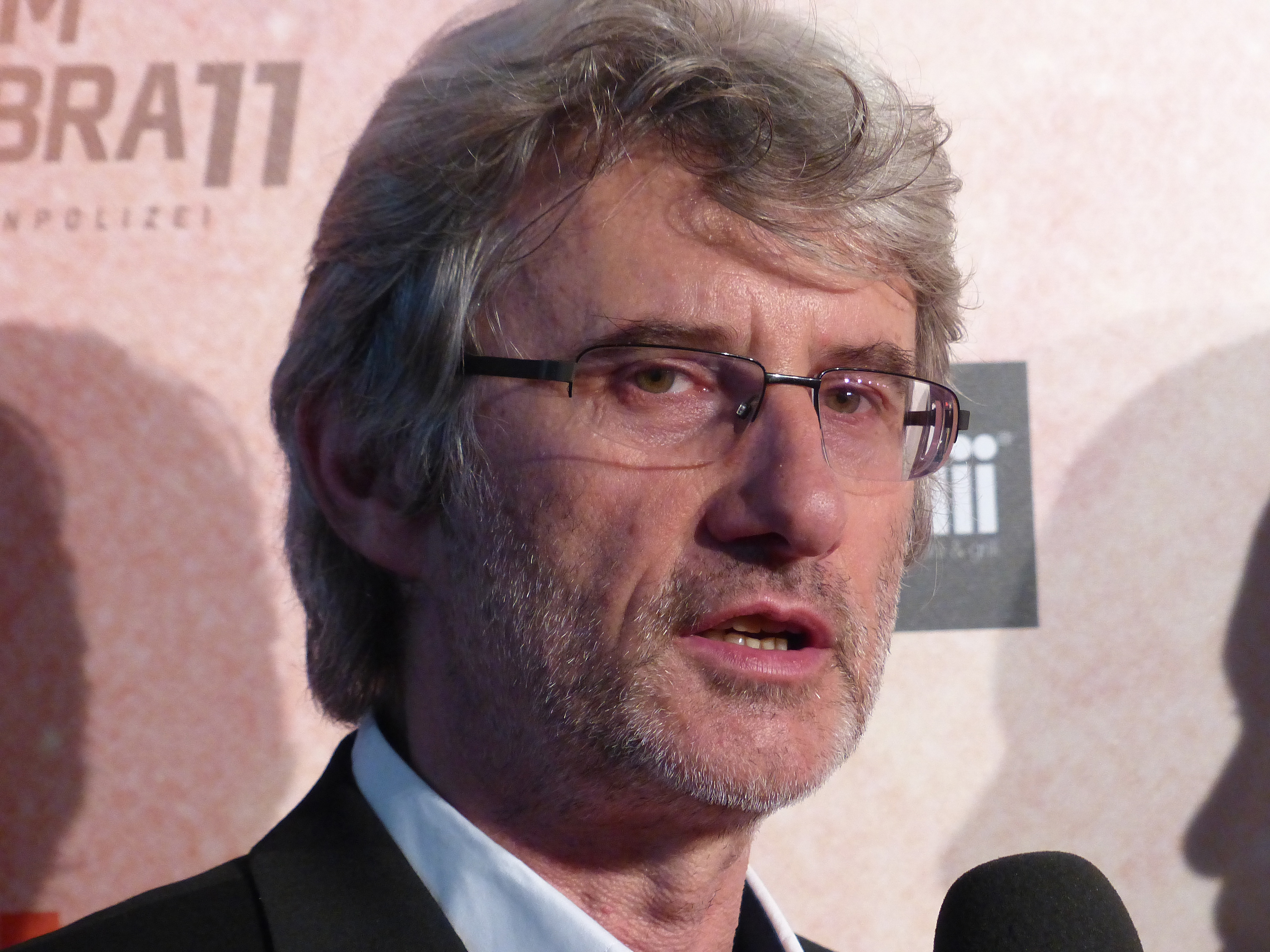
- Joha in 2016
- Born: 17 February 1960 (age 65); Lohr, Bavaria, Germany
- Occupation: Television producer
- Known for: Alarm für Cobra 11 – Die Autobahnpolizei

Hermann Joha (born 17 February 1960) is a German television producer.

== Career ==
Joha began his career as a stunt performer when he joined a British Hell Drivers team at the age of 17 years. Later he started working for German television. Eventually he became founder and CEO of TV production company action concept. When RTL Television was looking for an adequate second unit team in order to realise the German action TV series Alarm für Cobra 11 – Die Autobahnpolizei, they turned to action concept. Soon after Joha's company took over completely. Consequently action concept created several TV series including "Der Clown", "112 – Sie retten dein Leben" and "Lasko – Die Faust Gottes". In 2000 Joha was a Grimme-Preis nominee. His company action concept is a sevenfold Taurus World Stunt Award winner.

=== Accolades ===
Deutscher Fernsehpreis 2012
