= Rechtenbach =

- Municipality
- Coat of arms

- Location of Rechtenbach within Main-Spessart district
- Interactive map of Rechtenbach
- Location within Germany Location within Bavaria
- Coordinates: 49°59′N 9°30′E
- Country: Germany
- State: Bavaria
- Admin. region: Unterfranken
- District: Main-Spessart
- Municipal assoc.: Lohr am Main

Government
  - Mayor (2020–26): Christian Lang

Area
  - Total: 7.28 km^{2} (2.81 sq mi)
- Elevation: 338–530 m (1,109–1,739 ft)

Population (2025-12-31)
  - Total: 1,050
  - Density: 144/km^{2} (374/sq mi)
- Time zone: UTC+01:00 (CET)
  - Summer (DST): UTC+02:00 (CEST)
- Postal codes: 97848
- Dialling codes: 09352
- Vehicle registration: MSP
- Website: www.rechtenbach-spessart.de

Rechtenbach (German pronunciation: [ˈʁɛçtn̩bax]) is a municipality in the Main-Spessart district in the Regierungsbezirk of Lower Franconia (Unterfranken) in Bavaria, Germany and a member of the Verwaltungsgemeinschaft (municipal association) of Lohr am Main. It has a population of around 1,000.

== Geography ==
=== Location ===
Rechtenbach lies in der Würzburg Region in the Spessart (range) west of Lohr am Main. The village is located in the valley of the Rechtenbach, a tributary of the Main. It is surrounded by forest.

=== Subdivision ===
The community has two Gemarkungen (traditional rural cadastral area): Rechtenbach and (since January 2014) Rothenberg. The latter was an unincorporated area until 2013.

Until the merger with Rothenberg, the municipal territory was not continuous as it included the village and the separate Weickertshöhe or Weickertswiese, a meadow located on a nearby hill at an altitude of around 500 m. In between the two used to be forest that was part of Rothenberg.

=== Neighbouring communities ===
The municipal territory touches only on the community of Lohr. It also borders on two unincorporated areas, Partensteiner Forst and Forst Lohrerstraße.

== History ==
On 18 August 1522, Rechtenbach had its first documentary mention in a document from Count Philipp of Rieneck. It was an early modern industrial centre where plate glass was made for the mirrors of the Lohr State Manufacturer until 1791. As part of the Archbishopric of Mainz, Rechtenbach passed with the 1803 Reichsdeputationshauptschluss to the newly formed Principality of Aschaffenburg, with which it passed in 1814 (by this time it had become a department of the Grand Duchy of Frankfurt) to the Kingdom of Bavaria. In the course of administrative reform in Bavaria, the current community came into being with the Gemeindeedikt ("Municipal Edict") of 1818.

== Demographics ==
Within town limits, 1,158 inhabitants were counted in 1970, 1,107 in 1987, 1,096 in 2000 and in 2004 1,059.

== Economy ==
Municipal taxes in 1999 amounted to €459,000 (converted), of which net business taxes amounted to €30,000.

According to official statistics, there were 30 workers on the social welfare contribution rolls working in producing businesses in 1998. In trade and transport this was 0. In other areas, 22 workers on the social welfare contribution rolls were employed, and 477 such workers worked from home. There were 14 processing businesses. Two businesses were construction-related, and furthermore, in 1999, there were 7 agricultural operations with a working area of 55 ha, of which 55 ha was meadowland.

== Governance ==
The mayor is Christian Lang (Bürgerliste), elected in 2020.

=== Coat of arms ===
The community's arms might be described thus: Gules a beam hewer's axe and a glassblower's pipe with glass surmounting the axe in saltire argent, in chief a fleur-de-lis stalked Or, in base an oakleaf in pale of the last.

As mentioned under History, Rechtenbach was a glassmaking centre. This craft blossomed particularly in the 17th century, when French glassblowers took over at the Rechtenbach glassworks. These craftsmen are recalled in the arms by the fleur-de-lis and the glassblower's pipe. When the glassworks shut down for good in 1791, many villagers worked as wood hewers and sleeper sawyers while the railway was being built. This is represented in the arms by the beam hewer's axe. The oakleaf stands for the community's geographical location in the Spessart and also represents wood's importance to the local economy. The tinctures gules and argent (red and silver) refer to the former lordship, which was held by Electoral Mainz.

The arms have been borne since 1989.

== Infrastructure ==
Rechtenbach lies on the Bundesstrasse 26.

== Education ==
As of 1999, there was a Kindergarten with 50 places at Rechtenbach.
