= Indramat =

Former German industrial control firm

Indramat GmbH.
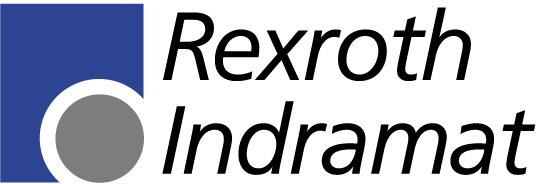
- Company type: GmbH
- Industry: Factory automation
- Founded: Neuwied (am Rhein), Germany (1958)
- Defunct: 2001
- Fate: Acquired
- Successor: Bosch Rexroth Electric Drives and Controls
- Headquarters: Lohr am Main, Germany
- Area served: Worldwide
- Products: Industrial Control Systems
- Number of employees: 1,500 (2001)

Indramat GmbH, now part of Bosch Rexroth, was an industrial control firm founded in 1958, based in Neuwied (am Rhein), Germany. Its name is a German abbreviation meaning “Gesellschaft zur INDustrialisierung-RAtionalisierung und AutoMATisierung“ (Association for Industrialization, Rationalization, and Automation).

The core business was the production of industrial servo drives and motion controls for use on machine tools, machine presses, printing presses, food packaging machinery, as well as assembly lines and material handling equipment.

Indramat was acquired by the hydraulic company Rexroth in 1965, for Rexroth to gain competence in machine control. At that time, Indramat was moved to the German town of Lohr am Main, Rexroth’s headquarters. In 1968 Rexroth, including Indramat GmbH, was taken over by Mannesmann AG. In 2001, after the hostile takeover of Mannesmann by Vodafone, the industrial portion of Mannesmann was acquired by Robert Bosch GmbH, including Rexroth and Indramat. The new entity was named Bosch Rexroth, and Indramat GmbH became the Electric Drives and Controls Technology Group under Bosch Rexroth. The name Indramat was no longer used, however Bosch Rexroth Electric Drives and Controls continues to produce and support products originally marketed under the Indramat brand, and newer product families such as the IndraDrive, IndraDyn, and IndraControl are named in recognition of their heritage.

In 2001 Indramat employed 1,500, with a turnover of 261 million Euro. Exports constituted 52% of the business.

Indramat gained recognition in Germany and Central Europe starting in the 1970s as a supplier of DC servo drives and control systems, especially in the areas of sheet steel processing, and 3-dimensional tracing controls. A key feature of the Indramat servo is the programming module (called a “Personality Module” in the North American market), which contained all variable settings required to match the servo amplifier with a given motor. This feature greatly simplified the commissioning process. In 1979 Indramat released a brushless drive servo system, which it branded as an “AC Servo”. This product gained acceptance in automotive industry Powertrain manufacturing, bringing Indramat global recognition.

Indramat is also recognized for distributed CNCs for automotive Powertrain manufacturing, and electronic line shaft technology for commercial printing presses.
