= Steinfeld, Bavaria =

Steinfeld
- Municipality
- Coat of arms

- Location of Steinfeld within Main-Spessart district
- Interactive map of Steinfeld
- Location within Germany Location within Bavaria
- Coordinates: 49°57′5″N 9°40′16″E
- Country: Germany
- State: Bavaria
- Admin. region: Unterfranken
- District: Main-Spessart
- Municipal assoc.: Lohr am Main

Government
  - Mayor (2020–26): Günter Koser

Area
  - Total: 33.69 km^{2} (13.01 sq mi)
- Elevation: 277 m (909 ft)

Population (2025-12-31)
  - Total: 2,079
  - Density: 61.71/km^{2} (159.8/sq mi)
- Time zone: UTC+01:00 (CET)
  - Summer (DST): UTC+02:00 (CEST)
- Postal codes: 97854
- Dialling codes: 09359
- Vehicle registration: MSP
- Website: www.steinfeld-msp.de

Steinfeld (German pronunciation: [ˈʃtaɪnˌfɛlt]) is a municipality in the Main-Spessart district in the Regierungsbezirk of Lower Franconia (Unterfranken) in Bavaria, Germany, and a member of the Verwaltungsgemeinschaft (Administrative Community) of Lohr am Main.

Spoken here is an East Franconian dialect (according to the Language Atlas of the Bavarian Library, Lower East Franconian). The inhabitants are often called Steeflder Russe in the local area.

== Geography ==
=== Location ===
Steinfeld lies between Lohr am Main and Karlstadt on the Fränkische Platte (a flat, mostly agricultural region), in the zone where the geology changes from bunter- to Muschelkalk-based.

The greater part of the municipal area is even today used for agriculture. Furthermore, the community also manages considerable woodlands, being in the outermost foothills of the Spessart, which borders on the west. Most workers commute to jobs in nearby towns such as Lohr, Karlstadt and Würzburg.

=== Constituent communities ===
Steinfeld's outlying Ortsteile are Hausen and Waldzell.

The community has the following Gemarkungen (traditional rural cadastral areas): Hausen, Steinfeld, Waldzell.

== History ==
In 812, Steinfeld had its first documentary mention. In documents from that time, it is styled Steinvelt im Waldsassengove (that is, the Waldsassengau, a mediaeval territorial unit).

About 1200, Steinfeld had already become an independent parish. The Neustadt am Main Monastery raised entitlements to tithes. About 1336, the parish church was incorporated into the monastery, then known as Nuwenstat.

In 1614, new building work on the Parish Church of the Assumption of Mary was completed. In 1842 came an expansion to the nave.

As part of the Princely Electorate (Hochstift) of Würzburg (Amt of Rothenfels), Steinfeld passed with the 1803 Reichsdeputationshauptschluss to the Counts of Löwenstein-Wertheim. In 1806 it became a Baden mediatized Amt, which in 1819 was ceded to Austria, which then ceded it to Bavaria.

The community today includes the outlying centres of Hausen (amalgamated in 1972) and Waldzell (1978).

The Ortsteil of Waldzell (formerly: Cella/Zell) is believed to have likewise arisen in the 9th century as a Neustadt monastic outpost (a “cell”). There are historical references to Saint Gertrude. The Gertraudenkapelle (chapel) was built over a spring named for her (in 1616 by Julius Echter, expansion about 1849). The building of Saint Vitus’s Church came about in 1612 on Julius Echter’s orders.

From the Ortsteil of Hausen came the peasant leader Kaspar Leyser. He, along with two further rebellious peasants, was beheaded in June 1525 in Karlstadt.

=== Population development ===
Within town limits, 1,991 inhabitants were counted in 1970, 2,060 in 1987 and in 2000 2,277.

== Politics ==
The mayor is Günter Koser (in Steinfeld supported by the CSU and the Bürgerblock as well as by the voters’ communities of Hausen and Waldzell).

Municipal taxes in 1999 amounted to €1,347,000 (converted), of which net business taxes amounted to €476,000.

=== Town partnerships ===
- Chauvigné, Ille-et-Vilaine, France since 1992

Regular biennial visits have already built strong German-French friendships through this partnership

=== Coat of arms ===
The community's arms might be described thus: Vert in base an inescutcheon argent, thereon an uncial N on which a small cross pattée sable, issuant from the inescutcheon Saint Sebastian proper with nimbus of the second and arrows of the same, one piercing him to the forearm sinister, another to the heart, and two in his hand dexter held in saltire, points to base, in chief dexter an inescutcheon dancetty of three gules and argent, in chief sinister an inescutcheon Or with a bend gules.

An 18th-century seal survives which shows Saint Sebastian, who has become a charge in the modern arms. The N with the small cross was a symbol used by the Neustadt am Main Monastery, and recalls Steinfeld's history as a Neustadt holding. The heraldic pattern seen in the inescutcheon on the dexter (armsbearer's right, viewer's left) side, the so-called Franconian rake, refers to the Prince-Bishopric (Hochstift) of Würzburg, under whose ownership Steinfeld lay until the Old Empire came to an end in 1803. The other inescutcheon, on the sinister (armsbearer's left, viewer's right) side is the arms borne by the House of Baden and recalls the short time up until 1819 when the community was part of the Grand Duchy of Baden.

The arms have been borne since 1982.

== Economy and infrastructure ==
According to official statistics, there were 192 workers on the social welfare contribution rolls working in producing businesses in 1998. In trade and transport this was 52. In other areas, 879 such workers worked from home. There were 3 processing businesses. Three businesses were in construction, and furthermore, in 1999, there were 77 agricultural operations with a working area of 1 887 ha, of which 1 666 ha was cropland and 206 ha was meadowland.

=== Education ===
In 1999 the following institutions existed in Steinfeld:

- Kindergartens: 100 spaces with 93 children
- Primary schools: 1 with 7 teachers and 124 pupils
