= Lohr am Main =

Place in Bavaria, Germany

Lohr a.Main Loa
- Town
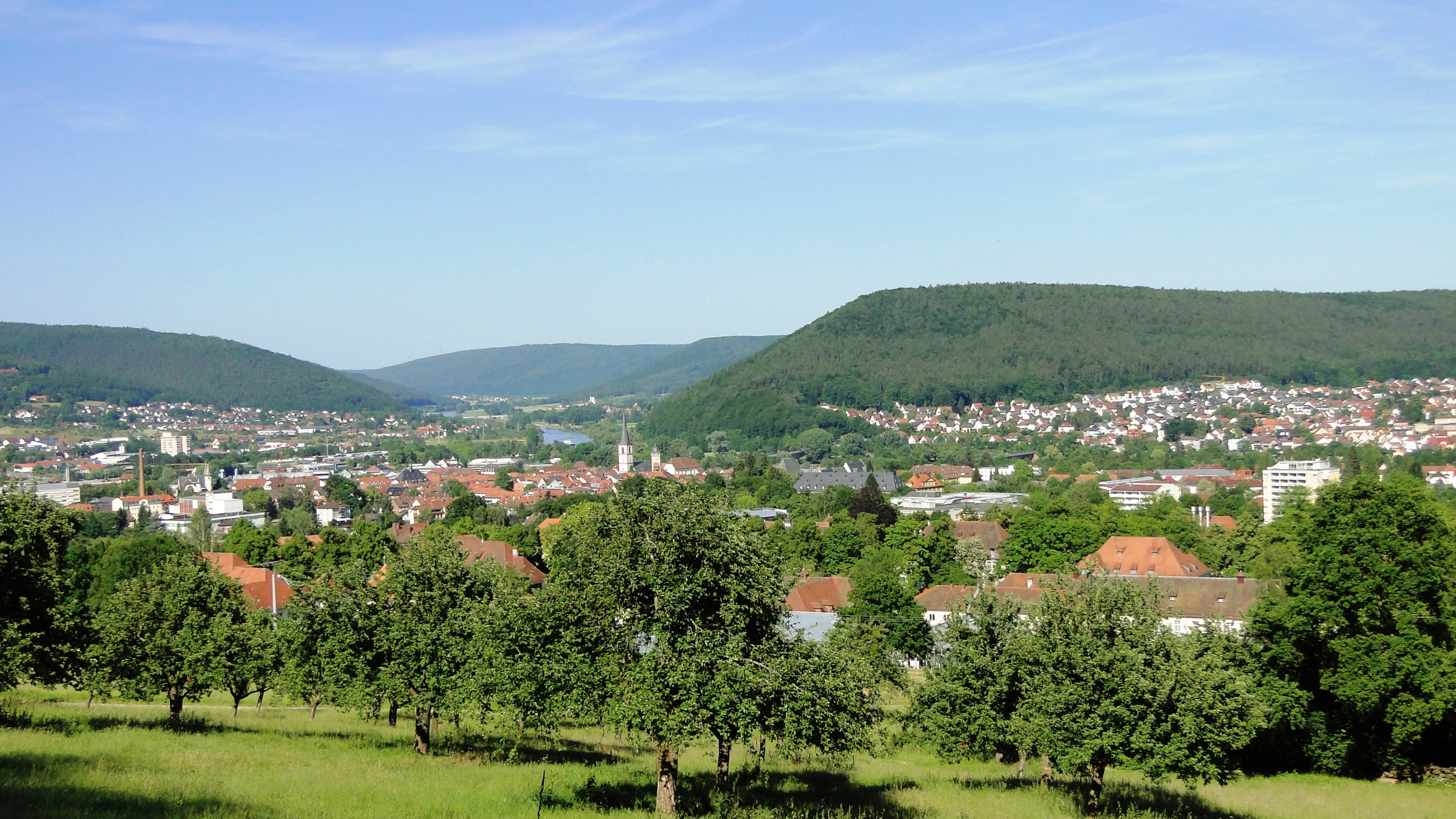
- Lohr (left) and Sendelbach (right), viewed from the Lohrer Alm

- Coat of arms

- Location of Lohr a.Main; Loa within Main-Spessart district
- Interactive map of Lohr a.Main; Loa
- Location within Germany Location within Bavaria
- Coordinates: 50°0′N 09°35′E
- Country: Germany
- State: Bavaria
- Admin. region: Unterfranken
- District: Main-Spessart
- Subdivisions: 10 Stadtteile

Government
  - Mayor (2020–26): Mario Paul (Ind.)

Area
  - Total: 90.42 km^{2} (34.91 sq mi)
- Elevation: 160–350 m (520–1,150 ft)

Population (2025-12-31)
  - Total: 14,964
  - Density: 165.5/km^{2} (428.6/sq mi)
- Time zone: UTC+01:00 (CET)
  - Summer (DST): UTC+02:00 (CEST)
- Postal codes: 97816
- Dialling codes: 09352
- Vehicle registration: MSP
- Website: www.lohr.de

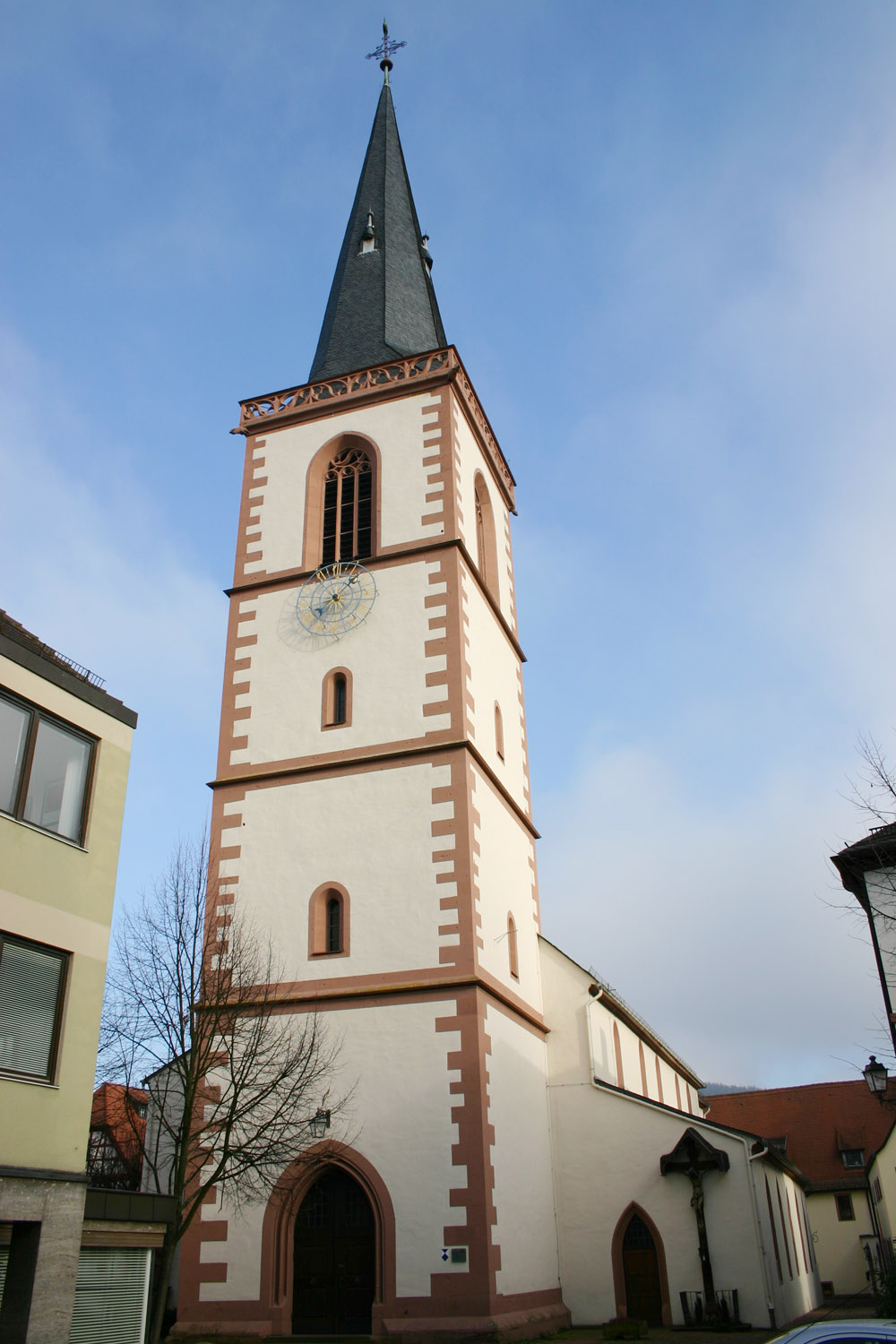
The town's parish church, St. Michael

Lohr am Main (German pronunciation: [ˈloːɐ̯ ʔam ˈmaɪn], lit. 'Lohr on the Main'; officially: Lohr a.Main) or Loa (Bavarian: Loa) is a town in the Main-Spessart district in the Regierungsbezirk of Lower Franconia (Unterfranken) in Bavaria, Germany and the seat (but not a member) of the Verwaltungsgemeinschaft (municipal association) of Lohr am Main. It has a population of around 15,000.

== Etymology ==
The town takes its name from the eponymous river that flows into the Main in the municipality. The addition "am Main" distinguishes it from other towns also named Lohr.

Past ways of spelling the name include:

- 1296 Lare
- 1331 Lore
- 1342 Lor
- 1526 Lohr
- 1573 Loarn
- 1747 Lahr
- 1831 Lohr
- 1946 Lohr am Main

== Geography ==
=== Location ===
The municipal territory extends on both banks of the Main about halfway between Würzburg and Aschaffenburg in Lower Franconia. The town of Lohr lies on the eastern slope of the Spessart at a bend in the river Main, which swings towards the south here, forming the beginning of the Mainviereck ("Main Square" – the southern part of the Spessart). In Lohr, the river Lohr empties into the Main. Perhaps for its geographical location or the fact that two major valleys lead into the interior of the range, the town is known as the "Gateway to the Spessart" (Tor zum Spessart).

The Main river valley is steep with an elevation change from 160 m above sea level at Gemünden dropping to 100 m above sea level at Hanau. The river Main in its natural state is a fast-moving stream unsuitable for shipping. In the 19th century the river was tamed and a system of dams and locks is now part of the Rhine-Main-Danube Canal connecting the North Sea with the Black Sea.

=== Geology ===
The bedrock, with a depth of about 400 m, is made up mainly of sedimentary minerals. In the Spessart is found a great deal of bunter. This geological plain with a slight slope to the southeast is the product of a large continental sea that drained owing to a tectonic shift. In the east, the range is abutted by the Fränkische Platte (a flat, mostly agricultural region), whose geology is mainly Muschelkalk-based.

The sandstone bedrock with strata of loess and clay in conjunction with an extensive forest provide for excellent water quality of the springs and groundwater of the region. The people of Lohr thus enjoy high-quality drinking water. Currently, large amounts of this water are pumped to areas as far away as Würzburg.

=== Subdivisions ===
Lohr am Main's Stadtteile are Halsbach, Lindig, Pflochsbach, Rodenbach, Ruppertshütten, Sackenbach, Sendelbach, Steinbach and Wombach.

The town has the following Gemarkungen (traditional rural cadastral areas): Halsbach, Lohr a. Main, Pflochsbach, Rodenbach, Ruppertshütten, Sackenbach, Sendelbach, Steinbach, Wombach.

Moreover, the town of Lohr am Main also owns plots of land within other municipalities, namely Partenstein, Gemünden am Main and Rechtenbach.

=== Neighbouring communities ===
Clockwise from the north, these are Partenstein, Frammersbach, Flörsbachtal, Fellen, Burgsinn, Rieneck, Neuendorf, Gemünden am Main, Karlstadt, Steinfeld, Neustadt am Main and Rechtenbach.

== History ==
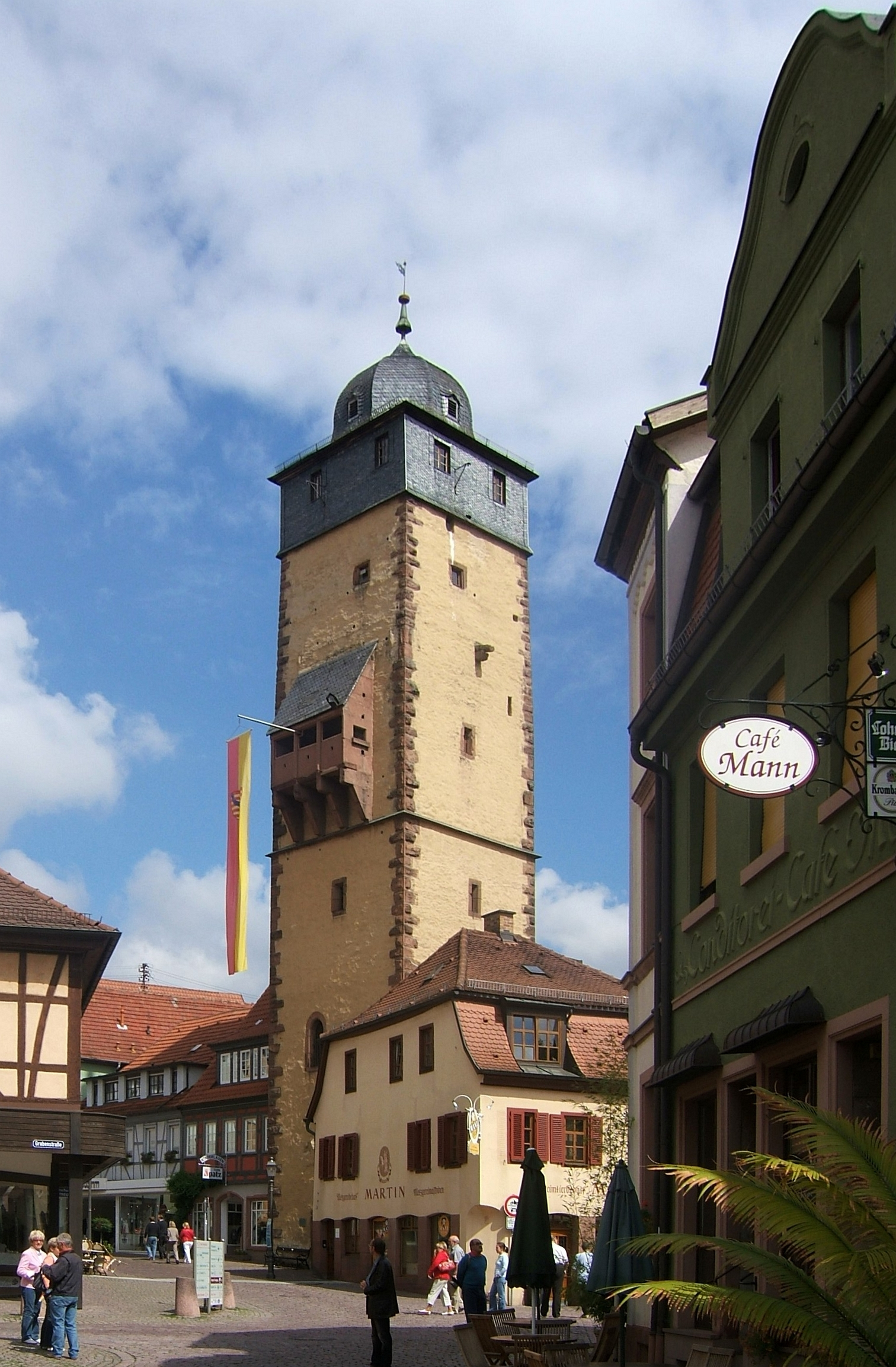
The Bayersturm

The town of Lohr am Main was settled no later than the 8th century, and by the time of its first documentary mention in 1295 it was already the main centre of the County of Rieneck.

In 1333 Lohr was granted town rights, which can be explained by the disagreement about the inheritance of the Counts of Rieneck-Rothenfels, which had died out. Indeed, Lohr had been a "town" for quite some time already. The town lords were the Counts of Rieneck, who had been enfeoffed by the Archbishop of Mainz (evidence of this is only available beginning in 1366).

In 1559, after the last Count of Rieneck, Philipp III’s death, the fief passed to the Archbishopric of Mainz. From 1603 to 1618, during the "Recatholization" many townsfolk fell victim to persecution as witches. The former Oberamt of the Prince-Bishopric of Würzburg was secularized in favour of Prince Primate von Dalberg's Principality of Aschaffenburg and passed along with this state in 1814 (by this time it had become a part of the Grand Duchy of Frankfurt) to the Kingdom of Bavaria. In the course of administrative reform in Bavaria, the current town-level municipality came into being with the Gemeindeedikt ("Municipal Edict") of 1818.

In 1875, the Alte Mainbrücke (old Main bridge) was built. In 1936 came the new Lindig neighbourhood. In 1939, Sendelbach was amalgamated with the town.

Between 1940 and 1945, under Nazi rule more than 600 children, women and men were deported to Sonnenstein and Grafeneck, as well as to the Auschwitz and Mauthausen concentration camps from what was then the Health and Care Institute (now the Regional Hospital for Psychiatry) as part of the Euthanasia programme, "Action T4". Since 1993, a bronze relief in the street by artist Rainer Stoltz serves as a memorial to these victims of the Nazi régime.

On 2 April 1945, Lohr citizen Karl Brand was murdered, because he wanted to surrender the town to American troops without a fight. Since 1979, a memorial stone has recalled this.

From 1972 to 1978, the surrounding communities of Halsbach, Rodenbach, Ruppertshütten, Sackenbach, Steinbach, Wombach and Pflochsbach were amalgamated with the town. On 1 July 1972, the greater part of the District of Lohr (Landkreis Lohr) became part of the new District of Mittelmain (Landkreis Mittelmain), which in 1973 was given its current name, Main-Spessart. At first, Lohr am Main was chosen as the district seat (Kreisstadt), but in October 1972 it was decided that Karlstadt would be the new district seat, and the Landratsamt (district office) was moved from Lohr to Karlstadt.

== Economy ==
Lohr am Main is economically the most important centre in the Main-Spessart district. Out of some 12,000 workers on the social welfare contribution rolls working in town, only some 5,500 actually live in Lohr. The greater number of roughly 6,200 workers commute each day to Lohr. Comparing Lohr am Main with the district seat of Karlstadt, Lohr's importance stands out even more sharply. Although both towns have roughly the same population, Lohr am Main has about three times as many jobs. The greater number of jobs and the number of large businesses in town are also reflected in per-capita tax revenue: in 2005, this was about €1,000.

=== Economic structure ===
The most important industries are hydraulic machinery, electronics manufacturing as well as wood and glass processing. In addition, there are a large number of craftsmen's businesses.

Important employers in Lohr are:

- Bosch Rexroth AG (hydraulics, engine building and automation technology) with 6,620 employees, including the former Indramat
- Bezirkskrankenhaus Lohr (hospital for psychiatry, psychotherapy and psychosomatic medicine) with 607 employees
- Gerresheimer Lohr GmbH (specialty glass and plastics) with 350 employees
- ATY Automotive & Industrial Components GmbH with 250 employees
- Nikolaus Sorg GmbH & Co KG (glass processing) with 165 employees
- Walter Hunger KG (hydraulic components) with 160 employees
- OWI Oskar Winkler GmbH & Co.KG (wooden and plastic mouldings) with 120 employees

The local unemployment rate is less than 3%.

=== Logging ===
The town of Lohr am Main is, with its more than 6,300 ha of woodland (of which around 4,000 ha are municipally owned) Bavaria's second largest municipal forest owner. The town's woodlands are a mixed broadleaf forest managed under the precepts of the Arbeitsgemeinschaft Naturgemäße Waldwirtschaft (ANW, "Natural Forest Management Working Group"). Since 2000, the town's forest has been certified according to the Forest Stewardship Council's (FSC) criteria.

== Arts and culture ==
=== Museums ===
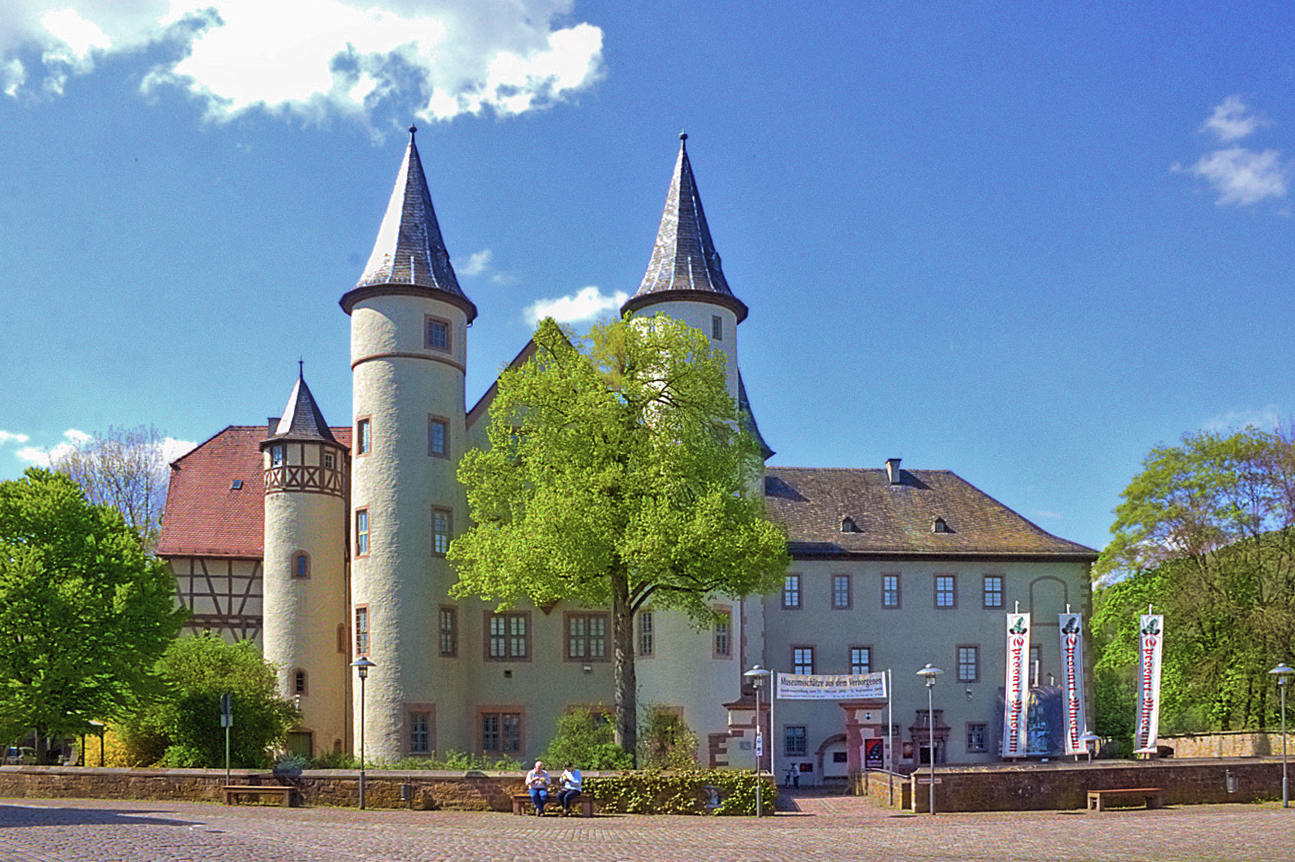
The Lohrer Schloss

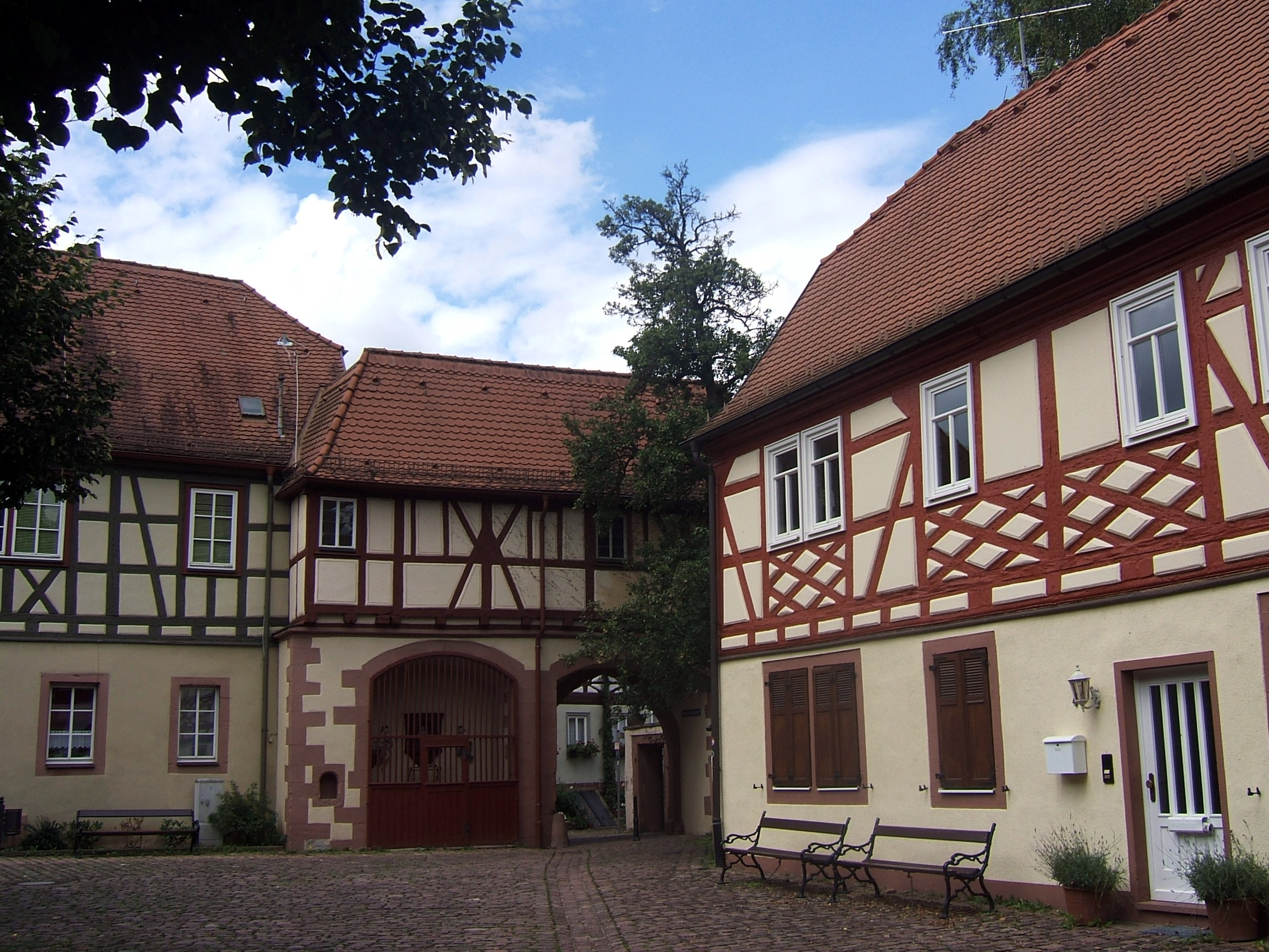
Small churchyard gate

The Lohrer Schloss houses the Spessartmuseum. It deals mainly with economics and handicrafts, but also with the Spessart's regional history.

In the outlying centre of Sendelbach is a school museum with the foci '"Imperial Germany" (1871-1918) and "Third Reich" (1933-1945).

Germany's smallest museum is to be found on Haaggasse in a former transformer hut under monument protection, it shows a variety of insulators.

=== Buildings ===
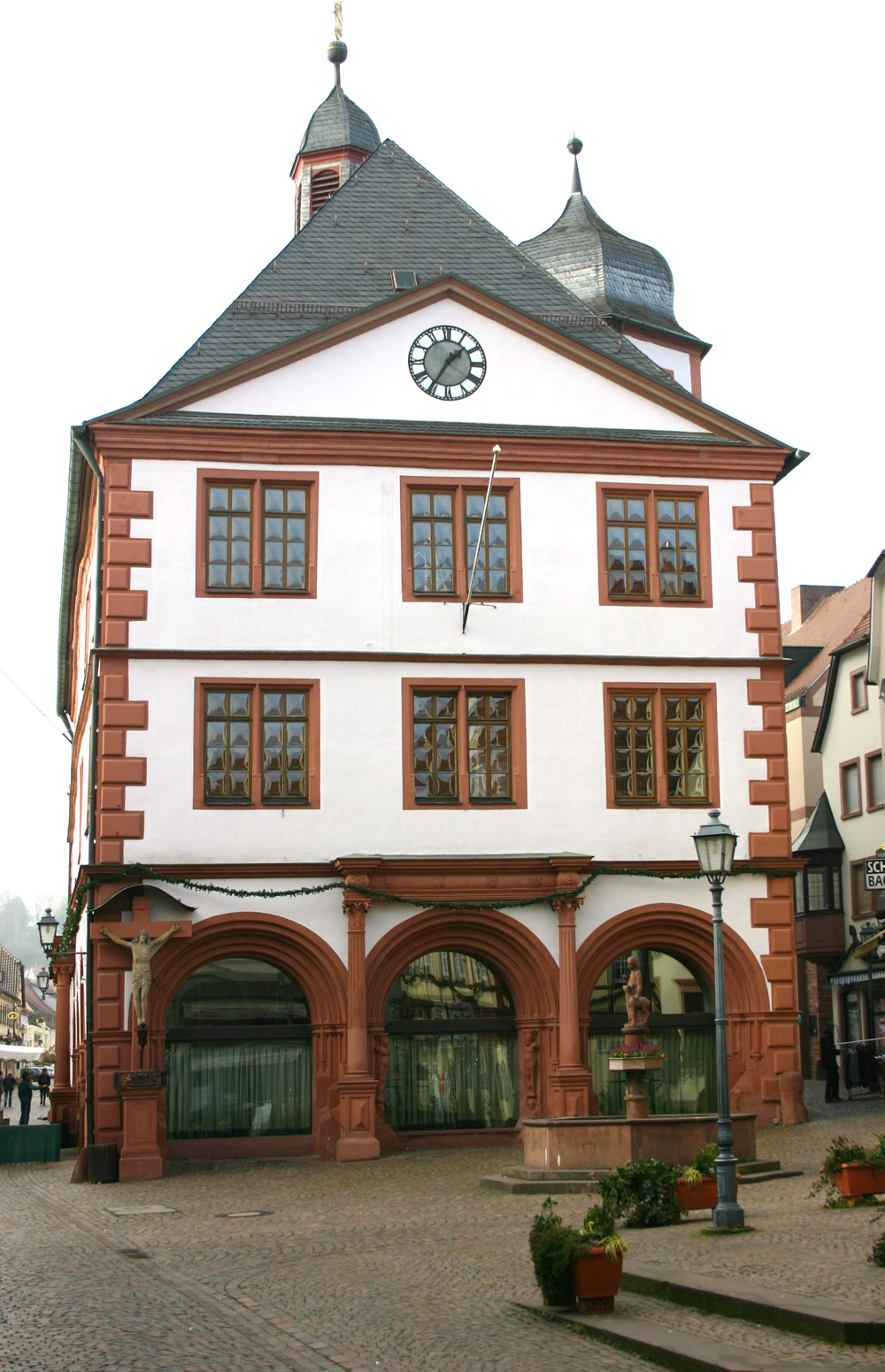
Old town hall

Some of the sights of Lohr are the old town hall (1599-1602), the Lohrer Schloss (an Electoral Mainz palatial castle, 15th to 17th century, that grew from a 14th-century castle of the Rieneck counts), the Roman Catholic parish church St. Michael (12th to 15th century), the Bayersturm (old town watchtower, 1330-1385), remnants of the town's fortifications, the historic Fischerviertel ("fishermen’s quarter") and the old town with many timber-frame buildings. Outside of the town, there is the important pilgrimage site of Mariabuchen Monastery and the Baroque Schloss and church in Steinbach.

The Alte Mainbrücke Lohr ("Lohr old Main bridge"), an arch bridge, has spanned the river Main since 1875. One hundred years later, the 417 m-long Neue Mainbrücke Lohr ("Lohr new Main bridge"), a prestressed-concrete structure was constructed.

=== Events ===
The Lohr Good Friday Procession each year draws thousands of visitors. Thirteen life-sized figures mark the Way of the Cross. The figures are borne and overseen by members of the various craftsmen's guilds. The Procession is actually a remnant of a once much greater, Baroque figure procession. It likely arose in the years after the Thirty Years' War. The earliest confirmed mention in the church records kept by Saint Michael's parish comes from 1656.

Going back to a vow made during the Plague in 1666 is the Lohr custom of holding a procession each year on Saint Roch's Day (16 August) to the Valentinusberg (hill) above the town and holding festive church services there in honour of the Holy Trinity.

Spessartsommer combines an array of summertime events such as Lohrer Tanzfest (dance festival), Altstadtfest (old town festival), City-Festival and Klingendes Lohr (ringing Lohr).

Of particular importance is the Spessartfestwoche ("Spessart festival week"), which lasts ten days around 1 August. A Bavarian beer tent with seating for 4,500 and live music and a beergarden right on the Main with seating for a further 2,000 form the event’s centrepiece. There are also rides and a fireworks finale. In 2008, the 63rd Spessartfestwoche was held. The Festwochen-Express bus service’s 12 special lines to and from the festival saw a ridership of 23,416.

There are also cabaret and amateur theatre events in Lohr and the outlying centres.

== Governance ==
=== Mayor ===
The mayor (Erster Bürgermeister) of Lohr is Mario Paul. He was elected in March 2014. He is the successor of Ernst-Heinrich Prüße (CSU).

=== Coat of arms ===
The town's arms might be described thus: Barry of ten gules and Or a bend wavy azure.

The town's arms are essentially those borne by the Counts of Rieneck, who were the local lords from the 13th century until 1559. The wavy bend most likely refers to the Lohrbach, a local stream. The town’s oldest known seal, from 1408, already shows this design. Over time, the number of bars in the escutcheon has varied, as has the tincture of the bend (a version published in the 1920s, for instance, showed “Barry of nine gules and Or a bend wavy vert” – with nine bars and a green bend), for there was no proper blazon for the arms until 1957, when they were officially conferred on the town.

=== Town twinning ===
Lohr am Main is twinned with:

- Ouistreham, Calvados, France
- Burgeis, South Tyrol, Italy
- Milicz, Lower Silesia, Poland

=== Sponsorship ===
- Přísečnice, Czech Republic

In 1956 the town undertook the sponsorship arrangement for Sudeten Germans driven out of their homeland in the town and district known in German as Preßnitz. The town itself no longer exists. In 1974, its former site became the bed of a new reservoir.

== Infrastructure ==
=== Transport ===
==== Rail ====
The Main-Spessart Railway (Main-Spessart-Bahn) from Würzburg and Gemünden leaves the Main valley on the way to Aschaffenburg–Frankfurt am Main and crosses through the Spessart.

The Lohr–Wertheim line from Lohr station through the town was a single-track, unelectrified, standard-gauge line to Wertheim. Passenger transport between Lohr-Town station and Wertheim was discontinued on 30 May 1976. Passenger service between Lohr-Bahnhof and Lohr-Town ended on 22 May 1977, although this part of the line is still in use for occasional goods transports. The former Lohr-Town station was converted to a pub.

A direct early InterCity service to Munich was replaced with a Regionalbahn to Würzburg when the Nuremberg–Munich high-speed railway came into service in 2006. The nearest InterCityExpress stops are Aschaffenburg and Würzburg.

On the eastern edge of town runs a short stretch of the Mühlbergtunnel on the Hanover-Würzburg high-speed rail line running north-south. Also within town limits runs a part of the Nantenbach Curve with the Schönraintunnel.

==== Road ====
Lohr lies on Bundesstraße 26, Bundesstraße 276, Staatsstraße (State Road) 2435 and Staatsstraße 2315. The nearest Autobahnen are the A 3 (Munich - Würzburg – Frankfurt) through the Weibersbrunn, Hösbach and Marktheidenfeld interchanges, and the A 7 (Würzburg - Kassel) through the Hammelburg interchange.

==== Waterway ====
The river Main is a "Federal Waterway" (Bundeswasserstraße) of the first order, administered by the Wasser- und Schifffahrtsamt Schweinfurt.

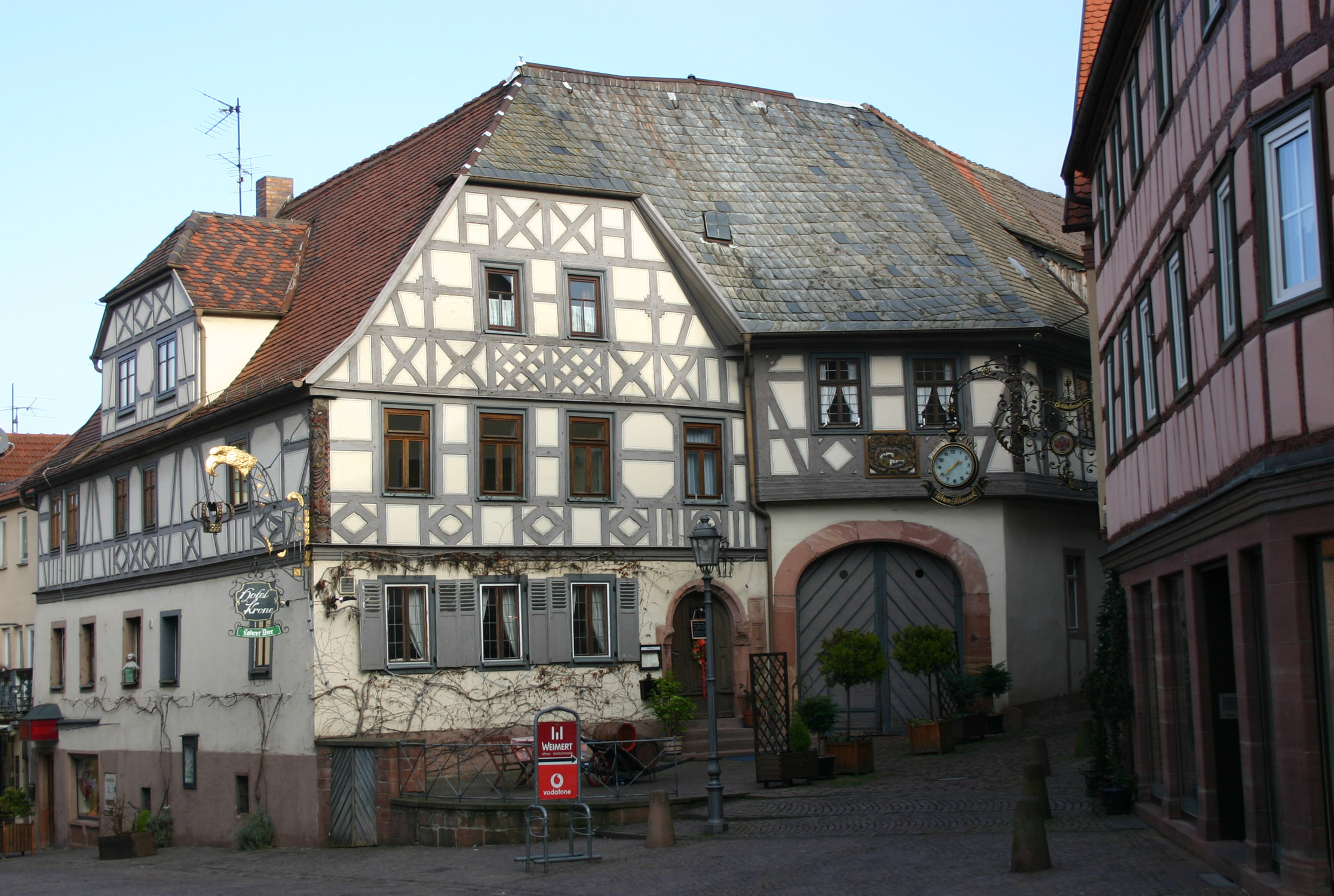
Gasthaus Krone (inn) from 1589

=== Healthcare ===
Lohr has at its disposal a Kreiskrankenhaus (District Hospital) with the disciplines of surgery, internal medicine, anaesthesiology, neurology, gynaecology, urology, ophthalmology and otolaryngology, and also the Bezirkskrankenhaus (Regional Hospital) for psychiatry, psychotherapy, psychosomatic medicine and forensic medicine for the Regierungsbezirk of Lower Franconia (Unterfranken).

== Education ==
- Primary schools: Lohr am Main, Rodenbach, Sackenbach, Sendelbach, Wombach
- Special education schools: St. Kilian-Schule Sonderpädagogisches Förderzentrum Marktheidenfeld – Lohr; St. Nikolaus-Schule with emphasis on mental development
- Hauptschule: Gustav-Woehrnitz-Volksschule Lohr am Main
- Realschule: Georg-Ludwig-Rexroth-Realschule
- Gymnasium: Franz-Ludwig-von-Erthal-Gymnasium
- Vocational school: Staatliche Berufsschule Main-Spessart with professional school and training centre
- Professional school - Berufsfachschule für Krankenpflege (nursing)
- Forest school: Bayerische Forstschule
- Forest management school: Bayerische Technikerschule für Waldwirtschaft
- IGM education centre
- Music school: municipal singing and music school
- Folk high school: Volkshochschule der Stadt Lohr am Main

== Notable people ==
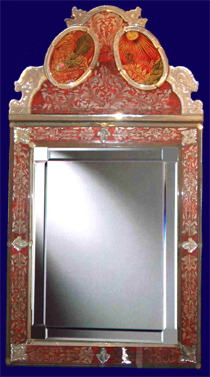
"Snow White's mirror" at the Schloss

- Hans Blum (between 1520 and 1527-around or after 1552), architectural theorist
- Philipp Valentin Voit von Rieneck (1612-1672), Prince Bishop of the Hochstift Bamberg
- Franz Christoph von Hutten (1706–1770), Bishop of Speyer (born in Steinbach)
- Franz Ludwig von Erthal (1730–1795), Bishop of Bamberg and Würzburg
- Franz Anton Brendel (4 October 1735 – 23 May 1799 in Strasbourg), constitutional (not authorized by the Church) Bishop of Strasbourg during the French Revolution
- Franz Jakob Kreuter (1813–1899), German architect and building engineer.
- Joseph Koeth (1870–1936), politician and Reichsminister in the Weimar Republic
- Ignatius Taschner (1871-1913), artist between Jugendstil and Neoclassicism
- Alfred Rexroth (1899-1978), Engineer, Entrepreneur, and Anthroposophist
- Karlheinz Bartels (1937-2016), pharmacist and pharmaceutical historian
- Katrine von Hutten (1944–2013), writer and translator
- Hermann Joha (1960– ), stuntman, owner and managing director of the Action film production company Alarm für Cobra 11
- Nadine Angerer (1978– ), football world champion 2007, European Champion 2009 and 2013
- Nicolai Müller (1987-), football player

== Other ==
- Lohr is one of the places that claim to be Snow White’s birthplace.
