= Neustadt am Main =

- Municipality
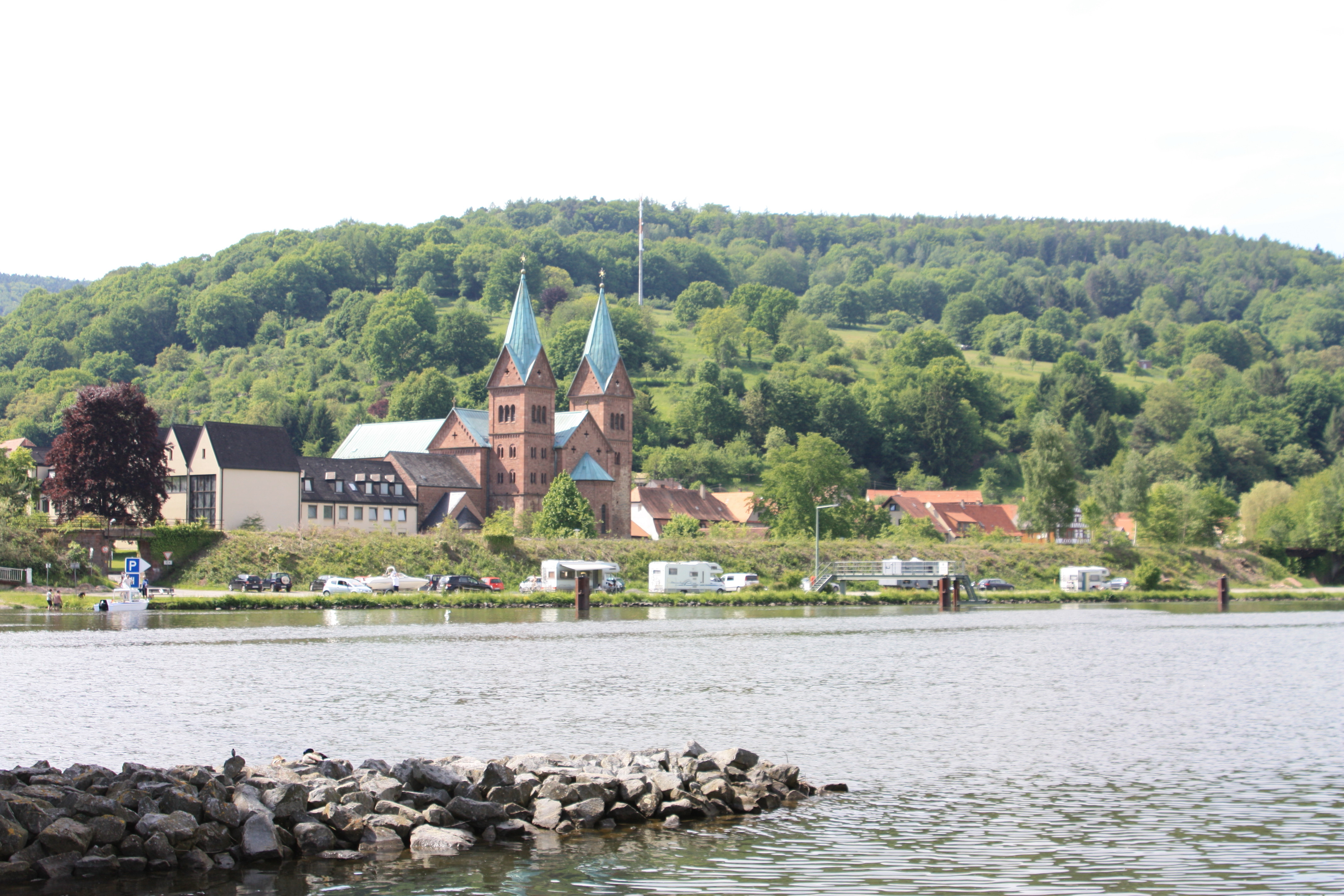
- Neustadt with parish church

- Coat of arms

- Location of Neustadt am Main within Main-Spessart district
- Interactive map of Neustadt am Main
- Location within Germany Location within Bavaria
- Coordinates: 49°55′51″N 9°34′3″E
- Country: Germany
- State: Bavaria
- Admin. region: Unterfranken
- District: Main-Spessart
- Municipal assoc.: Lohr am Main

Government
  - Mayor (2020–26): Stephan Morgenroth

Area
  - Total: 19.81 km^{2} (7.65 sq mi)
- Elevation: 150 m (490 ft)

Population (2025-12-31)
  - Total: 1,140
  - Density: 57.5/km^{2} (149/sq mi)
- Time zone: UTC+01:00 (CET)
  - Summer (DST): UTC+02:00 (CEST)
- Postal codes: 97845
- Dialling codes: 09393
- Vehicle registration: MSP
- Website: www.neustadt-erlach.de

Neustadt am Main (German pronunciation: [ˈnɔʏʃtat ʔam ˈmaɪn], lit. 'Neustadt on the Main'; officially: Neustadt a. Main) is a municipality in the Main-Spessart district in the Regierungsbezirk of Lower Franconia (Unterfranken) in Bavaria, Germany and a member of the Verwaltungsgemeinschaft Lohr am Main (municipal administrative association).

== Geography ==
=== Location ===
Neustadt am Main lies on both banks of the Main river in the Würzburg Region, around 8 km south of the town of Lohr at the foot of the Spessart hills. It is part of the Main-Spessart district in the Regierungsbezirk of Lower Franconia.

The municipal territory stretches quite far into the wooded hills to the west. The highest peak of the Main-Spessart-Kreis is located in Neustadt's territory: the Klosterkuppel at 552 m above sea level. In that area lies the source of the Silberlochbach that flows into the Main near the town.

Out of a total municipal area of around 1,980 hectares, forest accounts for almost 1,600 ha.

=== Subdivisions ===
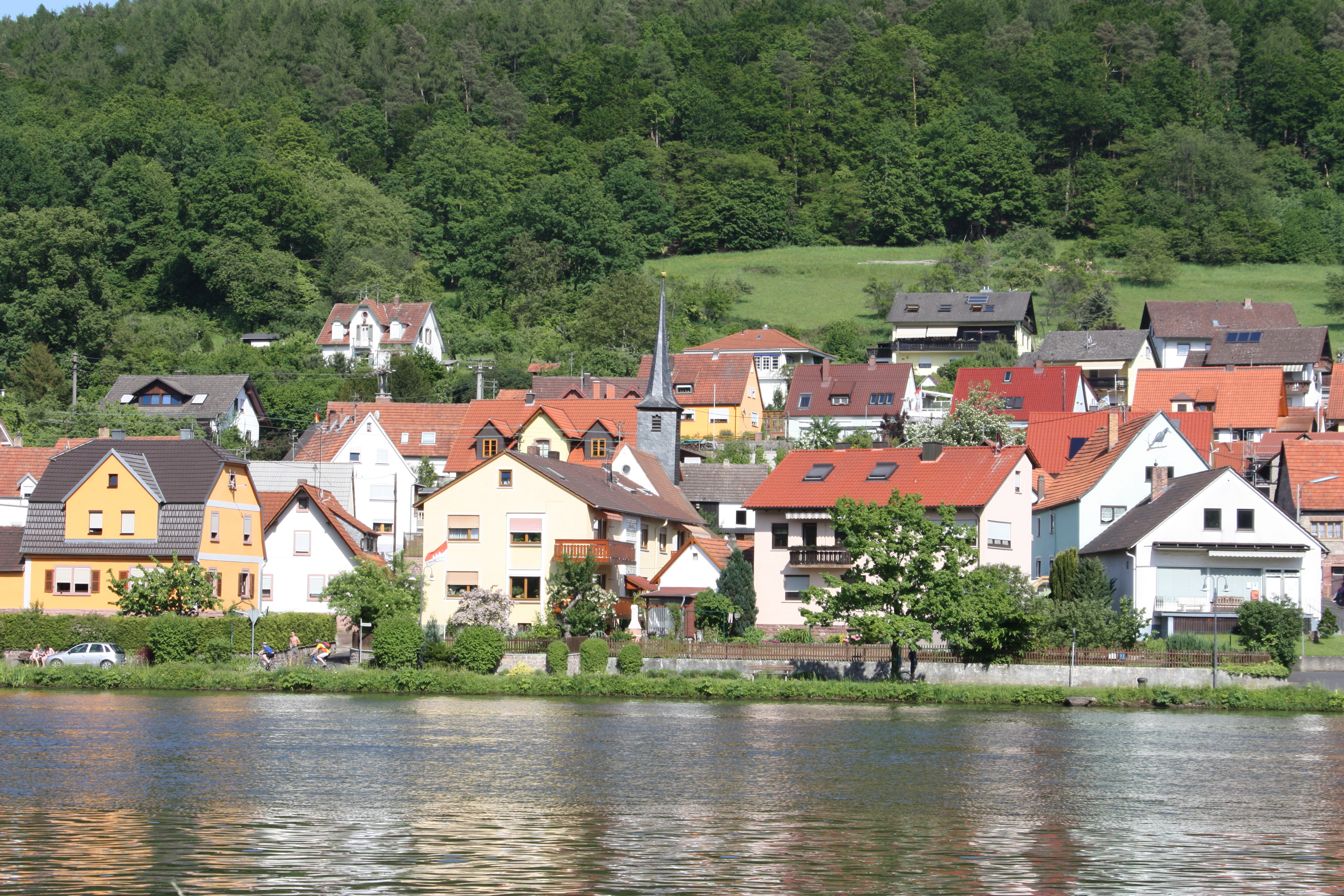
Erlach

The community has the following Gemarkungen (traditional rural cadastral areas): Erlach am Main (on the left bank of the river), Neustadt am Main (on the right bank). The two Ortsteile are linked by a pedestrian bridge across the Main (built 1970-71).

There are two additional (small) settlements, Aurora and Margarethenhof, both located in the wooded hills west of the Main.

=== Neighbouring communities ===
From the north, clockwise:

- Lohr am Main
- Steinfeld
- Roden
- Marktheidenfeld
- Rothenfels
- Fürstlich Löwensteinscher Park (Gemeindefreies Gebiet)
- Forst Lohrerstraße (Gemeindefreies Gebiet)

== History ==
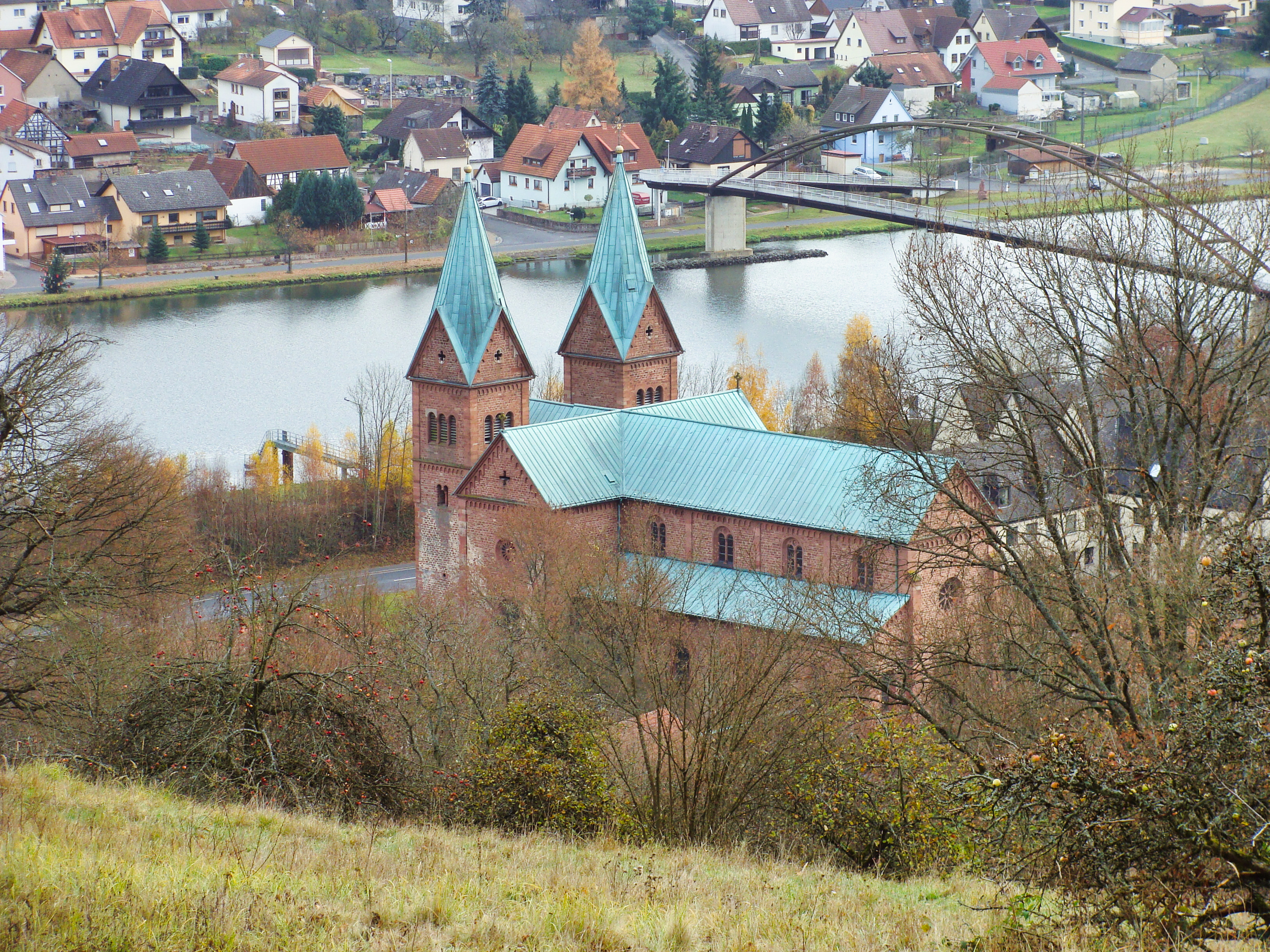
Parish church with pedestrian bridge over the Main

Kloster Neustadt, a Benedictine monastery was first mentioned (Niwenstat) in a document in 768/769, when Megingoz, Bishop of Würzburg, retired from his post to found a monastery on the Michaelsberg. The monastery was one of the most important in Franconia and monks from Neustadt played a key role in bringing Christianity to the Saxons. The town itself was first mentioned in 889 (Niunstadt).

In the late 10th century, the monastery came under the influence of the Prince-Bishop of Würzburg. The monastery was sacked during the Peasants' War in 1525. The church was rededicated in 1534.

The monastery was rebuilt in 1616 under Bishop Julius Echter, but heavily damaged during the Thirty Years' War in 1635-1648. Kloster Neustadt was dissolved in the course of Secularization in 1803. Most of the monastery buildings and the church were destroyed by lightning in 1857.

As part of the Amt of Rothenfels of the Prince-Bishopric (Hochstift) of Würzburg, the community passed with the 1803 Reichsdeputationshauptschluss to the Counts of Löwenstein-Wertheim. After mediatization in 1806 it passed with the Principality of Aschaffenburg in 1814 (by this time the Principality had become a part of the Grand Duchy of Frankfurt) to the Kingdom of Bavaria. In the course of administrative reform in Bavaria, the current community came into being with the Gemeindeedikt ("Municipal Edict") of 1818.

In 1869-1879, the parish church was rebuilt. In 1907, what remained of the monastery was taken over by nuns of the "Dominican Order of Saint Catherine of Siena" from South Africa. By 1960, the monastery had been rebuilt.

In 1978 Karl, Fürst zu Löwenstein, gave the Michaelskapelle to the municipality. It was renovated in 1981-1989.

== Demographics ==
Within town limits, 1,204 inhabitants were counted in 1970, 1,301 in 1987 and in 2000 1,343.

For year-end 2014, the population statistics show 1,331 inhabitants (of which 97 have a secondary residence here).

== Economy ==
According to official statistics, there were 39 workers on the social welfare contribution rolls (Sozialversicherungspflichtig Beschäftigte) working in producing businesses in 1998. In trade and transport there were 22. In other areas, 39 workers on the social welfare contribution rolls were employed, and 474 such workers worked from home. There were 4 processing businesses. One business was in construction, and furthermore, in 1999, there was one agricultural operation.

== Attractions ==
The parish church, St. Michael und Gertrud, contains several pieces of art from the monastery's past, including grave stones (12th and 15th centuries), a Romanesque baptismal font, paintings and frescos. North of the parish church are the remains of the oldest chapel of St. Peter and St. Paul, dating to Abbot Dietho (786/87).

On the Michaelsberg, southwest of the monastery, stands the Michaelskapelle or St. Michaelskirche (formerly the parish church, when the Benedictine monastery was still in operation, until 1803). According to tradition, the ramparts on which it was built date to Charlemagne's hunting lodge, known as Rohrinlach. Excavations have found structures that support the existence of a Carolingian fortification, or possibly a Pfalz. Only the foundation of the current chapel is early Romanesque (11th century), the rest of the structure dates to 1729-33.

The monastery, Neustadt and Erlach feature some other protected monuments and buildings (see List of Neustadt monuments (German). Notable among these are the outlying Margarethenhof (a 12th-century farmyard with a chapel, built and run by the monastery) and the Forsthaus Aurora, a forester's lodge originally constructed in the time under the Counts of Löwenstein (the current lodge dates from 1936).

== Government ==
Since 2014 Stephan Morgenroth (Bürgerliste) has been the Erster Bürgermeister (mayor).

Municipal taxes in 1999 amounted to €587,000 (converted), of which net business taxes amounted to €78,000.

Since 1 May 1978, Neustadt has been a member of the Verwaltungsgemeinschaft Lohr am Main (municipal administrative association). Also at that point, Neustadt and Erlach were merged in the course of Gebietsreform.

=== Town twinning ===
Neustadt is a member of the working group Neustadt in Europa, in which 36 towns (as at September 2008) named Neustadt in Germany, Austria, Hungary, the Czech Republic, Poland and Slovakia have linked together. The following places belong to the group:

- Bad Neustadt an der Saale, Rhön-Grabfeld, Bavaria, Germany
- Bergneustadt, Oberbergischer Kreis, North Rhine-Westphalia, Germany

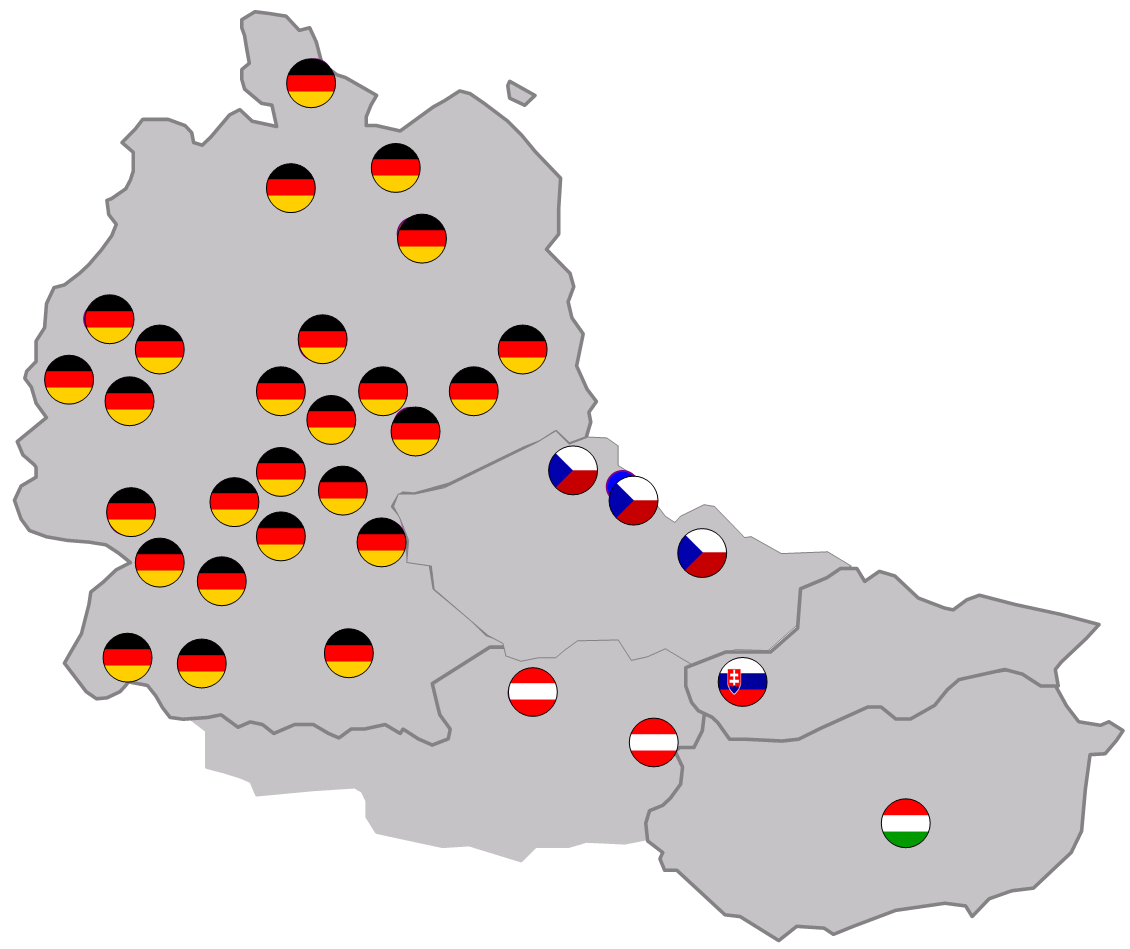
Neustadt in Europa working group, 2006

- Breuberg-Neustadt, Odenwaldkreis, Hesse, Germany
- Dunaújváros, Fejér County, Hungary
- Neuenstadt am Kocher, Heilbronn, Baden-Württemberg, Germany
- Neustadt an der Dosse, Ostprignitz-Ruppin, Brandenburg, Germany
- Neustadt, Marburg-Biedenkopf, Hesse, Germany
- Neustadt an der Wied, Neuwied, Rhineland-Palatinate, Germany
- Neustadt/Harz, Nordhausen, Thuringia, Germany
- Neustadt, Vogtlandkreis, Saxony, Germany
- Neustadt, Westerwaldkreis, Rhineland-Palatinate, Germany
- Neustadt am Kulm, Neustadt, Bavaria, Germany
- Neustadt am Main, Main-Spessart, Bavaria, Germany
- Neustadt am Rennsteig, Ilm-Kreis, Thuringia, Germany
- Neustadt am Rübenberge, Hanover, Lower Saxony, Germany
- Neustadt an der Aisch, Neustadt (Aisch)-Bad Windsheim, Bavaria, Germany
- Neustadt an der Donau, Kelheim, Bavaria, Germany
- Neustadtl an der Donau, Amstetten, Lower Austria, Austria
- Neustadt an der Orla, Saale-Orla-Kreis, Thuringia, Germany
- Neustadt (Spree), Bautzen, Saxony, Germany
- Neustadt an der Waldnaab, Neustadt, Bavaria, Germany
- Neustadt an der Weinstraße, Rhineland-Palatinate, Germany
- Neustadt bei Coburg, Coburg, Bavaria, Germany
- Neustadt an der Rems, Rems-Murr-Kreis, Baden-Württemberg, Germany
- Neustadt in Holstein, Ostholstein, Schleswig-Holstein, Germany
- Neustadt in Sachsen, Sächsische Schweiz-Osterzgebirge, Saxony, Germany
- Neustadt, Eichsfeld, Thuringia, Germany
- Neustadt-Glewe, Ludwigslust-Parchim, Mecklenburg-Vorpommern, Germany
- Nové Město na Moravě, Vysočina Region, Czech Republic
- Nové Město nad Metují, Hradec Králové Region, Czech Republic
- Nové Mesto nad Váhom, Trenčín Region, Slovakia
- Nové Město pod Smrkem, Liberec Region, Czech Republic
- Nowe Miasto Lubawskie, Nowe Miasto County, Warmian-Masurian Voivodeship, Poland
- Nowe Miasto nad Pilicą, Grójec County, Masovian Voivodeship, Poland
- Titisee-Neustadt, Breisgau-Hochschwarzwald, Baden-Württemberg, Germany
- Wiener Neustadt, Lower Austria, Austria

=== Coat of arms ===
The community's arms might be described thus: Per pale argent a lowercase uncial N upon which a small cross pattée sable, gules a sword proper waved in pale, point downwards.

The uncial N with the cross on top is the sign that the old Neustadt Monastery, founded about 770 by Bishop of Würzburg Megingoz, used to mark its estate. In 993 the monastery passed to the Princely Electorate (Hochstift) of Würzburg, remaining with that state until Secularization in 1803. Recalling this former allegiance are the tinctures argent and gules (silver and red), those borne by the Electorate. The waved sword was taken from a village court seal from the early 18th century that showed Saint Michael with a sword. The arms have been borne since 1968.

== Infrastructure ==
=== Transport ===
Neustadt used to have a station on the discontinued Lohr–Wertheim line. The road Staatsstrasse 2315 passes through the village.

== Education ==
In 1999, Neustadt had a kindergarten with 50 places used by 42 children.
