= County of Rieneck =

European polity

Bailiwick of the Archbishopric of Mainz; Lordship (County) of Rieneck Vogtei des Mainzer Erzstift; Herrschaft (Grafschaft) Rieneck
- before 1100–1559; 1673–1806
- Coat of arms
- Status: State of the Holy Roman Empire
- Capital: Lohr
- Government: County
- Historical era: Middle Ages
  - First mention of Rieneck: c. 790
  - County established: before 1100
  - Court of Louis I, Count of Loon: from 1168
  - Granted city rights by Emperor Louis IV: 1333
  - Comital line extinct: 1559
  - Purchased by Count of Nostitz: 1673
  - Mediatised to Aschaffenburg: 1806
  - Granted to Bavaria: 1815
| Preceded by | Succeeded by |
| Electorate of Mainz | Principality of Aschaffenburg |

The County of Rieneck was a comital domain within the Holy Roman Empire that lay in what is now northwestern Bavaria (in the west of Lower Franconia). It bore the same name as its original ruling family, the Counts of Rieneck, from whom the county and its main seat, the town of Rieneck, got their names.

== History ==
The first documentary evidence of what is now the town of Rieneck surfaces in AD 790. Rieneck gained its name from the Counts of Rieneck, who founded the line of Burgraves of Gerhart at the end of the 11th century from the Vogtei over the Archbishopric of Mainz between Neustadt am Main, Lohr am Main and Karlstadt am Main. The family line died out with Gerhard I, Count of Rieneck in 1108. His only daughter married Arnold, Count of Loon (1101–39), inheriting Rienecker territory and, around 1156/7 by Louis I, Count of Loon, the family name, possibly as a result of an unsuccessful claim to the Rhineland castle Burg Rhieneck. As soon as the name was acquired, his family built the castle on the banks of the river Sinn. With the 1168 expansion of the castle, Louis I chose Burg Rieneck as his court.

From 1295, Lohr am Main became the seat of the burgraviate and border posts were set up to shelter the local castle from the domains of the archbishopric. In 1333, the county was granted city rights by Louis IV the Bavarian, Holy Roman Emperor, as thanks for support during his struggle for the kingdom. Skillful dynastic marriages allowed for the gradual expansion of their domain; conflict often resulted between Rieneck and their neighbors, the Archbishopric of Mainz and the Bishopric of Würzburg.

When, in 1333, the male comital line died out, the Bishopric of Würzburg tried to acquire the Lordship. After the 1366 death of Count Johann von Rieneck, the Archbishopric of Mainz claimed feudal sovereignty over the whole county, a claim reaffirmed after the 1408 death of Count Ludwig XI of Riencek.

In 1544, the Protestant Reformation was introduced to county by the Schaffhauser Johann Konrad Ulmer. The comital line died out again with Philip III, Count of Rieneck on 3 September 1559, reigniting the feud over the succession between the sees of Mainz and Würzburg; Lohr became the administrative seat of the Lordship of Rieneck under the Archbishop-Elector of Mainz.

In 1673, the county was purchased by Count Johann Hartwig of Nostitz-Rieneck. In 1803 Counts of Nostitz sold it to the Princes of Colloredo-Mansfeld. The Napoleonic Wars and the dissolution of the Empire led to the county being mediatised to the Principality of Aschaffenburg in 1806. In 1815, the county – then a part of the Grand Duchy of Frankfurt – was granted to the Kingdom of Bavaria by the Congress of Vienna.

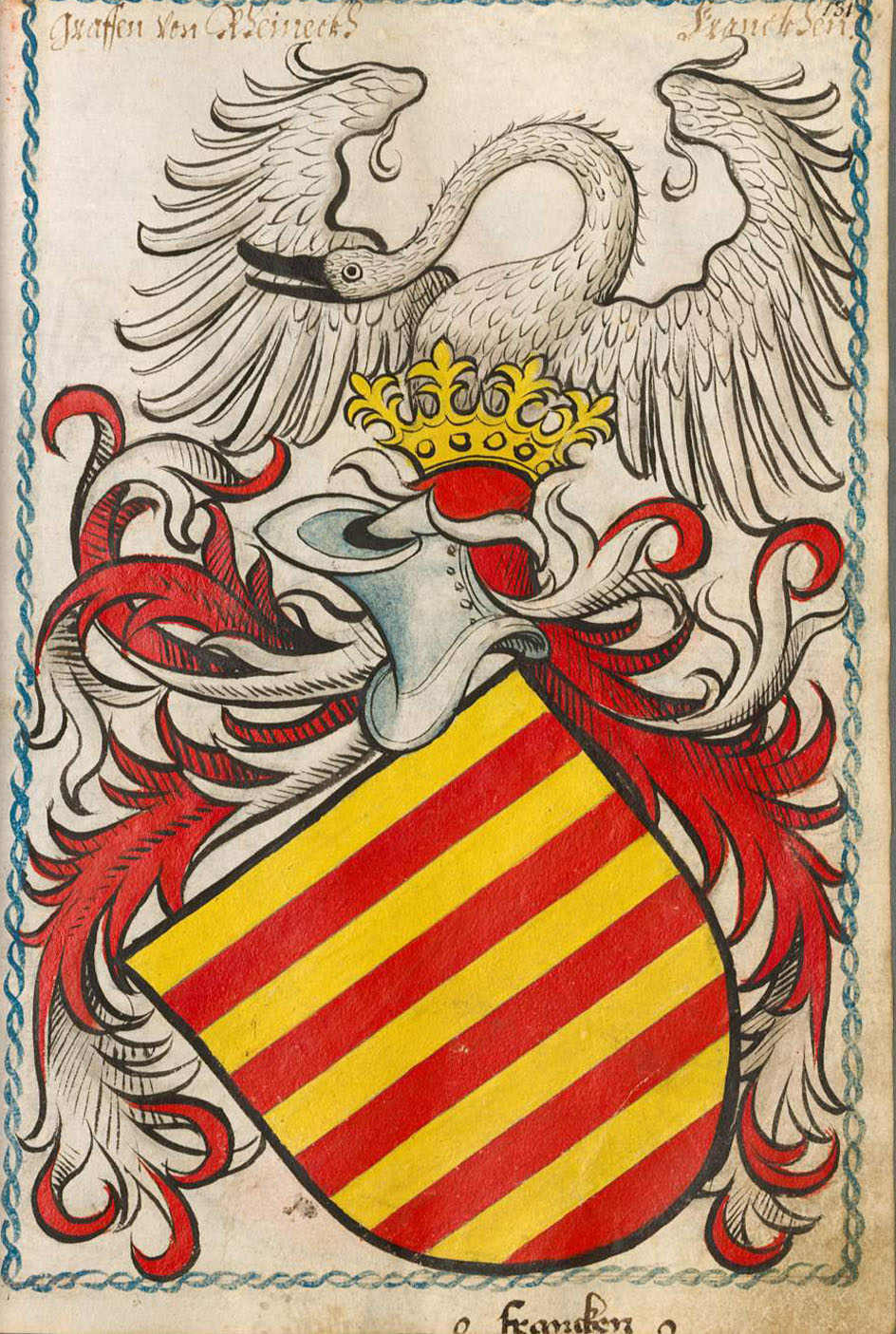
Coat of arms of the Counts of Rieneck, from the Scheiblersches Wappenbuch
