= Schollbrunn =

- Municipality
- Coat of arms

- Location of Schollbrunn within Main-Spessart district
- Interactive map of Schollbrunn
- Location within Germany Location within Bavaria
- Coordinates: 49°50′N 9°28′E
- Country: Germany
- State: Bavaria
- Admin. region: Unterfranken
- District: Main-Spessart
- Municipal assoc.: Kreuzwertheim

Government
  - Mayor (2020–26): Thea Kohlroß

Area
  - Total: 11.23 km^{2} (4.34 sq mi)
- Elevation: 397 m (1,302 ft)

Population (2025-12-31)
  - Total: 861
  - Density: 76.7/km^{2} (199/sq mi)
- Time zone: UTC+01:00 (CET)
  - Summer (DST): UTC+02:00 (CEST)
- Postal codes: 97852
- Dialling codes: 09394
- Vehicle registration: MSP

Schollbrunn is a municipality in the Main-Spessart district in the Regierungsbezirk of Lower Franconia (Unterfranken) in Bavaria, Germany and a member of the Verwaltungsgemeinschaft (Administrative Community) of Kreuzwertheim. It has a population of over 900.

== Geography ==
Schollbrunn lies in the Lower Franconia region, west of Würzburg in the Main-Spessart district. The community has only the Gemarkung (traditional rural cadastral area) of Schollbrunn. The town is surrounded by the wooded hills of the Spessart.

== History ==
Schollbrunn was part of the County of Wertheim, held by the Counts of Löwenstein-Wertheim, which in 1806 was mediatized by the Principality of Aschaffenburg, with which it passed in 1814 (by this time it had become a department of the Grand Duchy of Frankfurt) to the Kingdom of Bavaria.

== Economy ==
Municipal taxes in 1999 amounted to €443,000 (converted), of which net business taxes amounted to €97,000.

According to official statistics, there were 47 workers on the social welfare contribution rolls working in producing businesses in 1998. In trade and transport this was 0. In other areas, 35 workers on the social welfare contribution rolls were employed, and 340 such workers worked from home. There were 6 processing businesses. Two businesses were in construction, and furthermore, in 1999, there were 20 agricultural operations with a working area of 189 ha, of which 121 ha was cropland and 67 ha was meadowland.

== Government ==
Since 1 May 2014, Thea Kohlroß (Bürger für Schollbrunn) has been mayor.

Schollbrunn is a member of the Verwaltungsgemeinschaft Kreuzwertheim, located at Kreuzwertheim.

=== Coat of arms ===
The community’s arms might be described thus: Vert a cross at the honour point Or surmounted in base by an oakleaf argent palewise and between two roses in chief of the last seeded of the second.

The heraldic roses are taken from the arms formerly borne by the Counts of Wertheim. They recall Countess Elisabeth of Wertheim, who in 1314 bought Schollbrunn. The cross and the tincture vert (green) symbolize the monastery, which was dissolved in the Reformation but revived later by the Catholic Count Dieter von Löwenstein-Wertheim-Rosenberg. The oakleaf represents Schollbrunn’s geographical location in the Spessart and refers to the land clearing at the time when the community was first settled about 1200.

The arms have been borne since 1958.

== Attractions ==
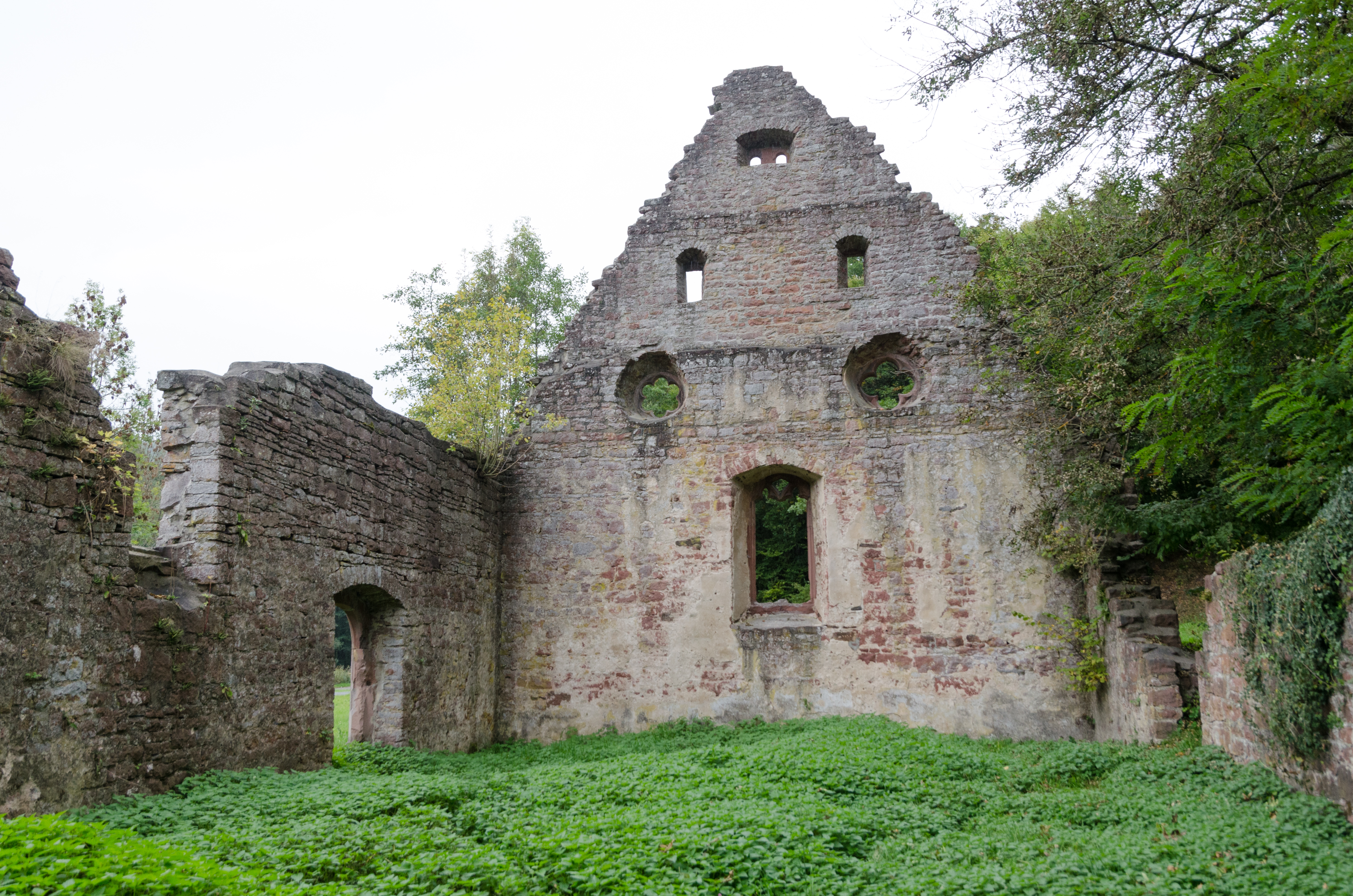
Ruins of the Markuskapelle

- Grünau Charterhouse - a former Carthusian monastery
- Markuskapelle - ruins of a medieval chapel
- In the valley of the Haslochbach there are a number of former water mills

== Infrastructure ==
=== Transport ===
Schollbrunn is located near Autobahn 3, the closest interchange is at Rohrbrunn, connected to Schollbrunn by State Road ST2316, the Spessart Hochstrasse. In the other direction, ST2316 leads to Hasloch on the river Main.

== Education ==
As of December 2008, Schollbrunn had a kindergarten with 33 places used by 21 children.
