= Faulbach (disambiguation) =

Faulbach is a municipality of Lower Franconia in Bavaria, Germany.

Faulbach may also refer to:

- Faulbach (Main), a river of Bavaria, Germany, tributary of the Main
- Faulbach, a locality of the commune Rodemack in the Moselle department in north-eastern France
- Faulbach, a locality of the town Großalmerode in the Werra-Meißner district, Hesse, Germany
- Faulbach, a locality of the town Hadamar in the Limburg-Weilburg district, Hesse, Germany
