= Haslochbach =

River in Germany

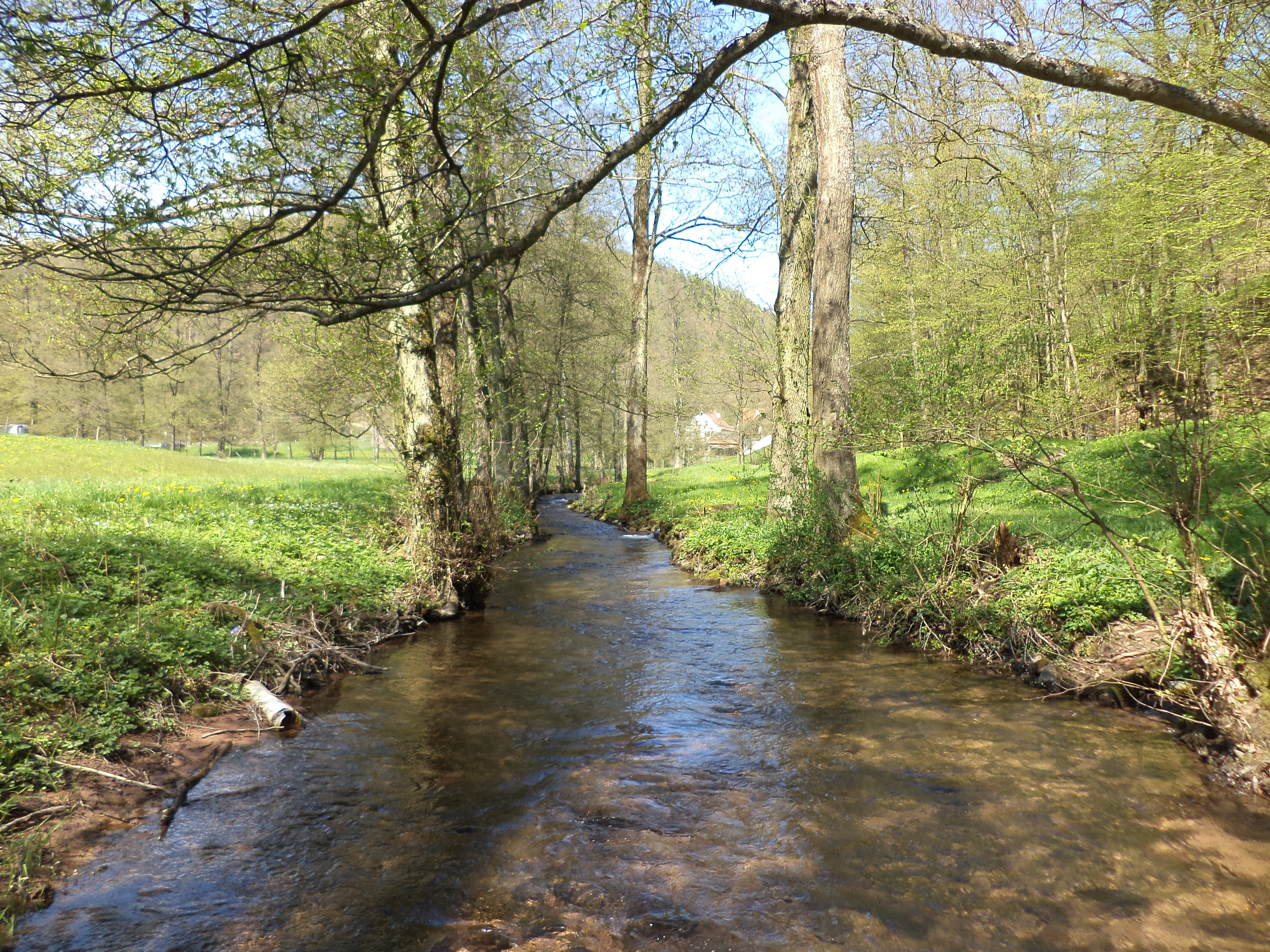
- Haslochbach at the mill Schneidmühle in Schollbrunn

Location
- Country: Germany
- State: Bavaria

Physical characteristics
- Mouth
  - location: Main
  - coordinates: 49.7894°N 9.4965°E
- Length: 14.0 km (8.7 mi)

Basin features
- Progression: Main→ Rhine→ North Sea

Haslochbach is a small river of Bavaria, Germany. It flows into the Main east of Hasloch.

== Course ==
The Hasellochbach rises at the Haselbrunnen in the upper Haseltal, at the foot of the Geiersberg, the highest elevation of the Spessart.

Passing through two small ponds the rivulet then flows to the south and underneath the Haseltalbrücke of the major motorway Bundesautobahn 3. It then becomes the border between the districts of Miltenberg and Main-Spessart and gradually turns more to the southeast.

It flows past the village of Schollbrunn, which is located on the hill to the south. Beginning at the Zwieselsmühle (water mill) the valley of the Haslochbach is called Mühlental and the Schleifbach flows into the Haslochbach from the north. The brook then passes the Nickelsmühle and the Fechermühle (also called Schneidmühle) near the ruin of the medieval Markuskapelle. At the Fechermühle, the Kropfbach or Klosterbach flows into the Haslochbach from the west, from the direction of the nearby Grünau Charterhouse. This marks the end of the Mühlental.

The Haslochbach then flows south past the Barthelsmühle, parallel to the road ST2316, and into the Main, east of Hasloch.

== See also ==
- List of rivers of Bavaria
