= Hasloch =

- Municipality
- Coat of arms

- Location of Hasloch within Main-Spessart district
- Interactive map of Hasloch
- Location within Germany Location within Bavaria
- Coordinates: 49°48′N 9°30′E
- Country: Germany
- State: Bavaria
- Admin. region: Unterfranken
- District: Main-Spessart
- Municipal assoc.: Kreuzwertheim

Government
  - Mayor (2020–26): Wolfgang Haarmann

Area
  - Total: 10.38 km^{2} (4.01 sq mi)
- Elevation: 165 m (541 ft)

Population (2025-12-31)
  - Total: 1,324
  - Density: 127.6/km^{2} (330.4/sq mi)
- Time zone: UTC+01:00 (CET)
  - Summer (DST): UTC+02:00 (CEST)
- Postal codes: 97907
- Dialling codes: 09342
- Vehicle registration: MSP
- Website: www.hasloch.de

Hasloch is a municipality in the Main-Spessart district in the Regierungsbezirk of Lower Franconia (Unterfranken) in Bavaria, Germany and a member of the Verwaltungsgemeinschaft of Kreuzwertheim. Hasloch has a population close to 1,400.

== Geography ==
=== Location ===
Hasloch lies on the river Main in the Würzburg region. The river at this point is the border between Bavaria and Baden-Württemberg. Hasloch is located on the southern edge of the Mittelgebirge Spessart. The Haslochbach flows into the Main east of the village.

=== Subdivisions ===
The community has the following Gemarkungen (traditional rural cadastral areas): Hasloch and Hasselberg.

== History ==
In 1305, Hasloch had its first documentary mention. The former part of the Löwenstein County of Wertheim passed with a small part of the county at mediatization in 1806 to the Principality of Aschaffenburg, with which it passed in 1814 (by this time it had become a department of the Grand Duchy of Frankfurt) to the Kingdom of Bavaria.

In 1974, in the course of municipal reform, the formerly self-administering community of Hasselberg was amalgamated with Hasloch.

== Demographics ==
Within town limits, 1,502 inhabitants were counted in 1970, 1,449 in 1987 and in 2000 1,428.

== Economy ==
Municipal taxes in 1999 amounted to €853,000 (converted), of which net business taxes amounted to €214,000.

According to official statistics, there were 656 workers on the social welfare contribution rolls working in producing businesses in 1998. In trade and transport this was 35. In other areas, 579 such workers worked from home. There was one processing business. No businesses were in construction, and furthermore, in 1999, there were 6 agricultural operations with a working area of 252 ha, of which 198 ha was cropland.

== Government ==
The mayor is Wolfgang Haarmann, elected in March 2020.

=== Coat of arms ===
The community's arms might be described as following: Azure edged Or three hares passant in triskelion of the second, each sharing each ear with one of the others, in chief a rose argent seeded of the second, in base the same. Thus it shows the motif of the "three hares".

== Attractions ==
- Eisenhammer museum: the last water-powered hammer smithy in the Spessart. It dates to 1779 and today still manufactures bell tongues or clappers (see bellfounding).
- Evangelical-Lutheran parish church
- Hexenstein im Wald ("Witch’s Stone in the Forest", towards Faulbach)

== Education ==
In 1999 the following institutions existed in Hasloch:

- Kindergartens: 75 places with 56 children
- primary school with lower grades of Hauptschule
