= Schloss Kreuzwertheim =

Princely palace in Kreuzwertheim, Germany

Coordinates: 49.764°N 9.517°E

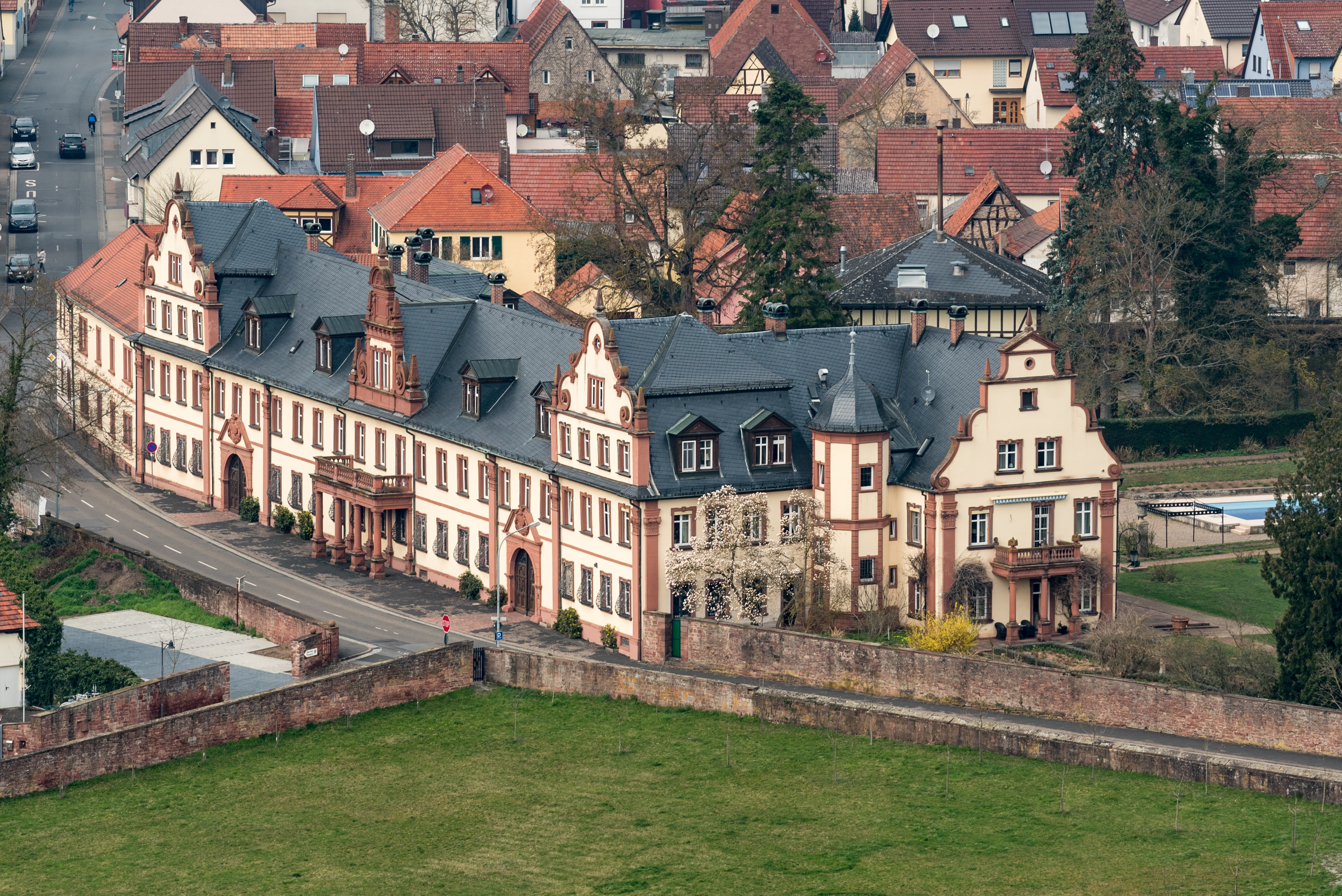
Schloss Kreuzwertheim (2019)

Schloss Kreuzwertheim is a Neo-Renaissance style palace in Kreuzwertheim, a market municipality in the Main-Spessart district of Lower Franconia, Bavaria, Germany, on the right bank of the Main opposite the town of Wertheim. It has served as a residence of the princely family of Löwenstein-Wertheim-Freudenberg since the 18th century and remains in the family's private ownership today.

== History ==
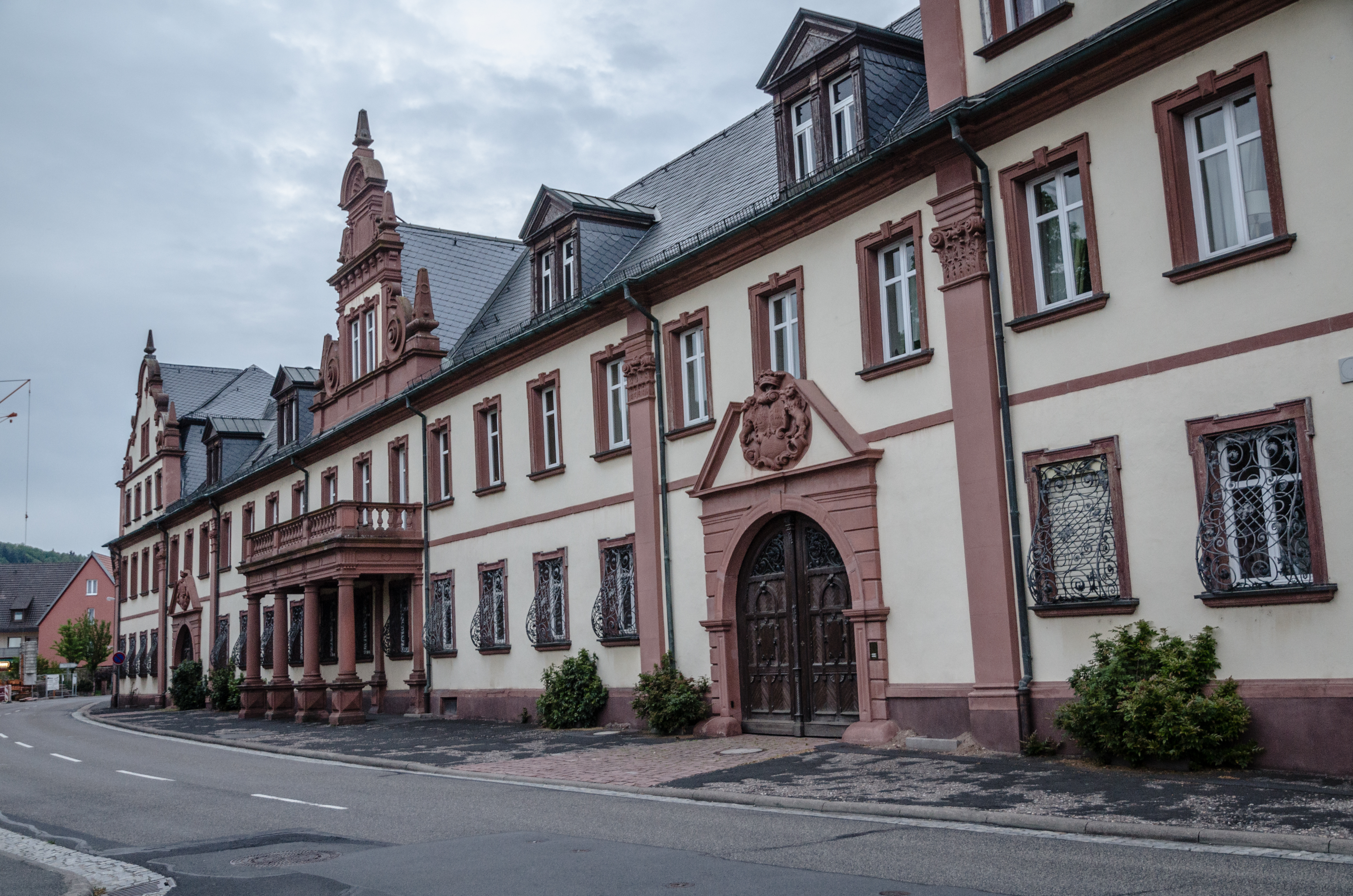
The street facing facade of Schloss Kreuzwertheim (2013)

=== Origins of the site ===
The plot on which the palace stands has a long history predating the current building: a deed dated 16 November 1576 records that the heirs of Count Ludwig von Stolberg-Wertheim granted a hereditary castle fief ('German: Burg- und Erblehen) on the site to the councillor and Amtmann Dr. Johann Coch.

The plot lay within Kreuzwertheim, then part of the county of Wertheim. The Wertheim comital line died out with Count Michael's death in 1556, leaving the county to be ruled jointly, and with difficulty, by his three sons-in-law during the so-called Wertheimer Interregnum. Only Count Ludwig III of Löwenstein, married to the youngest Stolberg daughter, succeeded in establishing sole rule in 1593; from this point the counts, and later princes, styled themselves counts of Löwenstein-Wertheim and relocated their residence to the town of Wertheim.

=== Construction as a dower house (1736–1738) ===
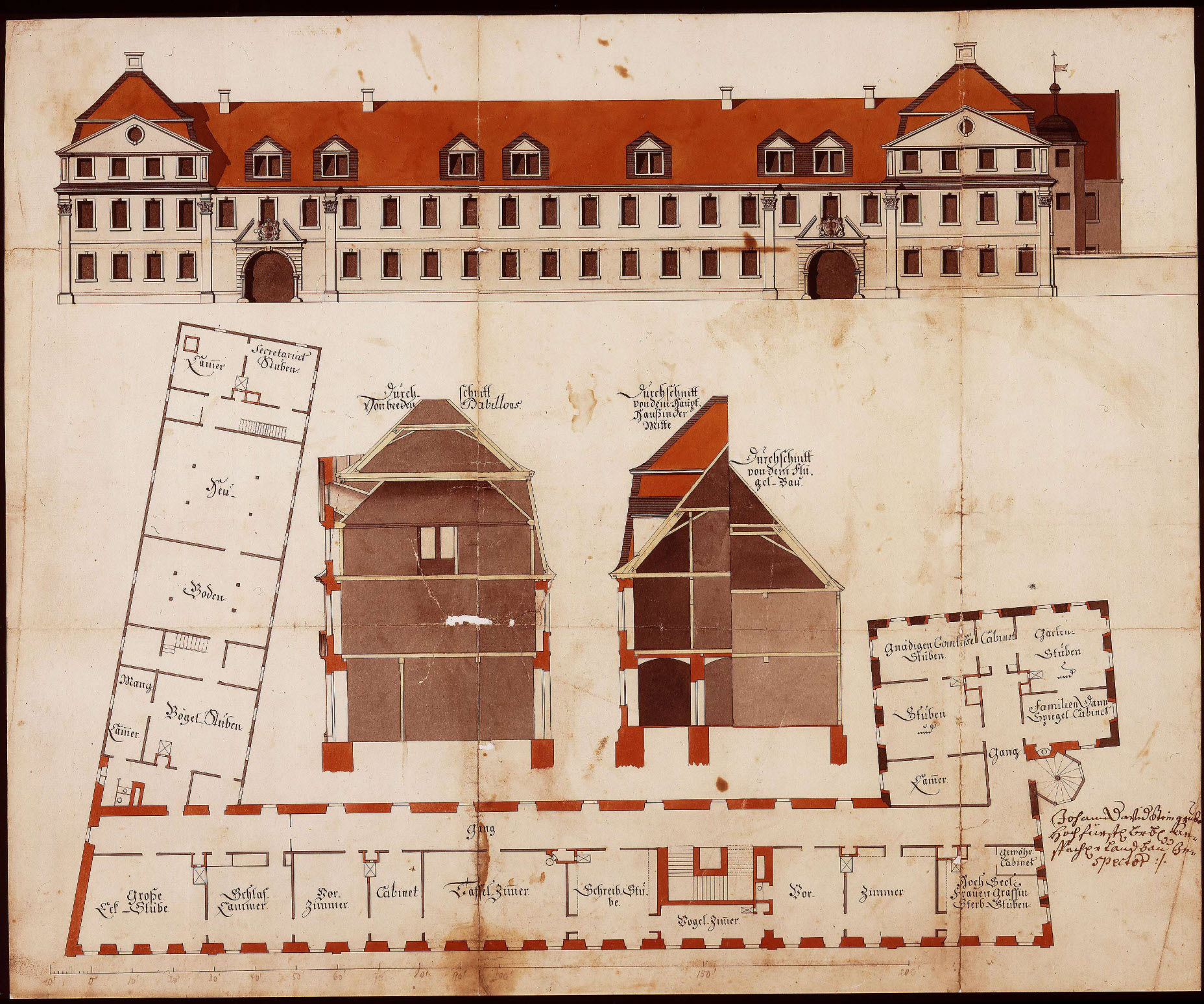
The Wittumshaus (dower house) in Kreuzwertheim (around 1747)

Between 1736 and 1738, the Kreuzwertheim palace was built as a dower house (German: Witwensitz or Wittumshaus) for Countess Amöne Sophia Friederike von Löwenstein-Wertheim-Rochefort und Virneburg, née Countess of Limpurg. She had married Count Heinrich Friedrich von Löwenstein-Wertheim-Virneburg in 1703; following his death in 1721, she commissioned the construction of the building as her own seat. A dated joint coat of arms of 1736 above the main entrance combines her marital Löwenstein-Wertheim-Virneburg arms with her paternal Limpurg arms, and inscriptions above the two ceremonial portals identify her as the builder. The main seat of the Löwenstein-Wertheim-Virneburg family was the Kemenate am Schloßberg in Wertheim, which currently houses the princely chancellery.

As completed, the building was a plain, elongated two-storey Baroque structure with a mansard roof, restrained in ornamentation. Various plans were also drafted for a larger Baroque-style palace in Kreuzwertheim, however, this ambitious project was never realized. These plans originated with the princely Löwenstein-Wertheim-Rosenberg branch of the family, rather than the Freudenberg branch that ultimately built and has occupied the existing palace. Kreuzwertheim lay within the county of Wertheim, which the two branches held jointly as a condominium until the 1806 mediatization. The various plans that were drafted are preserved in the Staatsarchiv Wertheim (Landesarchiv Baden-Württemberg).

==== Non realized designs for a new palace at Kreuzwertheim (Landesarchiv Baden-Württemberg) ====
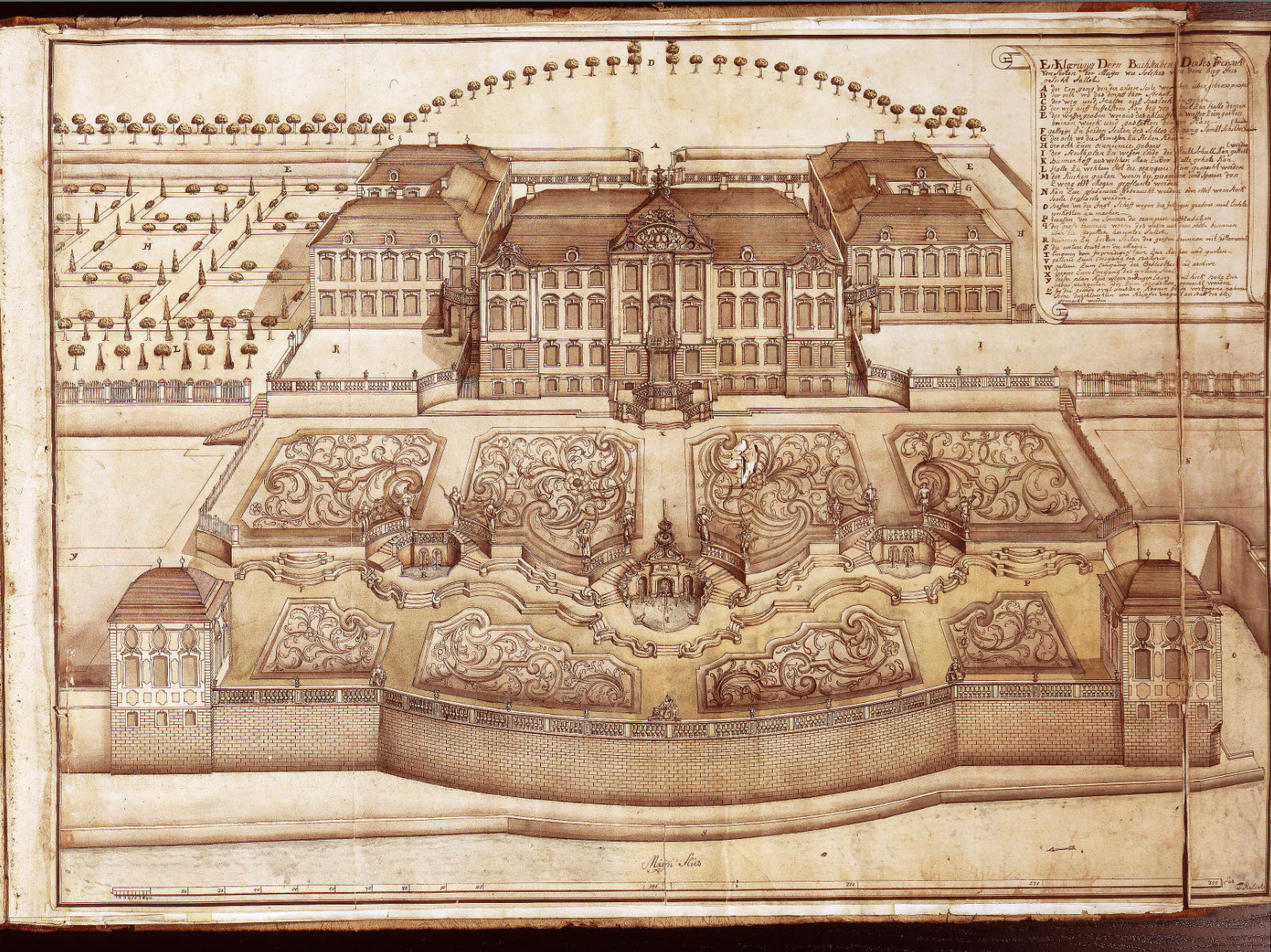

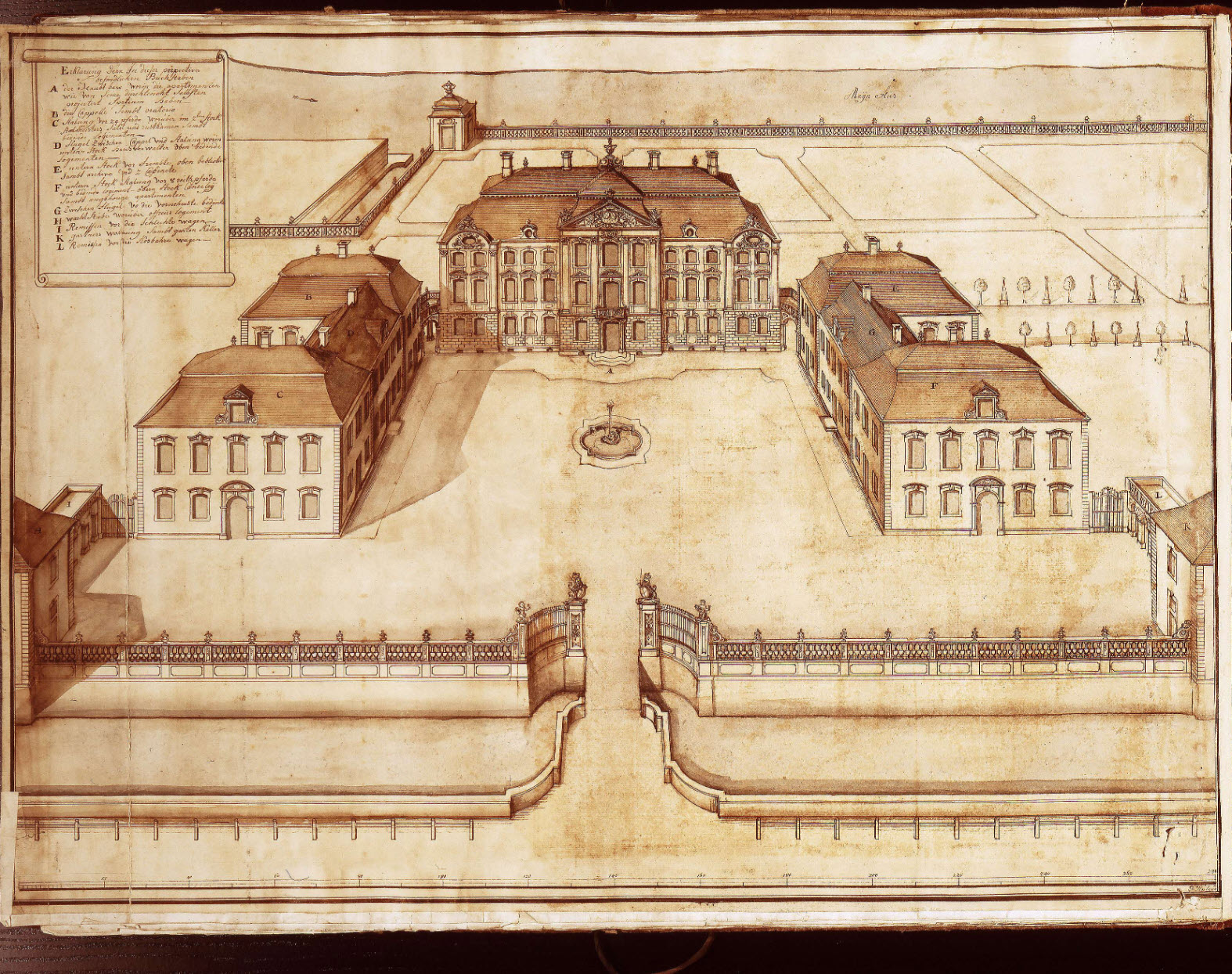

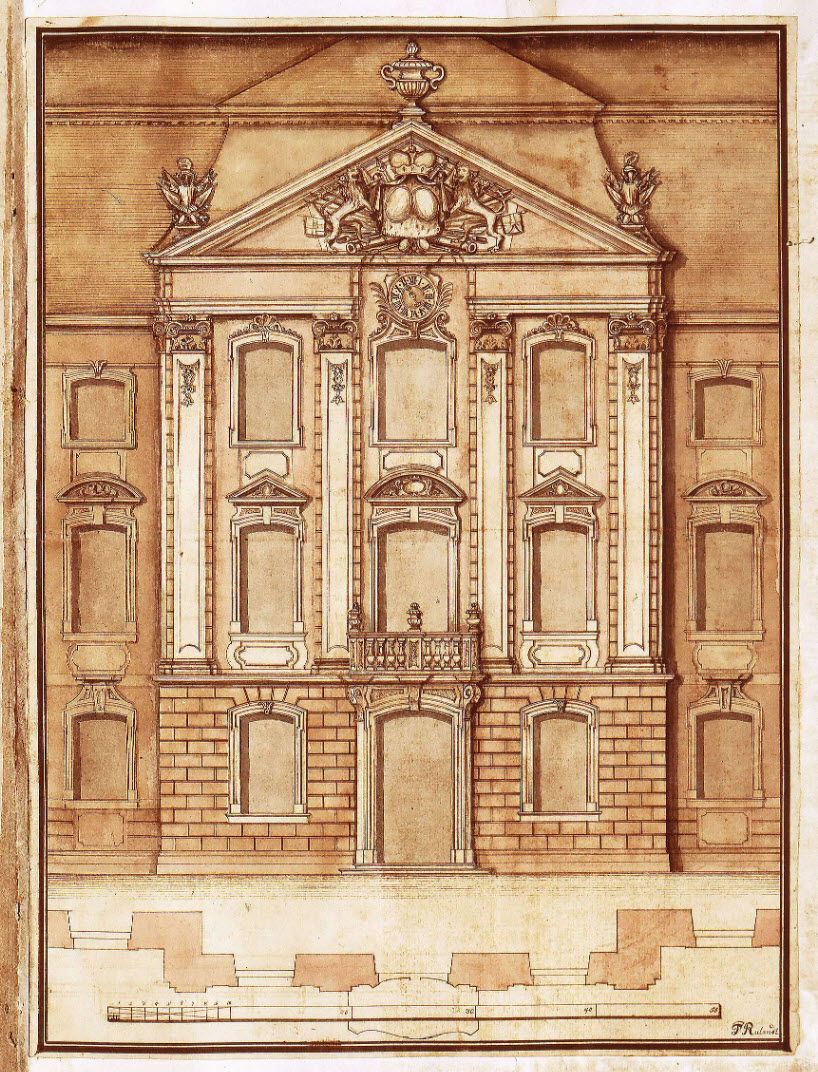

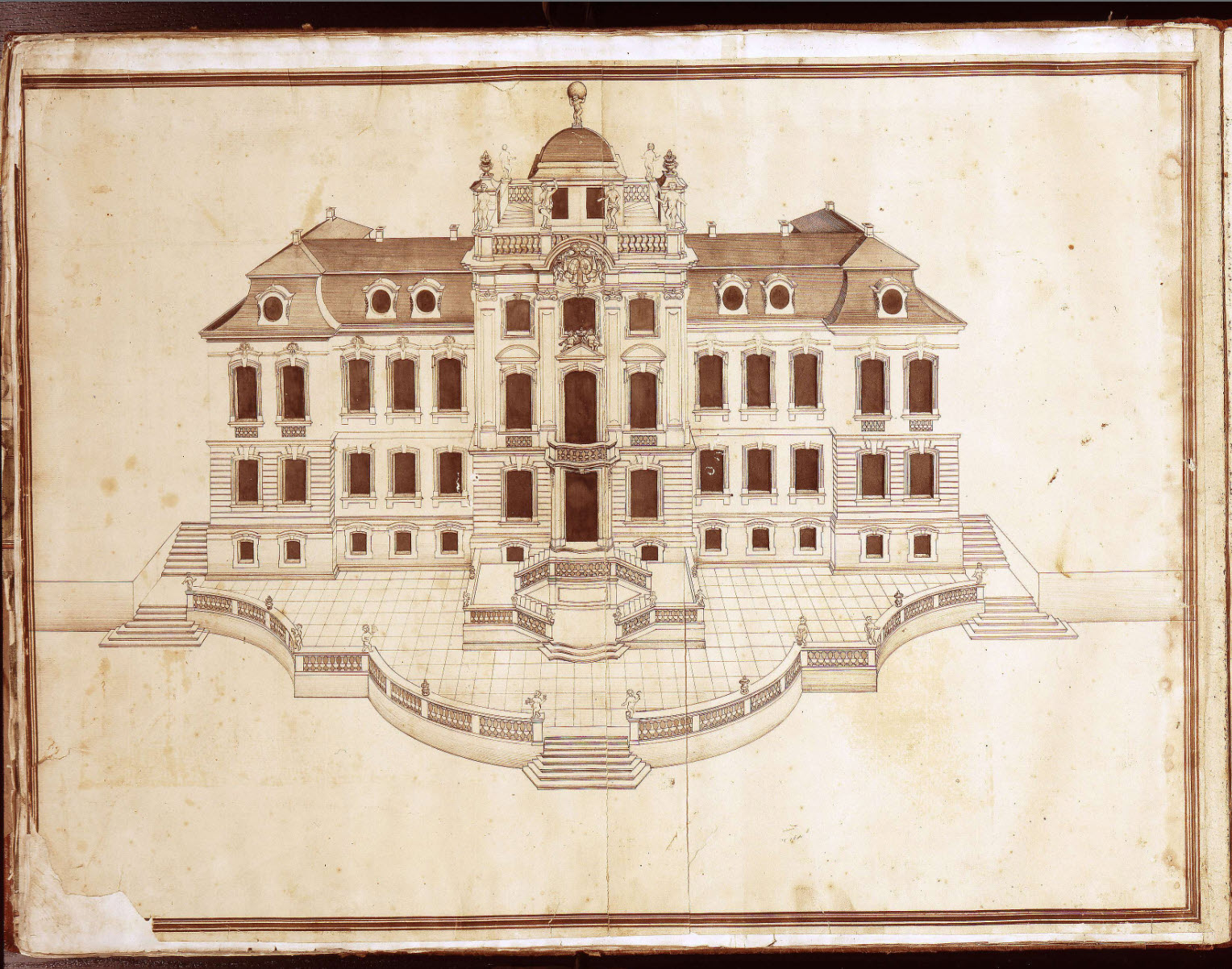

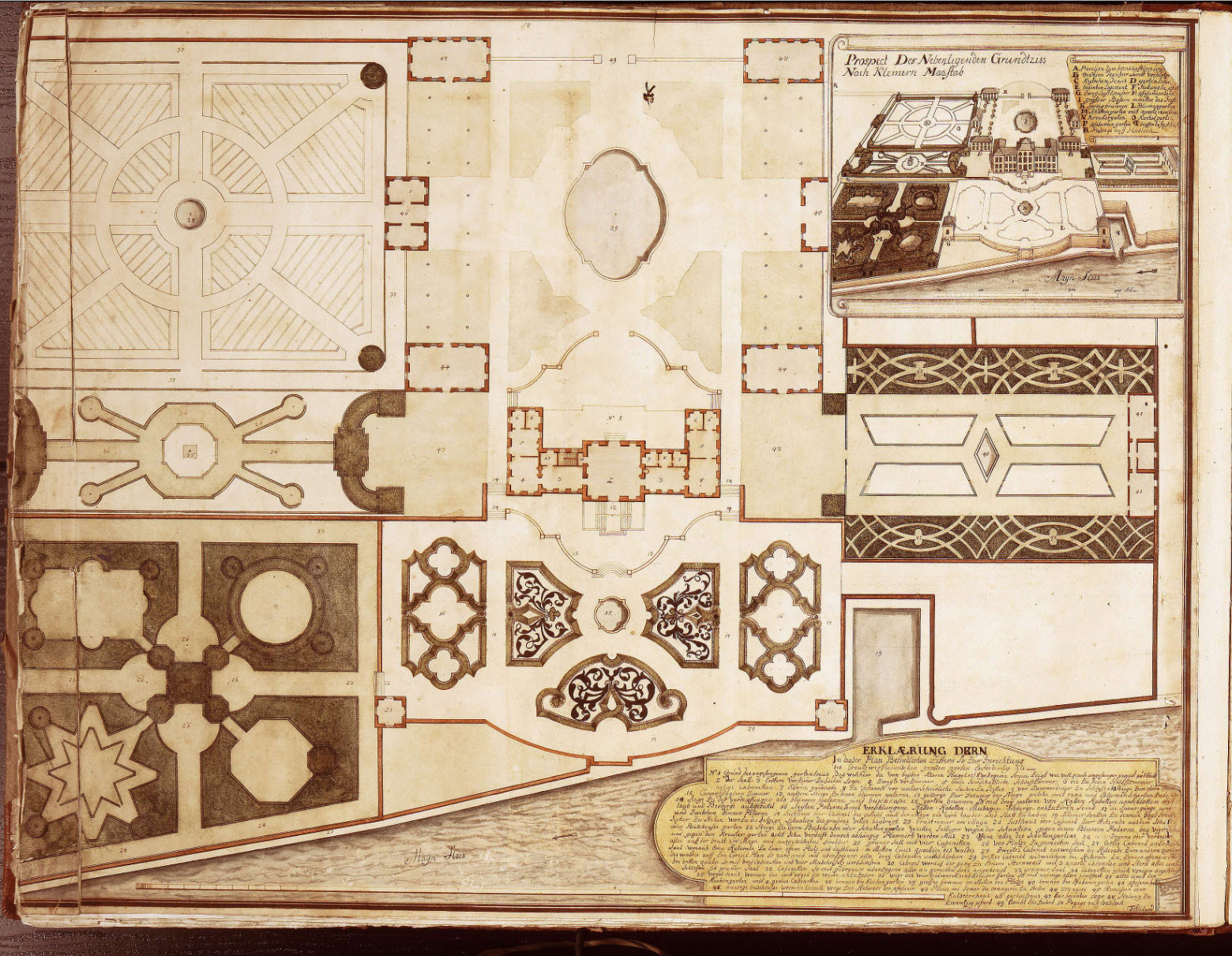

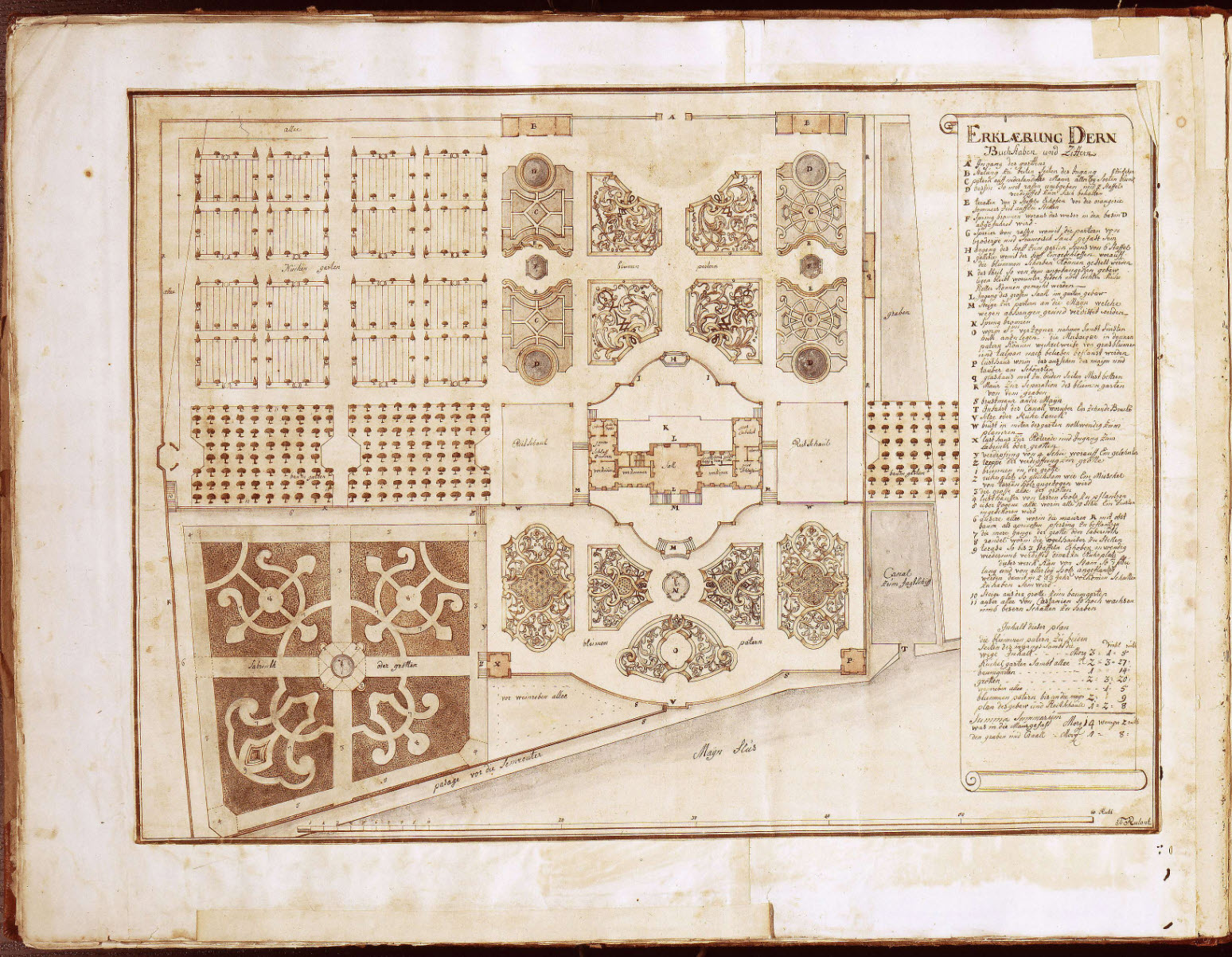

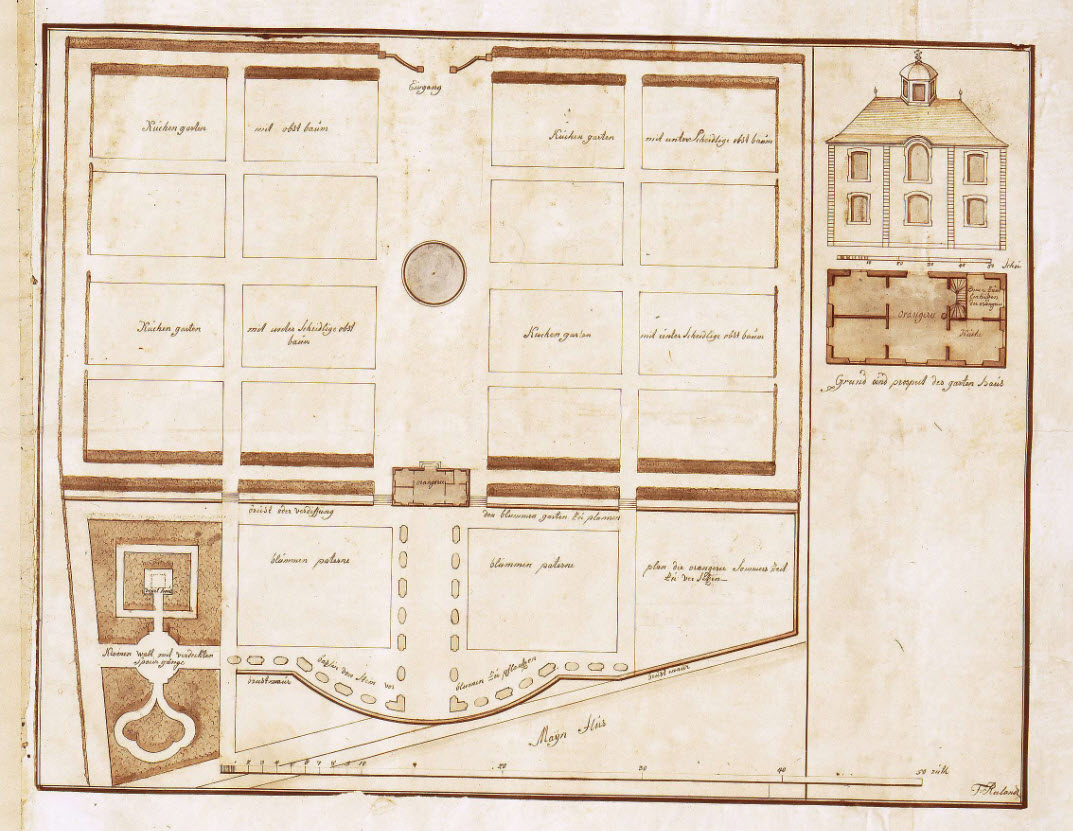

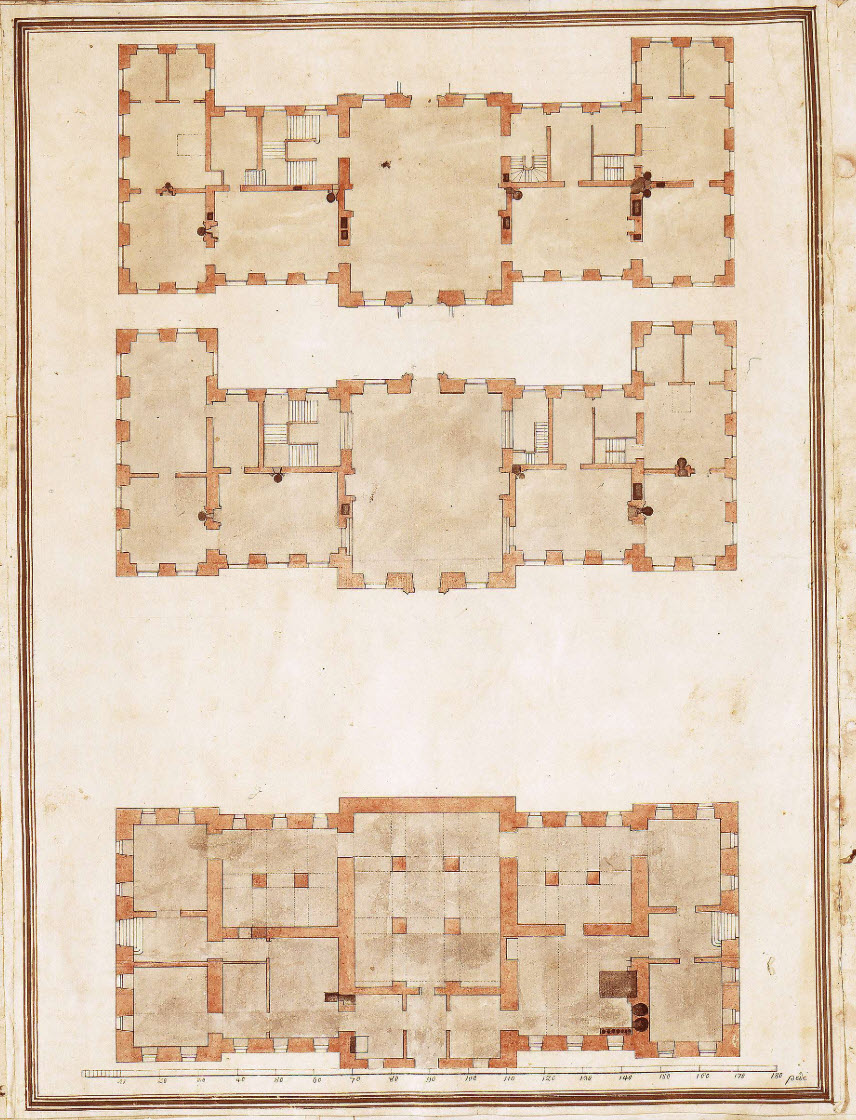

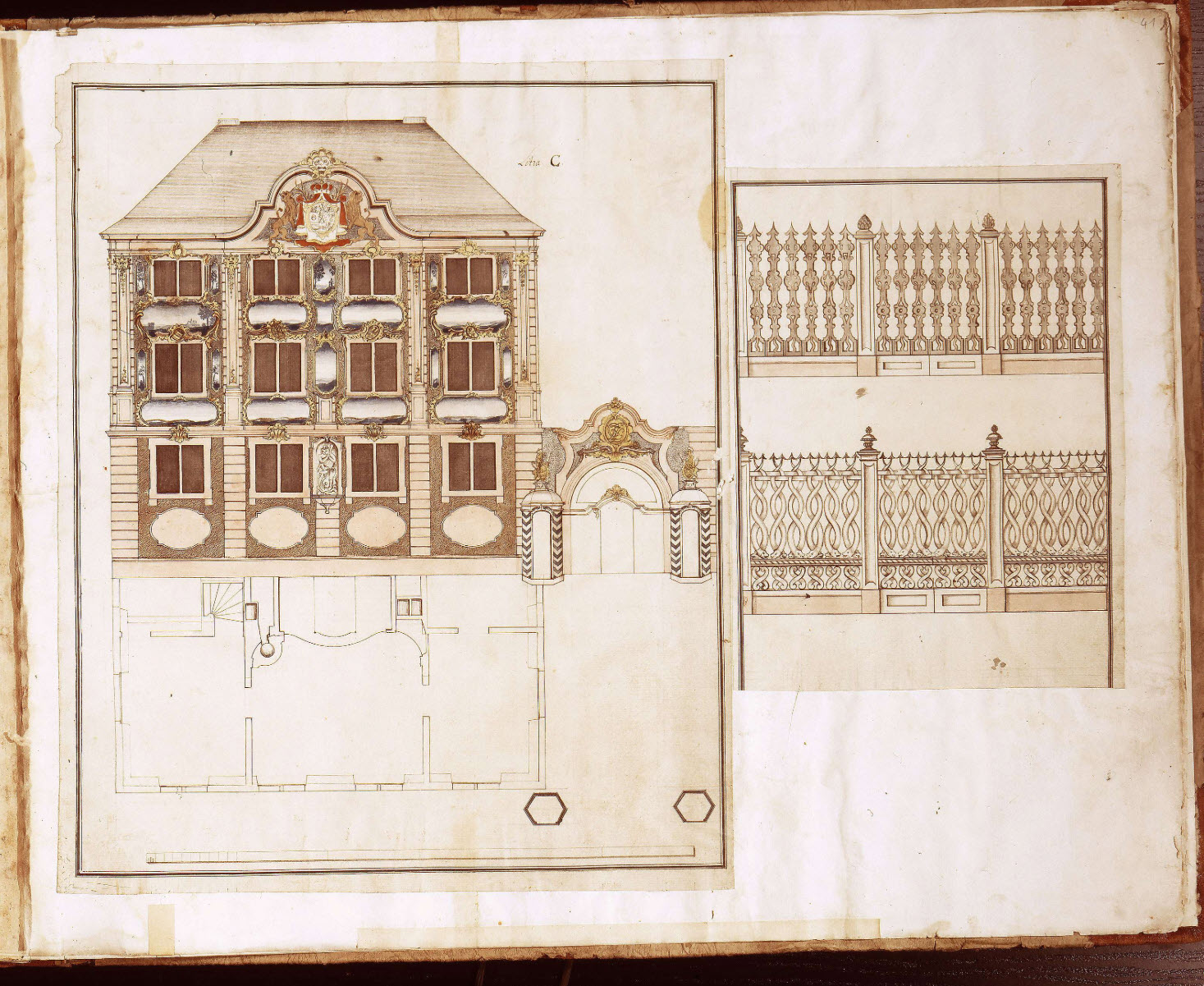

=== The 1806 division of Wertheim and Kreuzwertheim ===
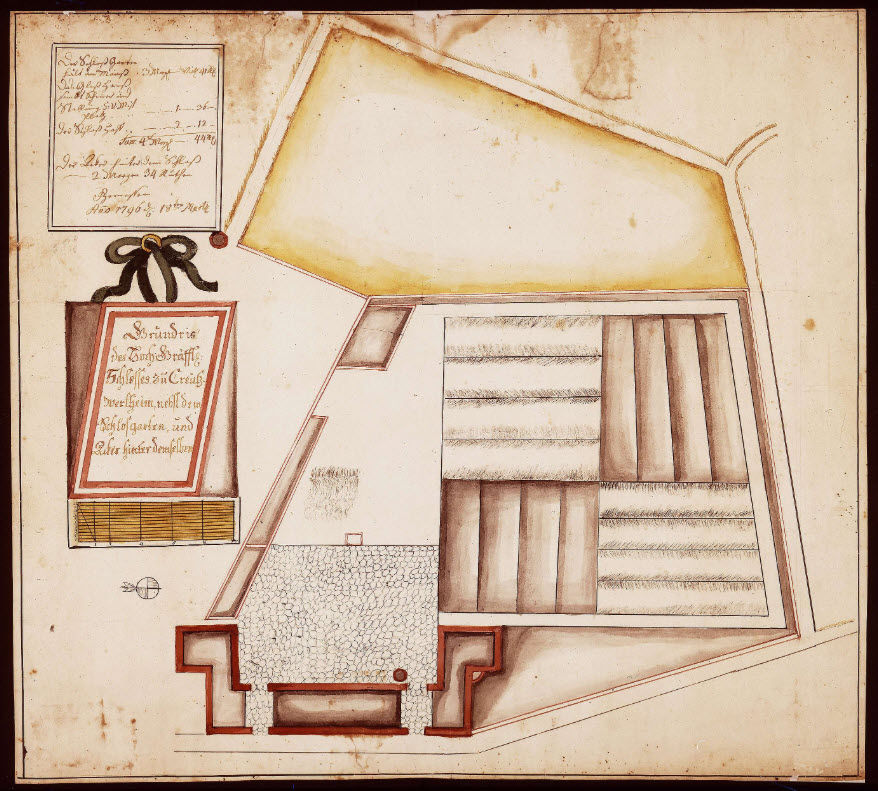
Plan of Schloss Kreuzwertheim (1796)

The settlement that became Kreuzwertheim originally grew out of the same municipal area as the town of Wertheim on the opposite bank. Only the reordering of European territory under Napoleon split the settlement in 1806 into two separate municipalities, present-day Wertheim and Kreuzwertheim, with the Main forming the new border between them. This administrative division shaped the town in which the palace stands and coincided with the broader mediatisation of the county of Löwenstein-Wertheim in the same year.

=== Administrative use following mediatization (1806–1848) ===
After the mediatization of the county of Löwenstein-Wertheim in 1806, the building housed the princely chancellery (Fürstlich Löwensteinsche Kanzlei) until 1848, serving an administrative as well as a residential function.

=== Conversion into the family's primary residence (1890) ===
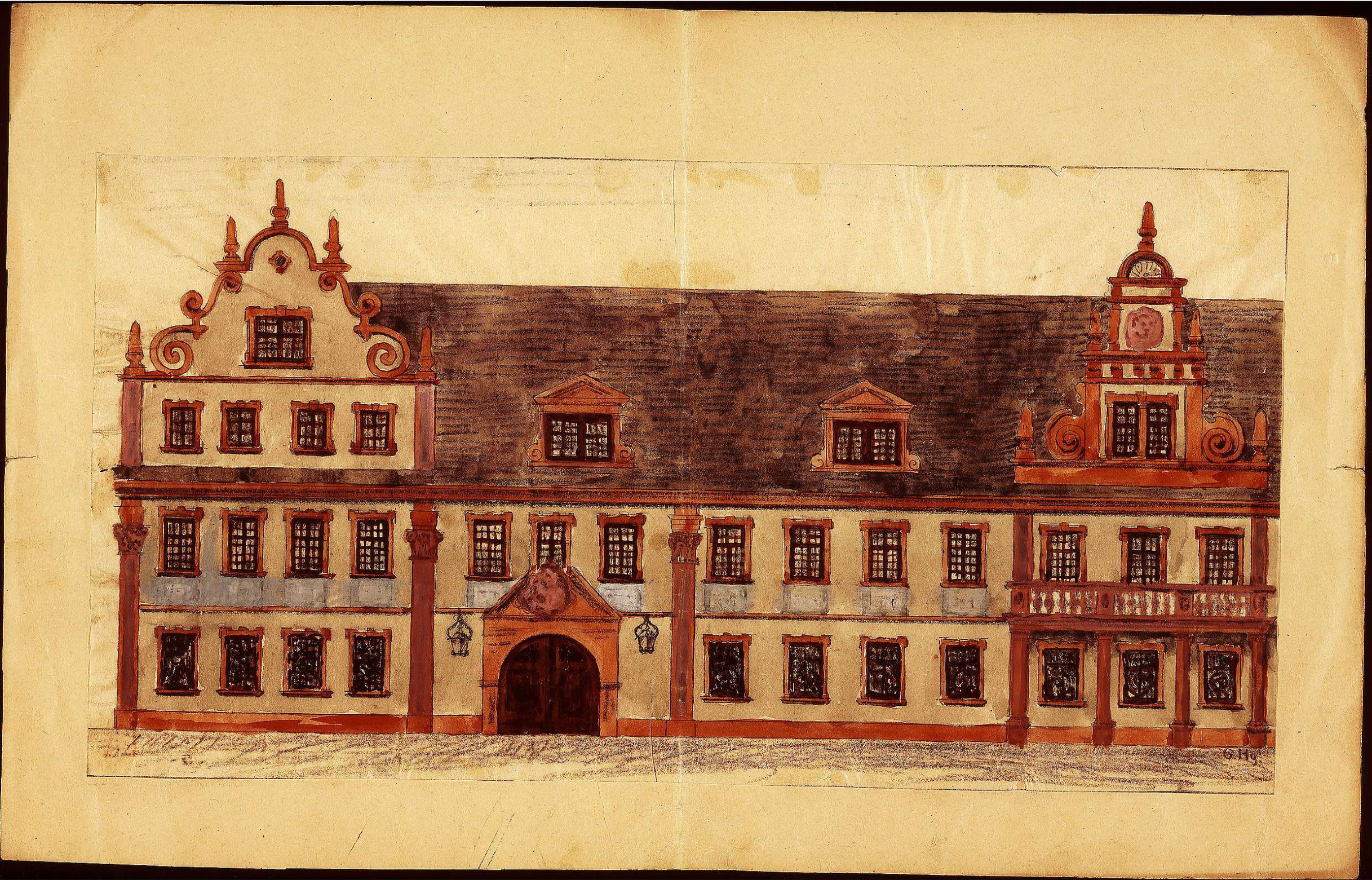
Design for the street facing facade of Schloss Kreuzwertheim (1890s (?))

In 1890, Prince Ernst and Princess Wanda zu Löwenstein-Wertheim-Freudenberg converted the palace into their principal residence. As part of this remodeling, Neo-Renaissance volute gables (German: Blendgiebel) were added to the originally austere Baroque façade. On the street-facing side, a central balcony supported by four columns was added, and a new staircase was built on the garden side.

The surrounding park, combining English and French landscape styles with a grotto, fountains, and a bathing pavilion, was also laid out in 1890.

=== Present day ===
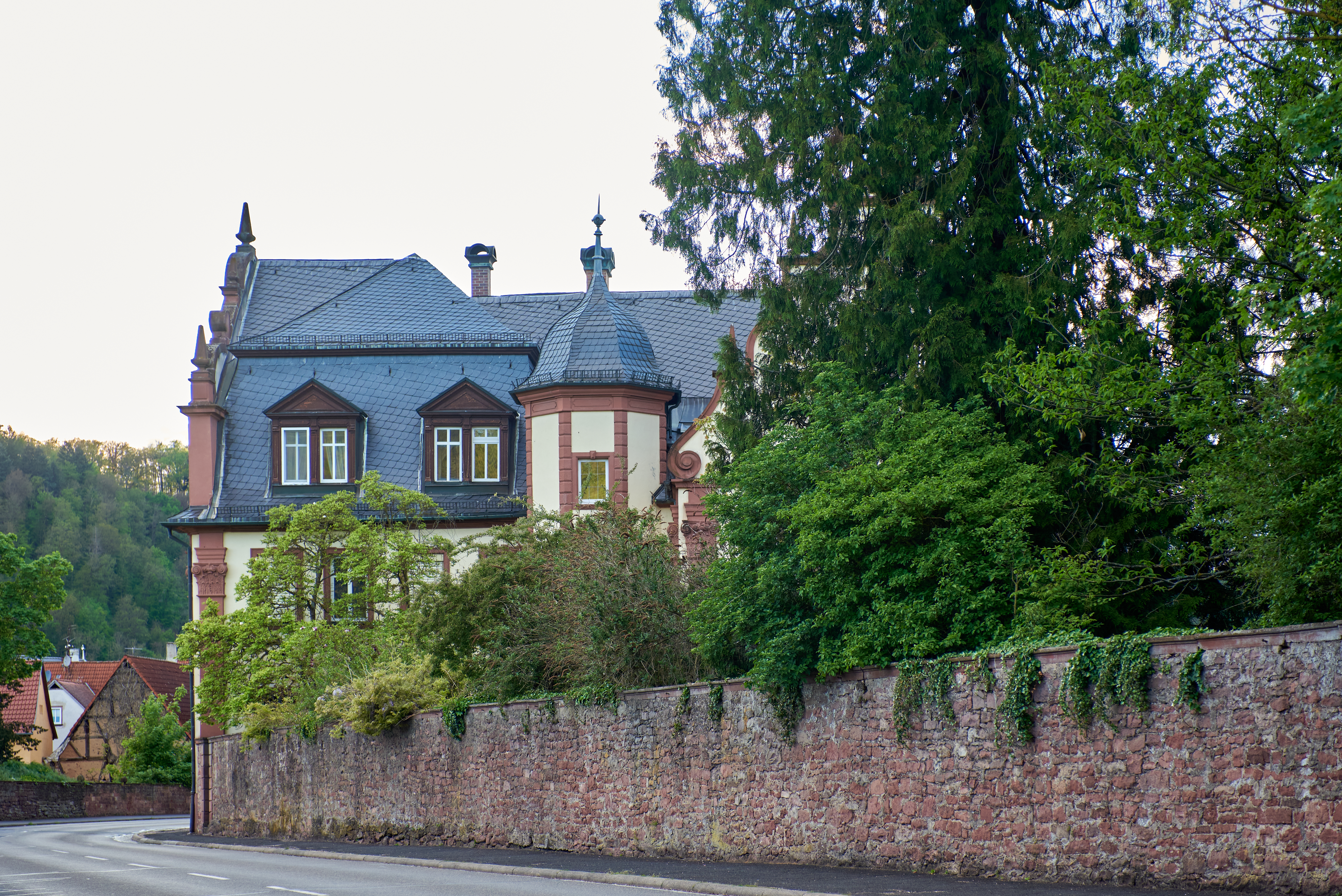
Schloss Kreuzwertheim (2021)

The palace remains privately owned and inhabited by the princely family zu Löwenstein-Wertheim-Freudenberg. Because it is in active residential use, it is not open to the public or to guided tours.

== Architecture ==
The palace is a two-storey Baroque building with a mansard roof and a white sandstone façade, distinguished by later Neo-Renaissance scrolled gables added in the late 19th century. It is a dominant feature of Kreuzwertheim's historic town centre along the main street.

== Literature ==
- Rahrbach, Anton; Schöffl, Jörg; Schramm, Otto (2002). Schlösser und Burgen in Unterfranken (in German). Nürnberg: Hofmann Verlag. pp. 177–178. ISBN 3-87191-309-X.
