= Kreuzwertheim (Verwaltungsgemeinschaft) =

- Verwaltungsgemeinschaft
- Location of Kreuzwertheim within Main-Spessart district
- Interactive map of Kreuzwertheim
- Location within Germany Location within Bavaria
- Coordinates: 49°46′N 9°31′E
- Country: Germany
- State: Bavaria
- Admin. region: Lower Franconia
- District: Main-Spessart
- Seat: Kreuzwertheim
- Subdivisions: 3 municipalities

Area
  - Total: 42.67 km^{2} (16.47 sq mi)

Population (2025-12-31)
  - Total: 5,961
  - Density: 139.7/km^{2} (361.8/sq mi)
- Time zone: UTC+01:00 (CET)
  - Summer (DST): UTC+02:00 (CEST)
- Website: www.vgem-kreuzwertheim.de

Kreuzwertheim is a Verwaltungsgemeinschaft (municipal association) in the district Main-Spessart in Bavaria, Germany. Its seat is in Kreuzwertheim.

It consists of the following municipalities:

1. Hasloch
2. Kreuzwertheim
3. Schollbrunn
