= Grünau Charterhouse =

Former monastery in Bavaria, Germany

Grünau Charterhouse Kartause Grünau
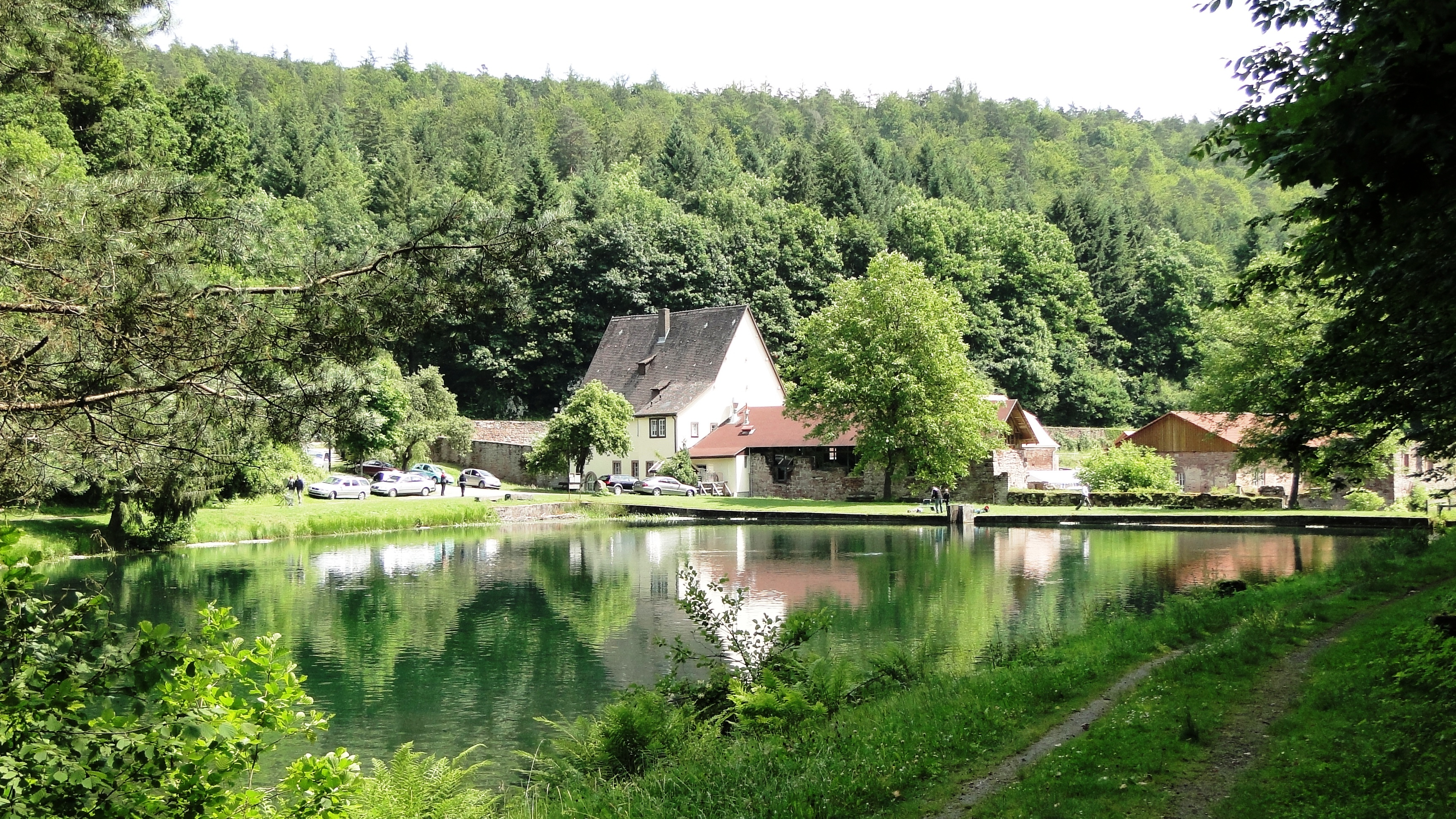
- Kartause Grünau with fish pond and main building (now a restaurant)

- Location within Germany
- Interactive map of Grünau Charterhouse; Kartause Grünau

Monastery information
- Order: Carthusian
- Established: 1328
- Disestablished: 1803
- Diocese: Würzburg

People
- Founder: Elisabeth von Hohenlohe

Architecture
- Heritage designation: listed monument

Site
- Location: Schollbrunn, Bavaria, Germany
- Coordinates: 49°49′04″N 9°28′28″E
- Visible remains: prior's lodging, church, perimeter wall
- Public access: yes (limited)

Grünau Charterhouse (German: Kloster or Kartause Grünau) is a former Carthusian monastery, or charterhouse, in Schollbrunn in Bavaria, Germany. It was the first Carthusian monastery in Franconia and in today's Bavaria.

== Geography ==
The charterhouse is located in the valley of the Kropfbach, a tributary of the Haslochbach. It is surrounded by the wooded hills of the Spessart.

It lies in the municipal territory of Schollbrunn, part of the Main-Spessart district of Bavaria.

== History ==
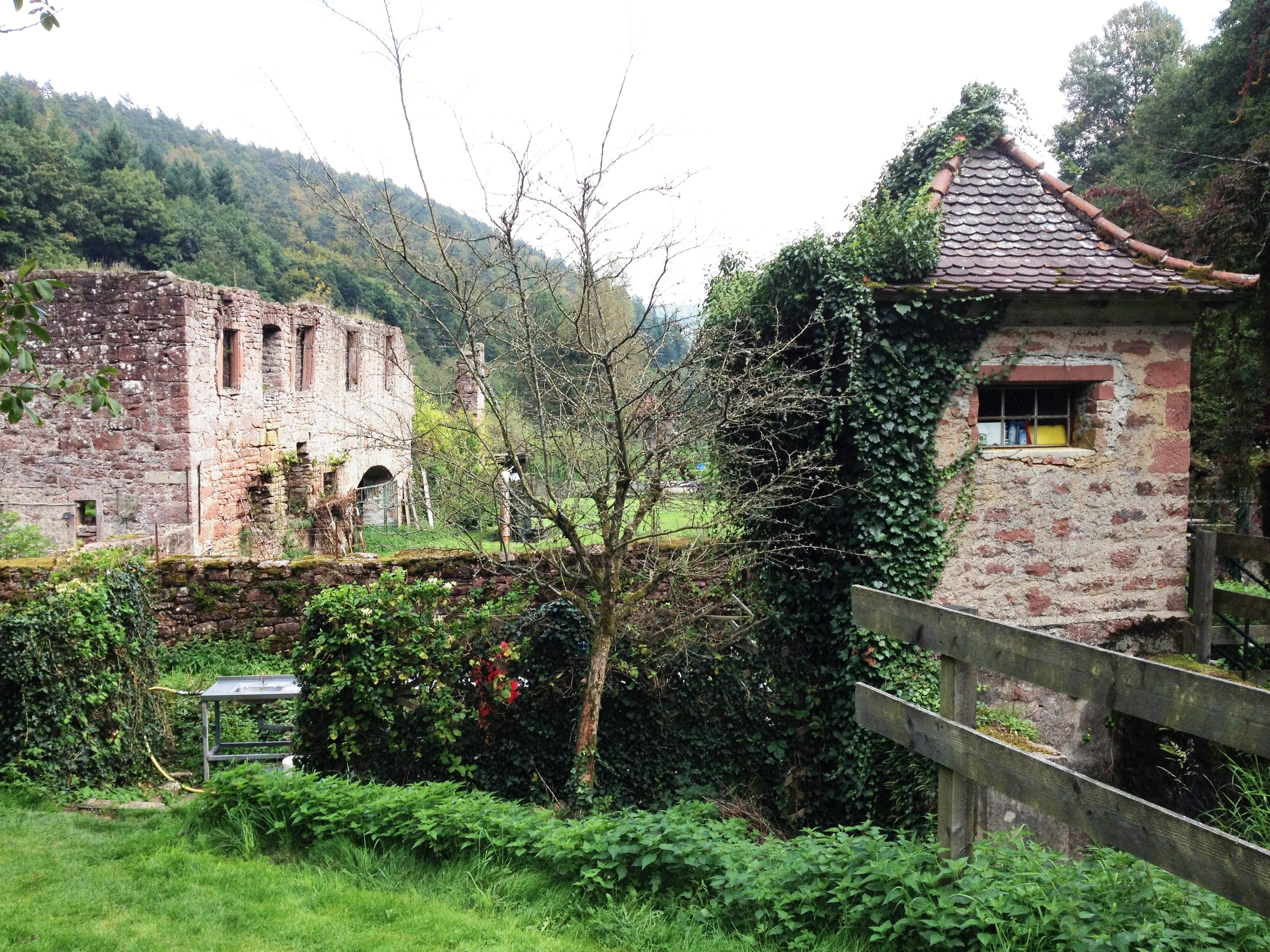
Ruined buildings of the former Carthusian monastery

In 1216, a chapel was consecrated in the Kropfbachtal, dedicated to the Blessed Virgin Mary, Saint Lawrence and Saint Nicholas. In the early 14th century, this chapel became the destination of pilgrims. At the chapel's location, Elisabeth von Hohenlohe, daughter of the Count of Wertheim, donated a Kartause or charterhouse in 1328. In 1333, Carthusians from Mainz, led by the first prior Heinrich Spiegel, settled here, making this the order's first monastery in Franconia and in what is modern-day Bavaria.

The initial Kartause was replaced in the early 15th century by a larger building, housing up to 24 monks. In 1446, a new church for the monastery was consecrated. The Counts of Wertheim were the Vögte of the monastery and its church served as their burial place. It is possible that monks from Grünau settled at the charterhouses at Erfurt and Koblenz in the 14th century.

A Canonical visitation in 1523 discovered a state of affairs that led to the temporary dismissal of prior Michael Lemlein. During the German Peasants' War, the monastery was sacked by peasants in 1525. That year, Count Georg von Wertheim joined the Reformation, and thus the monastery's Vogt now was a Lutheran. In 1545, the Wertheim family took over administration of the monastery's lands. The last three monks left Grünau in 1557.

However, the order fought a prolonged legal battle against the counts at the Reichskammergericht and the Hofkammergericht for restitution of the Kartause. An Imperial edict of 1629 restored property to Catholic owners and Grünau returned to the order. Only two years later, they had to flee from Swedish troops during the chaos of the Thirty Years' War. In 1635, Count Johann Dietrich von Löwenstein-Wertheim restored the buildings and half the original land. Four monks settled there.

The monastery was dissolved in 1803 in the secularisation of Bavaria and the property fell to the Counts of Löwenstein-Wertheim-Freudenberg. The monastery, which had been rebuilt in the early 18th century by the monks, was turned into a Hofgut, an estate owned by the Counts, in 1820.

== Today ==
All that remains of the monastic structures is the prior's lodging, now used for guests, the ruins of the church and the perimeter wall with its archway.

The buildings today house a restaurant and are private property. During business hours, the external areas are mostly accessible to the public.
