= Three hares =

Motif of three hares in threefold rotational symmetry

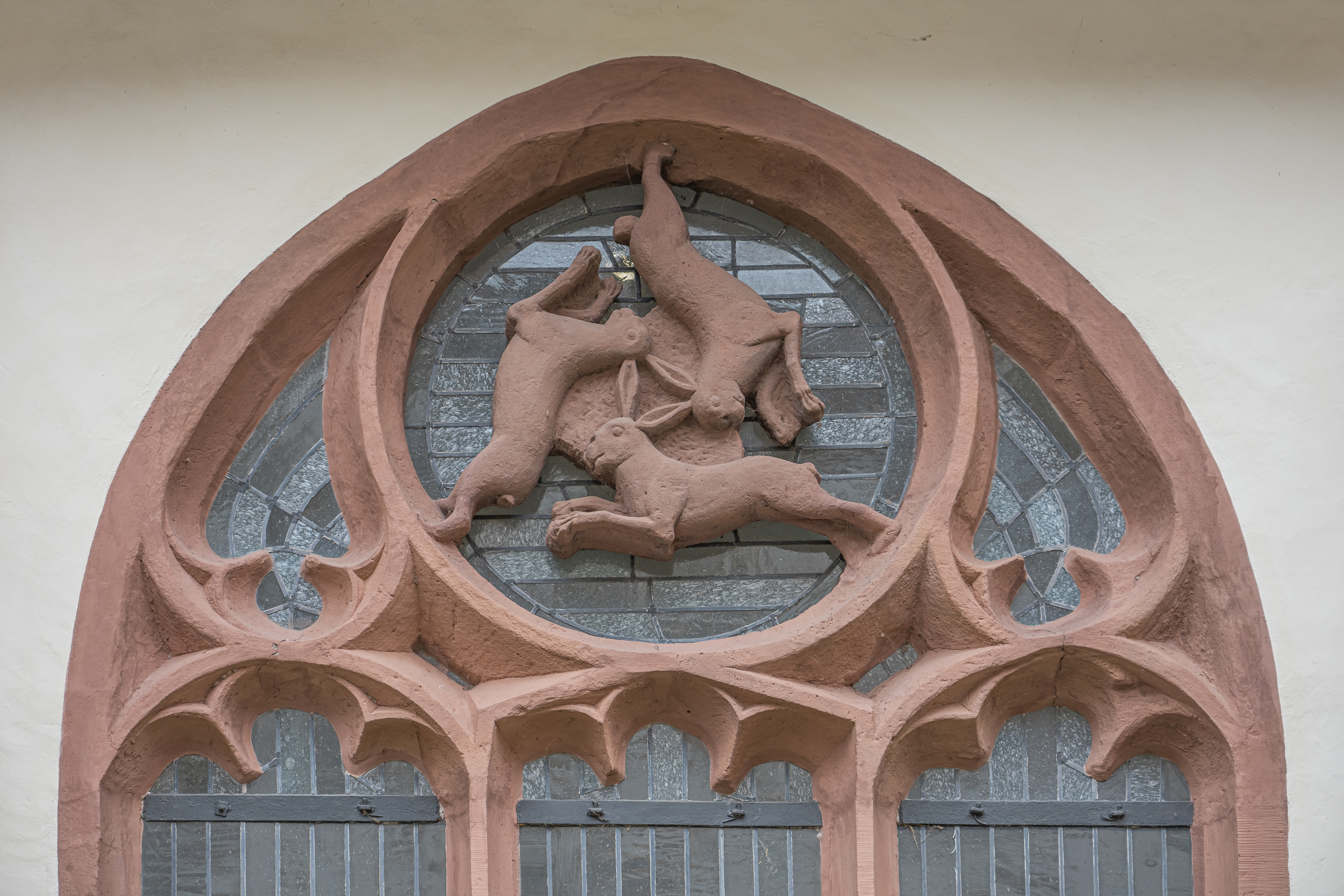
German: Dreihasenfenster, lit. 'Window of Three Hares' in Paderborn Cathedral

The three hares (or three rabbits) is a circular motif appearing in sacred sites from China, the Middle East and the churches and synagogues of Europe, in particular those of Devon, England (as the "Tinners' Rabbits"). It is used as an architectural ornament, a religious symbol, and in other modern works of art or a logo for adornment (including tattoos), jewelry, and a coat of arms on an escutcheon. It is viewed as a puzzle, a visual challenge, and has been rendered as sculpture, drawing, and painting.

The symbol features three hares or rabbits chasing each other in a circle. Like the triskelion, the triquetra, and their antecedents (e.g., the triple spiral), the symbol of the three hares has a threefold rotational symmetry. Each of the ears is shared by two hares, so that only three ears are shown. Although its meaning is apparently not explained in contemporary written sources from any of the medieval cultures where it is found, it is thought to have a range of symbolic or mystical associations with fertility and the lunar cycle. When used in Christian churches, it is presumed to be a symbol of the Trinity. Its origins and original significance are uncertain, as are the reasons why it appears in such diverse locations.

== In the Dunhuang Mogao Caves ==
The earliest known depictions of the three hares motif appear in the zaojing paintings in the Mogao cave temples of Dunhuang, China, dated to the Sui dynasty (6th–7th centuries C.E.). The iconography, named Santu Gonger in Chinese (三兔共耳; lit. 'Three Hares Sharing Ears'), subsequently spread along the Silk Road.

The Santu Gonger motif appears in sixteen of the Mogao Caves and dates between the Sui dynasty and the Five Dynasties. It is always accompanied by lotus motifs reminiscent of the lianhua zaojing (莲花藻井) designs from the Northern Dynasties.

Liu Haiyan of the Dunhuang Academy notes that the zaojing paintings historically had symbolic functions as protection against fire through water symbolism. Both the lotus and the hare were associated with water during the Sui and Tang dynasties—the lotus through its aquatic nature, and the rabbit through its link to the moon and the moon's influence over tides. The popularity of the Santu Gonger motif also coincides with the status of rabbits as a xiangrui (Chinese: 祥瑞), an often officially designated auspicious omen. During the early Tang dynasty, white hares were demoted to a third-level xiangrui, while the blackish-red hares was classified as a second-level xiangrui. Coincidentally, only reddish-black hares appear in early Tang Santu Gonger paintings while other periods had more Santu Gonger designs and with hares in both white and blackish-red colors.

Guan Youhui, a retired researcher from the Dunhuang Academy who spent 50 years studying the decorative patterns in the Mogao Caves, believes the three rabbits—"like many images in Chinese folk art that carry auspicious symbolism—represent peace and tranquility".

== Diffusion on the Silk Road ==
The spread of the three hares symbol between 600 and 1500

The three hares appear on a copper coin, found in Iran, dated to 1281. Another appears on an ancient Islamic-made reliquary from southern Russia. Another 13th or early 14th century box, later used as a reliquary, was made in Iran under Mongol rule, and is preserved in the treasury of the Cathedral of Trier in Germany. On its base, the casket has Islamic designs, and originally featured two images of the three hares. One was lost through damage.

One theory pertaining to the spread of the motif is that it was transported from China across Asia and as far as the south west of England by merchants travelling the Silk Road and that the motif was transported via designs found on expensive Oriental ceramics. This view is supported by the early date of the surviving occurrences in China. However, the majority of representations of the three hares in churches occur in England and northern Germany. This supports a contrary view that the three hares occurred independently as English or early German symbols.

Some claim that the Devon name, Tinners' Rabbits, is related to local tin miners adopting it. The mines generated wealth in the region and funded the building and repair of many local churches, and thus the symbol may have been used as a sign of the miners' patronage. The architectural ornament of the three hares also occurs in churches that are unrelated to the miners of South West England. Other occurrences in England include floor tiles at Chester Cathedral, stained glass at Long Melford, Suffolk (Note: At the Holy Trinity Church, Long Melford, above the northern door, is a small stained glass roundel, only a few inches in diameter. "The three hares window: a medieval mystery". 28 February 2011. Archived from the original on 18 September 2011.) and a ceiling in Scarborough, Yorkshire.

== In Western Europe ==
The motif of the three hares is used in a number of medieval or more recent European churches, particularly in France (e.g., in the Basilica of Notre-Dame de Fourvière in Lyon) and Germany. It occurs with the greatest frequency in the churches of Devon, United Kingdom, where it appears to be a recollection of earlier Insular Celtic design such as the triaxially symmetric triskele and other Romano-British designs which are known from early British 'Celtic' (La Tène) metalwork such as circular enamelled and openwork triskel brooches (fibulae). The motif appears in illuminated manuscripts amongst similar devices such as the anthropomorphic "beard pullers" seen in manuscripts such as the Book of Kells, architectural wood carving, stone carving, window tracery, and stained glass. In South Western England there are over thirty recorded examples of the three hares appearing on 'roof bosses' (carved wooden knobs) on the ceilings in medieval churches in Devon, (particularly Dartmoor). There is a good example of a roof boss of the three hares at Widecombe-in-the-Moor, Dartmoor, with another in the town of Tavistock on the edge of the moor. The motif occurs with similar central placement in Synagogues. Another occurrence is on the ossuary that by tradition contained the bones of St. Lazarus.

Where it occurs in the United Kingdom, the three hares motif usually appears in a prominent place in the church, such as the central rib of the chancel roof, or on a central rib of the nave. This suggests that the symbol held significance to the church, and casts doubt on the theory that they may have been a masons' or carpenters' signature marks. There are two possible and perhaps concurrent reasons why the three hares may have found popularity as a symbol within the church. Firstly, it was believed that the hare was hermaphrodite and could reproduce without loss of virginity. This led to an association with the Virgin Mary, with hares sometimes occurring in illuminated manuscripts and Northern European paintings of the Virgin and Christ Child. The other Christian association may have been with the Holy Trinity, representing the "One in Three and Three in One" of which the triangle or three interlocking shapes such as rings are common symbols. In many locations the three hares are positioned adjacent to the Green Man, a symbol commonly believed to be associated with the continuance of Anglo-Saxon or Celtic paganism. These juxtapositions may have been created to imply the contrast of the Divine with man's sinful, earthly nature.

In Judaism, the shafan in Hebrew has symbolic meaning. (Note: In Hebrew, the rock hyrax is called שפן סלע (shafan sela), meaning rock shafan, where the meaning of shafan is obscure, but is colloquially used as a synonym for rabbit in modern Hebrew. Slifkin, Nosson (1 March 2004). "6" (PDF). Shafan–The Hyrax. Southfield, MI; Nanuet, NY: Zoo Torah in association with Targum/Feldheim Distributed by Feldheim. pp. 99–135. ISBN 1-56871-312-6. Archived from the original (PDF) on 16 June 2012. ISBN 978-1-56871-312-0.) (Note: Although rabbits are listed as a non-kosher animal in the Bible, they at least arguably chew their cud, even though they are not a ruminant, lacking cloven hooves.) Rabbits can carry positive symbolic connotations, like lions and eagles. 16th century German scholar Rabbi Yosef Hayim Yerushalmi, saw the rabbits as a symbol of the Jewish diaspora. The replica of the Chodorow Synagogue from Poland (on display at the Museum of the Jewish Diaspora in Tel Aviv) has a ceiling with a large central painting which depicts a double-headed eagle holds two brown rabbits in its claws without harming them. The painting is surrounded by a citation from the end of Deuteronomy:

כנשר יעיר קינו על גוזליו ירחף. יפרוש כנפיו יקחהו ישאהו על אברתו

— Deuteronomy 32:11, The Song of Moses

This may be translated: "As an eagle that stirreth up her nest, hovereth over her young, spreadeth abroad her wings, taketh them, beareth them on her pinions (...thus is God to the Jewish people)."

The hare frequently appears in the form of the symbol of the rotating rabbits. An ancient German riddle describes this graphic thus:

There are three hares and only three ears,
and yet each hare has two.

This curious graphic riddle can be found in all of the famous wooden synagogues from the period of the 17th and 18th century in the Ashknaz region (in Germany) that are on museum display in Beth Hatefutsoth Museum in Tel Aviv, the Jewish Museum Berlin and The Israel Museum in Jerusalem. They also appear in the Synagogue from Horb am Neckar (donated to the Israel Museum). The three animals adorn the wooden panels of the prayer room from Unterlimpurg near Schwäbisch Hall, which may be seen in replica in the Jewish Museum Berlin. They also are seen in a main exhibit of the Diaspora Museum in Tel Aviv. Israeli art historian Ida Uberman wrote about this house of worship: "... Here we find depictions of three kinds of animals, all organized in circles: eagles, fishes and hares. These three represent the Kabbalistic elements of the world: earth, water and fire/heavens... The fact that they are always three is important, for that number . . . is important in the Kabbalistic context".

Not only do they appear among floral and animal ornaments, but they are often in a distinguished location, directly above the Torah ark, the place where the holy scriptures repose.

They appear on headstones in Sataniv (Сатанів), Khmelnytsky Oblast, western Ukraine.

== As an optical illusion or puzzle ==
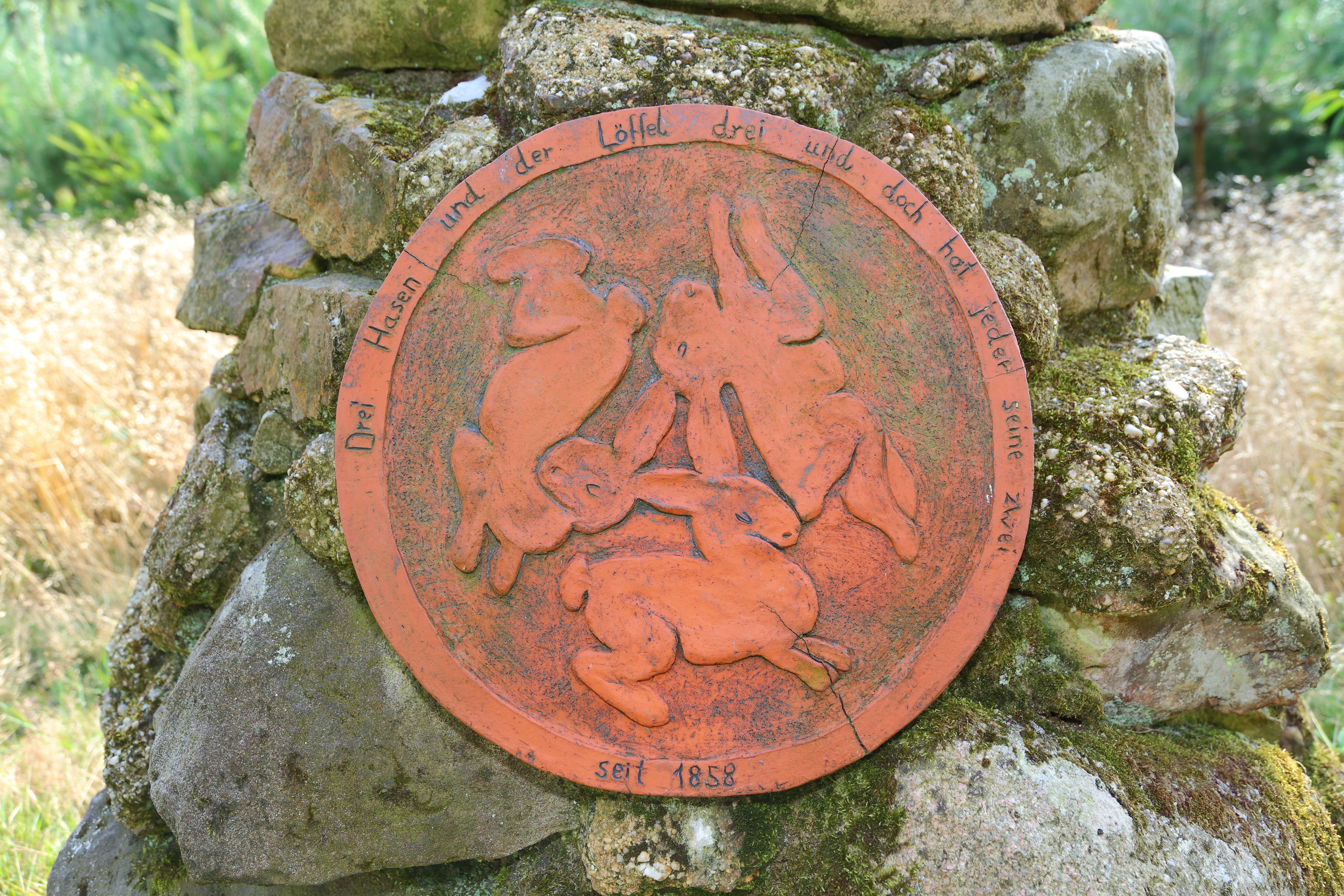
"Drei Hasen und der Löffel drei und doch hat jeder seine zwei." (Germany, 1858)

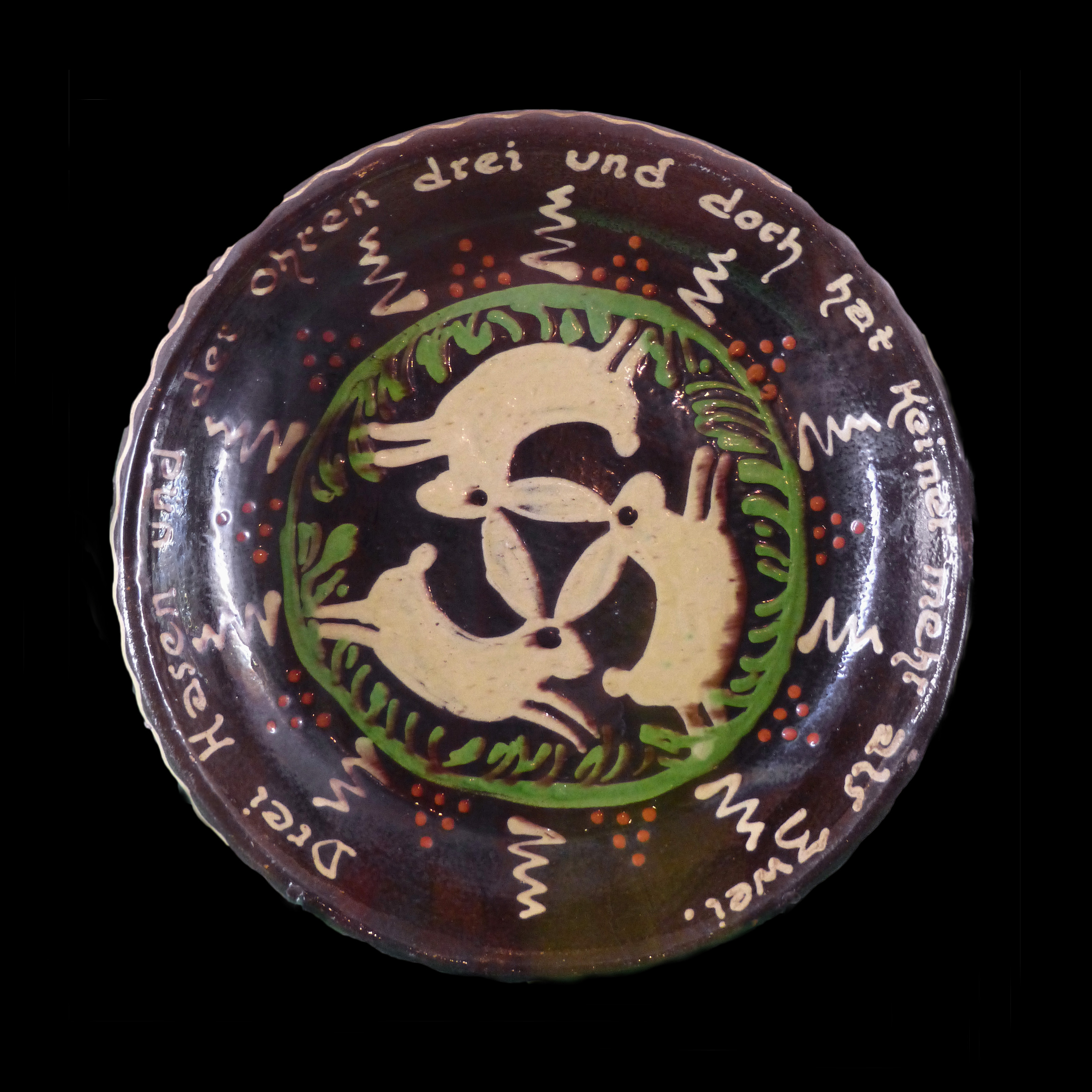
"Drei Hasen und der Ohren drei und doch hat Keiner mehr als Zwei." (Alsace)

"Three hares, and three ears, and yet no one has more than two."

Jurgis Baltrusaitis's 1955 Le Moyen-Âge fantastique: Antiquités et exotismes dans l'art gothique includes a 1576 Dutch engraving with the puzzle given in Dutch and French around the image. This is the oldest known dated example of the motif as a puzzle, with a caption that translates as:

The secret is not great when one knows it.
But it is something to one who does it.
Turn and turn again and we will also turn,
So that we give pleasure to each of you.
And when we have turned, count our ears,
It is there, without any disguise, you will find a marvel.

One recent philosophical book poses it as a problem in perception and an optical illusion—an example of contour rivalry. Each rabbit can be individually seen as correct—it is only when you try to see all three at once that you see the problem with defining the hares' ears. This is similar to "The Impossible Tribar" by Roger Penrose, originated by Oscar Reutersvärd. Compare M.C. Escher's impossible object.

== Other uses and related designs ==
Arms of the village of Hasloch

"Three rabbits" motif Coat of arms of Corbenay, France

- The Community of Hasloch's arms is blazoned as: Azure edged Or three hares passant in triskelion of the second, each sharing each ear with one of the others, in chief a rose argent seeded of the second, in base the same, features three hares. It is said, "The stone with the image of three hares, previously adorned the old village well, now stands beside the town hall." Hasloch is in the Main-Spessart district in the Regierungsbezirk of Lower Franconia (Unterfranken) in Bavaria, Germany.
- Hares and rabbits have appeared as a representation or manifestation of various deities in many cultures, including: Hittavainen, Finnish god of Hares; Kaltes-Ekwa, Siberian goddess of the moon; Jade Rabbit, maker of medicine on the moon for the Chinese gods, depicted often with a mortar and pestle; Ometotchtli (Two Rabbits,) Aztec god of fertility, etc., who led 400 other Rabbit gods known as the Centzon Totochtin; Kalulu, Tumbuka mythology (Central African) Trickster god; and Nanabozho (Great Rabbit,) Ojibway deity, a shape-shifter and a cocreator of the world. See generally, Rabbits in the arts.
- Tinners' Rabbits is the name of a Border Morris dance of many forms involving use of sticks and rotation of three, six or nine dancers.
- The hare is rarely used in British armory; but "Argent, three hares playing bagpipes gules" belongs to the FitzErcald family of ancient Derbyshire. Parenthetically, in heraldry the "Coney", that is the rabbit, is more common than the hare. Three coneys appear in the crests of the families: Marton, co. Lincoln; Bassingthorpe co. Lincoln; Gillingham co. Norfolk and Cunliffe co. Lancashire.
- Ushaw College (St Cuthbert's College, Ushaw) is a Roman Catholic seminary which includes "Three coneys" in its crest. This adornment is from the family coat of arms of William Allen.
- The French crest of the family Pinoteau—dating from the first Baron Pinoteau (1814–1815) and which includes historian Hervé Pinoteau (former vice president of the Académie Internationale d'Héraldique)—includes three rabbits. (Note: Arms Family Pinoteau: Rietstap gives: Quarterly, 1st silver, a lion sable armed and langued reds; to 2e gules, a silver sword adorned with gold and 3e gules, a sword of gold band and a rifle gold bars, in saltire; to 4e Silver, a chevron azure, with three rabbits sand stream.; Borel Hauterive gives, in the Yearbook of the nobility of France and the royal houses of Europe, T. 21, Paris, 1865: Quarterly, 1st silver, a lion sable armed and langued reds; to 2e gules a sword high silver barons fair district military-3e gules, a sword and a rifle gold necklace set with (weapons of honor) to 4e Silver, a chevron azure, three rabbits with sand, which is Brumauld.) See generally, Nobility of the First French Empire.
- Other coats of arms of English and Irish families have three conies or hares.
- "Three Conies Inn" was the name of a 17th-century inn, and three rabbits feeding was used as a motif on the obverse of its trade token. "The property is believed to date from at least the 17th century; the stone sundial above the former front door shows the date 1622. One of the earliest documented references to the property is an advertisement for the sale of a dwelling in the Northampton Mercury in September 1738. The 1777 Militia List also refers to the 'Three Coneys'".
- Among hunters, a collection of three hares ("a brace and a half" or tierce)—or three creatures of any kind, especially greyhounds, foxes, bucks—is called "a leash".
- The cover art for alternative rock band AFI's album Decemberunderground features three hares, albeit in a different configuration.

== See also ==
- Borromean rings
- Decemberunderground
- Flag of Sicily, a similar flag with a triskelion
- Flag of the Isle of Man
- List of fictional hares and rabbits
- Moon gazing hare – Genus of mammals in the family Leporidae
- Moon rabbit – Mythical creature in Asian and Indigenous American folklore that appears on the Moon
- Polycephaly – Condition of having more than one head
- Rabbit rabbit, a British superstition
- Rabbits in the arts
- Rabbits in culture and literature
- Reuleaux triangle – Curved triangle with constant width
- Sator Square – Roman-era word square with a Latin palindrome
- The Three Rabbits, a Hungarian animated short film
- Three Rabbit Islands, in Scotland
- Three wise monkeys
- Three Wolf Moon – T-shirt with three wolves howling at the Moon
- Triple deity – Three deities that are worshipped as one
- Yin yang symbol – Chinese philosophical symbol representing two opposites combined as one
- Rabbit–duck illusion – Optical illusion
