= Faulbach (Main) =

River in Germany

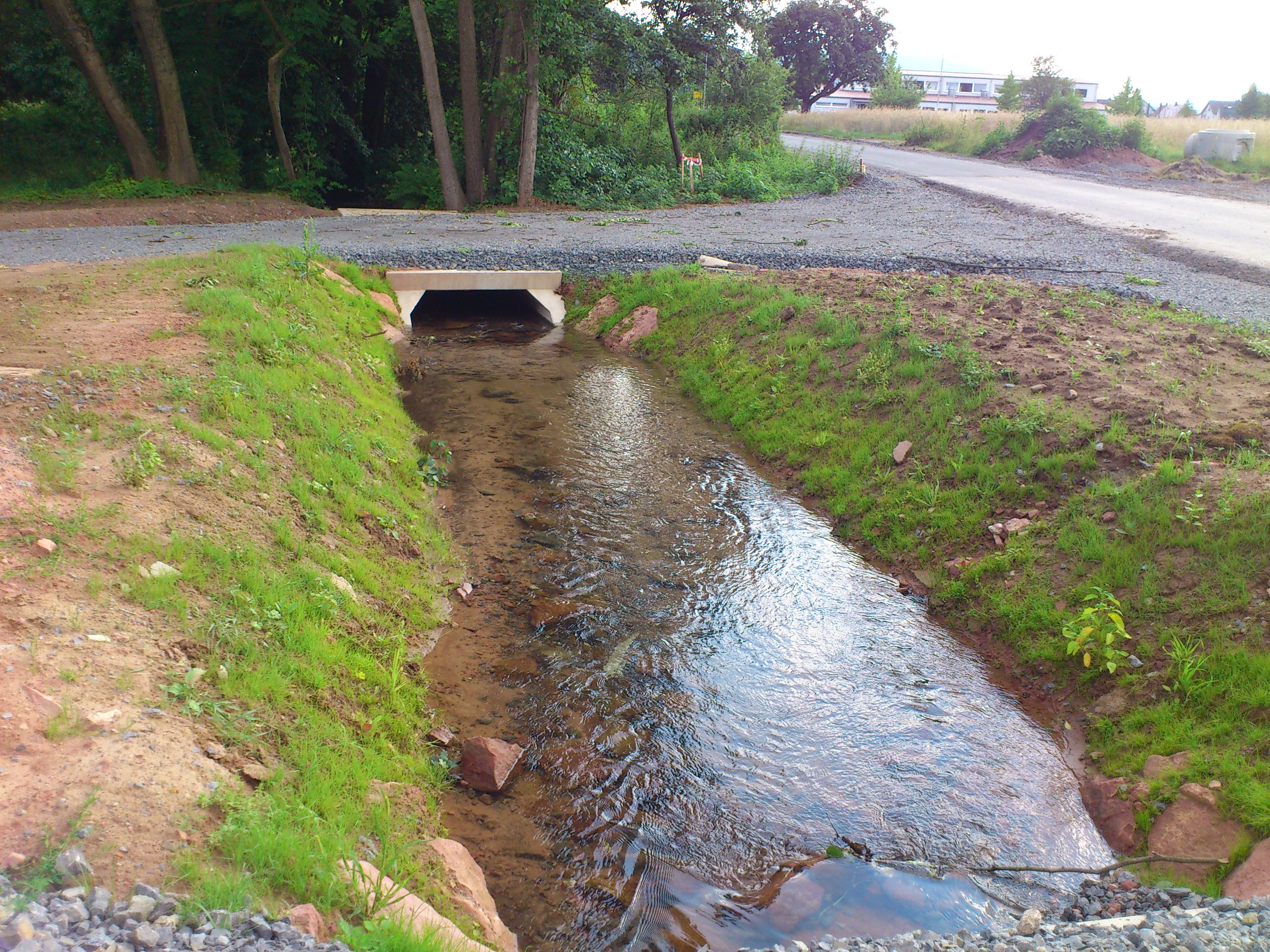
- The riverbed of the Faulbach at the bypass in Faulbach, the main village of the municipality Faulbach

Location
- Country: Germany
- State: Bavaria

Physical characteristics
- Mouth
  - location: Main
  - coordinates: 49.7832°N 9.4397°E

Basin features
- Progression: Main→ Rhine→ North Sea

Faulbach (German pronunciation: [ˈfaʊlbax]) is a river of Bavaria, Germany. The name of this 8.6-kilometre (5.3 mi) long stream is from the vûl for lazy or foul, and Bach, stream. The Faulbach is a tributary of the river Main.

== See also ==
- List of rivers of Bavaria
