= Kreuzwertheim =

- Municipality
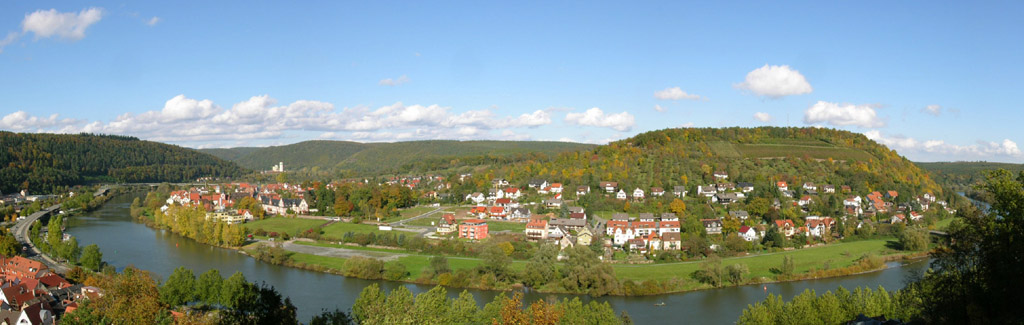
- Kreuzwertheim

- Coat of arms

- Location of Kreuzwertheim within Main-Spessart district
- Interactive map of Kreuzwertheim
- Location within Germany Location within Bavaria
- Coordinates: 49°46′N 9°31′E
- Country: Germany
- State: Bavaria
- Admin. region: Unterfranken
- District: Main-Spessart
- Municipal assoc.: Kreuzwertheim
- Subdivisions: 4 Ortsteile

Government
  - Mayor (2020–26): Klaus Thoma (Ind.)

Area
  - Total: 19.98 km^{2} (7.71 sq mi)
- Elevation: 144 m (472 ft)

Population (2025-12-31)
  - Total: 3,776
  - Density: 189.0/km^{2} (489.5/sq mi)
- Time zone: UTC+01:00 (CET)
  - Summer (DST): UTC+02:00 (CEST)
- Postal codes: 97892
- Dialling codes: 09342
- Vehicle registration: MSP
- Website: www.kreuzwertheim.de

Kreuzwertheim (German: [kʁɔʏtsˈveːɐ̯thaɪm]) is a market municipality in the Main-Spessart district in the Regierungsbezirk of Lower Franconia (Unterfranken) in Bavaria, Germany and the seat of the Verwaltungsgemeinschaft (municipal association) of Kreuzwertheim. It has around 3,800 inhabitants.

== Geography ==
=== Location ===
The municipality lies on the right bank of the river Main on the edge of the Spessart, across the river from the town of Wertheim in Baden-Württemberg.

=== Constituent communities ===
Kreuzwertheim's Ortsteile are (with year of amalgamation and rough population figures):

- Kreuzwertheim, 2,844;
- Unterwittbach, 1977, 207;
- Wiebelbach, 1972, 201;
- Röttbach, 1978, 569.

The municipality has the following Gemarkungen (traditional rural cadastral areas): Kreuzwertheim, Röttbach, Unterwittbach, Wiebelbach.

== History ==
=== Prehistoric ===
As witnessed by finds of stone hatchets, human settlement in the municipal area goes as far back as the Stone Age. The first known description of the settlement names Werdheim, which can be taken to mean "homestead on the safe riverbank", referring to the community's location on the Main.

=== Medieval ===
The municipality's first documentary mention came (quite likely) as early as 779 (as one of the Fulda Abbey's outlying holdings). Werdheim developed into the mother parish for the southeastern Spessart area, which itself was first overseen by the Bishop of Würzburg. In 1009 the town was conferred of market rights by King Heinrich II.

From the early 12th century, one branch of the Reginbodo noble family was naming itself after Wertheim. This family had a new defensive complex built on the Main's left bank, whereby, under this new protection, a new settlement arose, which soon took the name Werdheim. In 1192, today's town of Wertheim (across the river) was first mentioned as Suburbium castri Wertheim. About 1200 this was described as an oppidum (town) and in 1244 as a civitas.

Since this time, a new name has been found to better distinguish the municipality from the one just across the river, one that refers to the stone cross (Kreuz in German) on the marketplace. It was thereafter called Crucwertheim, Heiligen-Creuzeswertheim or also simply Creütz. After Wertheim was granted town rights in 1306, its counterpart across the Main slid into steep decline.

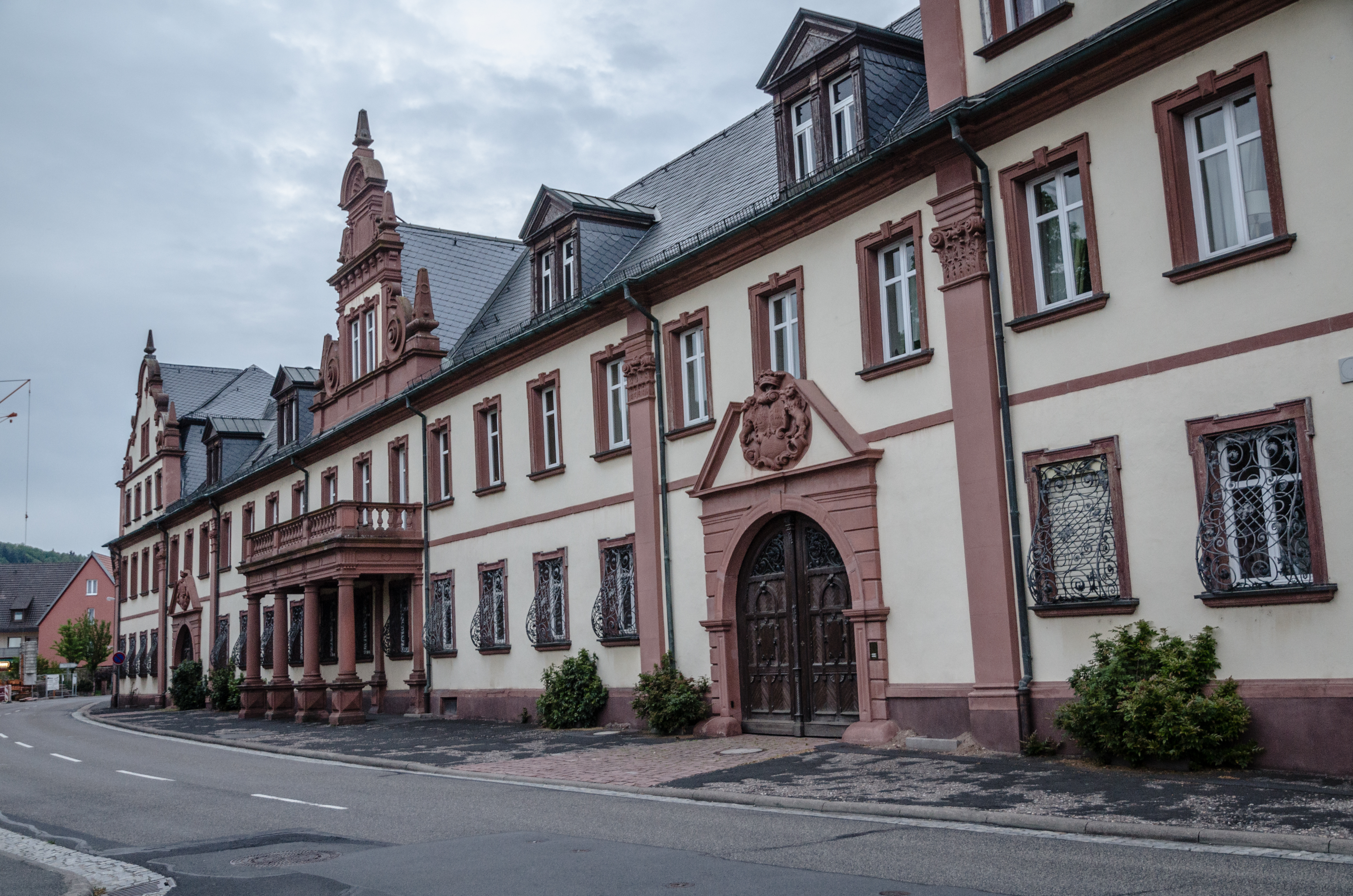
Schloss Kreuzwertheim, residence of the Princes of Löwenstein-Wertheim-Freudenberg since 1736

In 1368, Kreuzwertheim was awarded the right to coin silver Pfennige.

=== Modern ===
In 1736, the Schloss at Kreuzwertheim is built as a dowager house for the Countess of Lowenstein-Wertheim-Rochefort und Virneburg.

The former Amt of the Counts of Löwenstein-Wertheim-Freudenberg was mediatized in favour of Prince Primate von Dalberg's Principality of Aschaffenburg in 1803 and passed in 1814 with this short-lived principality (by this time it had become a department of the Grand Duchy of Frankfurt) to the Kingdom of Bavaria.

== Demographics ==
Within town limits, 3,186 inhabitants were counted in 1970, 3,562 in 1987 and in 2000 3,850.

== Economy ==
According to official statistics, there were 1,046 workers on the social welfare contribution rolls working in producing businesses in 1998. In trade and transport this was 0. In other areas, 150 workers on the social welfare contribution rolls were employed, and 1,434 such workers worked from home. There was one processing business. Eight businesses were in construction, and furthermore, in 1999, there were 17 agricultural operations with a working area of 305 ha, of which 295 ha was cropland and 7 ha was meadowland.

Municipal taxes in 1999 amounted to €2,842,000 (converted), of which net business taxes amounted to €1,021,000.

What is today the Spessart-Brauerei was founded in 1809. In 1884, the Lutz family took it over. Lutz-Brauerei received its current name in 1975.

== Governance ==
=== Mayors ===
- since 2014 Klaus H. Thoma (independent, but nominated by CSU/Freie Wählervereinigung)
- 1996—2014 Horst E. Fuhrmann, CSU
- 1984—1996 Christa Schoenberg, CSU
- 1978—1984 Gerald Amarell, Freie Wählervereinigung
- 1972—1978 Hans Schneider, CSU (d. 1978)
- 1945—1972 Philipp Günzelmann, SPD
- 1925—1945 Georg Fröber
- 1906—1925 Andreas Dinkel
- 1888—1905 Georg M. Fröber

=== Coat of arms ===
The community's arms might be described thus: Per fess in chief argent a Celtic cross barby issuant from the line of partition sable, in base azure three roses of the first seeded Or.

The municipality's oldest surviving seal dates from 1600, and it, too, bore the Celtic cross in reference to the one that still stands in the marketplace. The municipality's current arms, conferred in 1958, still bear this charge in the upper half of the escutcheon, and in the lower half are the arms once borne by the Counts of Wertheim.

== Attractions ==
Historic monuments include the church square(Kirchplatz) with its still preserved market cross and well, the historic house located at Kirchplatz-4 built in the mid-1500's and surrounding back alleys and lanes. The old fortress church, the Schultheiß (mayor) Peter Herrschaft's house (built in 1594), the well and the remnants of the old fortifications. Moreover, the Schloss (palace) still serves as the Löwenstein-Wertheim-Freudenberg princely family's seat today. In addition, two of the original four towers; Hauptstrasse turm(tower) and Pfargasse turm(tower)that were part of the wall fortification that encircled the old town during medieval times, are still present.

== Education ==
- Kindergartens: 2 (150 places with 133 children)
- Primary school (1st-2nd class)
- Primary school and Hauptschule (3rd-9th class)

== Notable people ==
- Johann Georg Fehn (1880–1950), clergyman and politician (DDP), Member of the Bavarian Landtag
