= Faulbach =

- Municipality
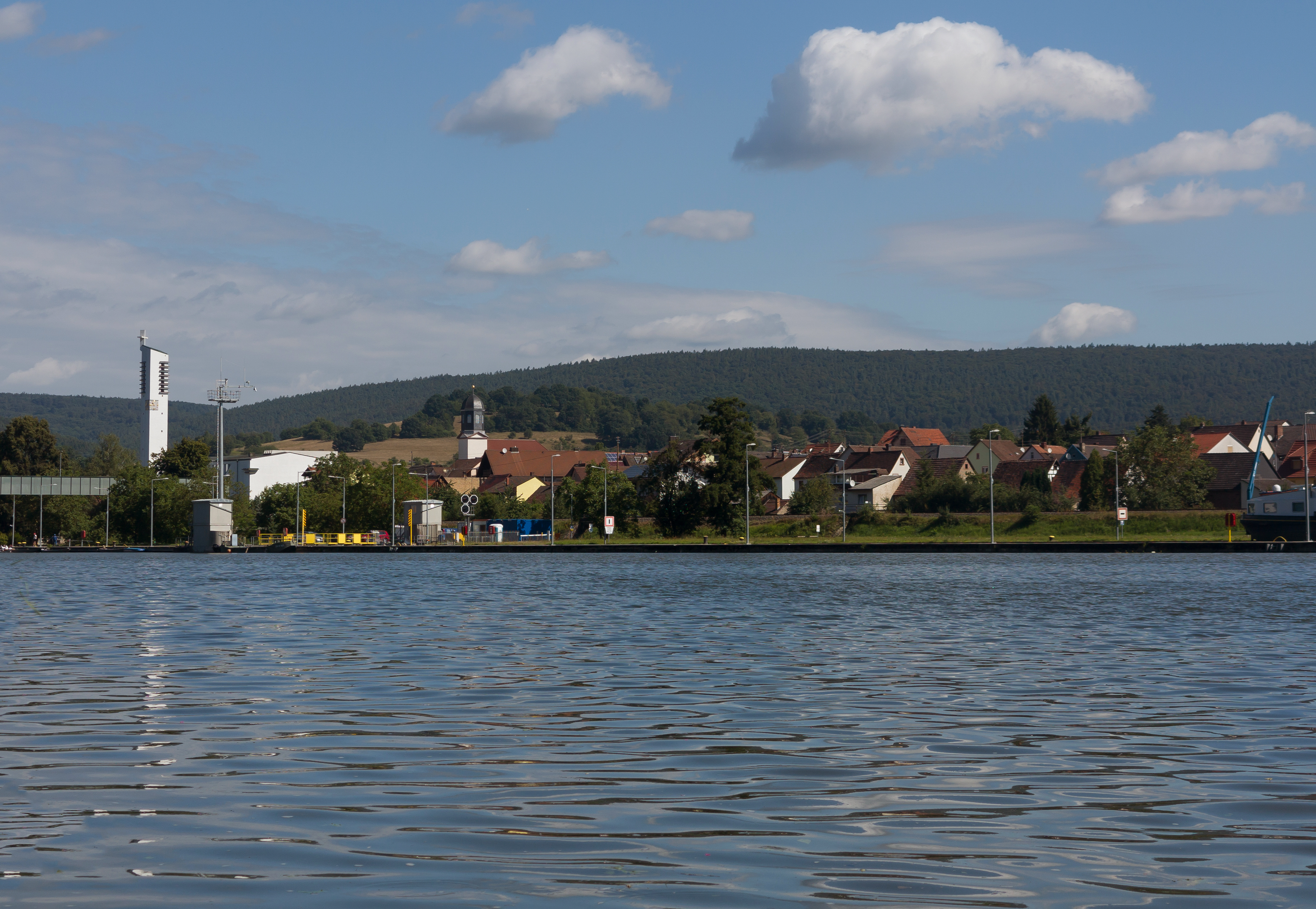
- View of Faulbach from the Main

- Coat of arms

- Location of Faulbach within Miltenberg district
- Interactive map of Faulbach
- Location within Germany Location within Bavaria
- Coordinates: 49°47′N 9°27′E
- Country: Germany
- State: Bavaria
- Admin. region: Unterfranken
- District: Miltenberg
- Subdivisions: 2 Ortsteile

Government
  - Mayor (2020–26): Wolfgang Hörnig (SPD)

Area
  - Total: 10.99 km^{2} (4.24 sq mi)
- Elevation: 142 m (466 ft)

Population (2025-12-31)
  - Total: 2,566
  - Density: 233.5/km^{2} (604.7/sq mi)
- Time zone: UTC+01:00 (CET)
  - Summer (DST): UTC+02:00 (CEST)
- Postal codes: 97906
- Dialling codes: 09392
- Vehicle registration: MIL
- Website: www.faulbach.de

Faulbach (German pronunciation: [ˈfaʊlbax]) is a municipality in the Miltenberg district in the Regierungsbezirk of Lower Franconia (Unterfranken) in Bavaria, Germany. It has a population of around 2,600.

== Geography ==
=== Location ===
Faulbach lies on the right bank of the river Main, between Wertheim am Main and Miltenberg, where it is joined by the Faulbach. Around the municipality lie the hills of the Spessart. At Faulbach, the Main is the border between the states of Bavaria and Baden-Württemberg.

=== Subdivision ===
The community has the following Gemarkungen (traditional rural cadastral areas): Breitenbrunn, Faulbach.

== History ==
The Electoral Mainz Amt became, in accordance with the 1803 Reichsdeputationshauptschluss part of Prince Primate von Dalberg’s newly formed Principality of Aschaffenburg, with which it passed in 1814 (by this time it had become a department of the Grand Duchy of Frankfurt) to the Kingdom of Bavaria. In the course of administrative reform in Bavaria, the current community came into being with the Gemeindeedikt (“Municipal Edict”) of 1818.

== Demographics ==
Within town limits, 2,466 inhabitants were counted in 1970, 2,502 in 1987 and in 2000 2,795.

== Economy ==
According to official statistics, there were 465 workers on the social welfare contribution rolls working in producing businesses in 1998. In trade and transport this was 55. In other areas, 126 workers on the social welfare contribution rolls were employed, and 1,064 such workers worked from home. There were 62 processing businesses. Three businesses were in construction, and furthermore, in 1999, there were 10 agricultural operations with a working area of 127 ha, of which 68 ha was cropland and 59 ha was meadowland.

Municipal taxes in 1999 amounted to €1,743,000 (converted), of which net business taxes amounted to €602,000.

== Governance ==
The mayor is Wolfgang Hörnig (SPD).

=== Coat of arms ===
The community’s arms might be described thus: Per fess, gules a wheel spoked of six Or and argent a bend wavy azure with a base of grass proper.

The arms come from a village seal from the 17th century. Faulbach ended up in Electoral Mainz’s hands after a territorial swap with the Teutonic Knights in 1484 and stayed with Mainz until the Old Empire came to an end in 1803. The Wheel of Mainz (here shown in gold instead of the silver found in most civic arms that bear this charge) recalls the community’s long history as an Electoral Mainz holding, as do the tinctures gules and argent (red and silver). The wavy fess stands for the community’s namesake brook, while the grass represents the brook's banks.

The arms have been borne since 1956.

== Education ==
In 1999 the following institutions existed in Faulbach:

- Kindergartens: 125 places with 108 children
- Primary schools: 1 with 25 teachers and 464 pupils
