= Karbach =

Karbach may refer to:

- Karbach, Bavaria, a market community in the Main-Spessart district of Lower Franconia in Bavaria, Germany
- Karbach, Rhineland-Palatinate, an Ortsgemeinde in the Rhein-Hunsrück-Kreis in Rhineland-Palatinate, Germany
  - FC Karbach, a German association football club from Karbach
- Karbach (Main), a river of Bavaria, Germany, tributary of the Main
- Karbach Brewing Company, a macrobrewery based in Houston, Texas, USA
