= Rothenfels =

- Town
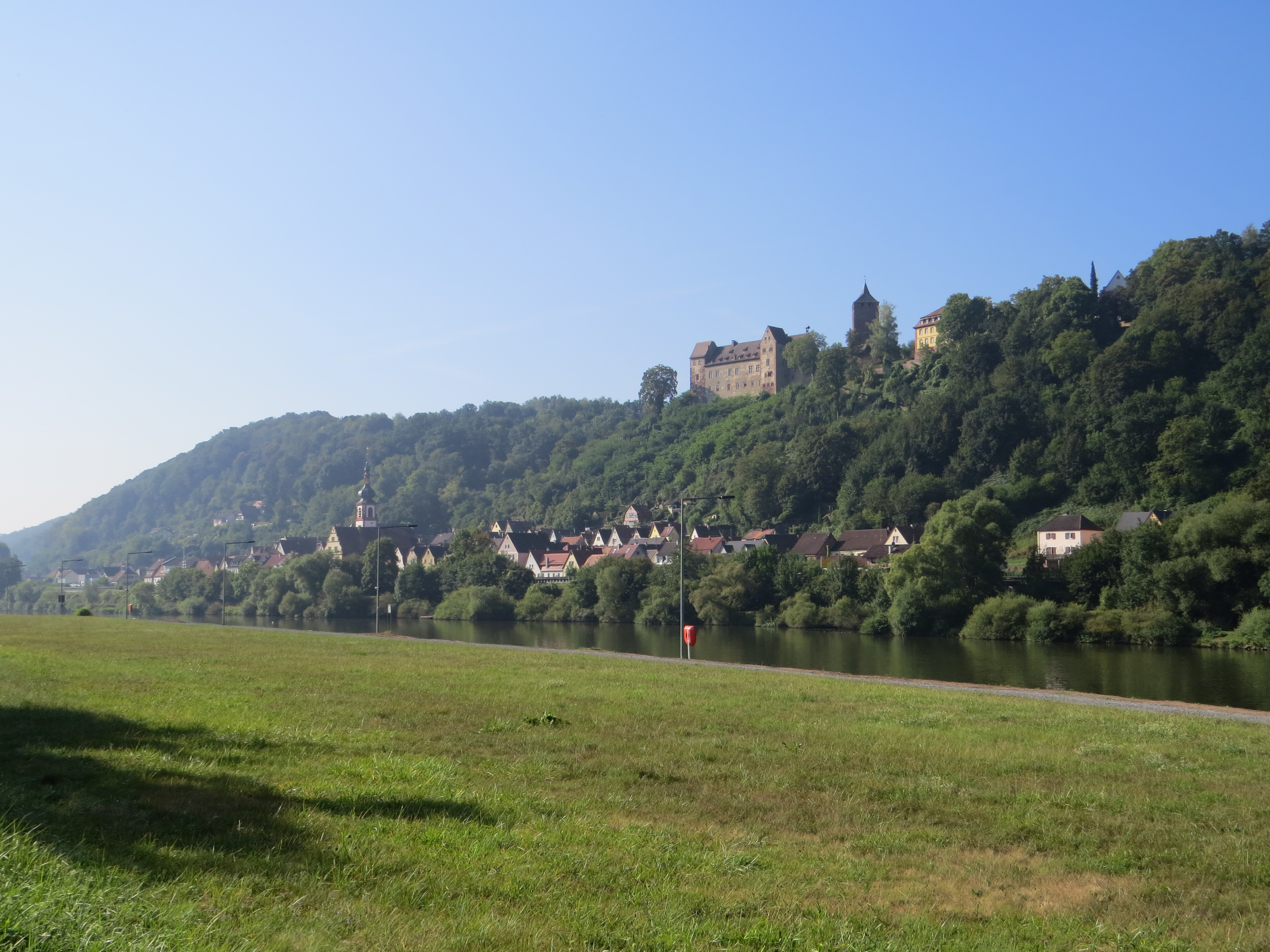
- Rothenfels from the northeast across the Main, Rothenfels Castle in the background

- Coat of arms

- Location of Rothenfels within Main-Spessart district
- Interactive map of Rothenfels
- Location within Germany Location within Bavaria
- Coordinates: 49°53′N 9°35′E
- Country: Germany
- State: Bavaria
- Admin. region: Unterfranken
- District: Main-Spessart
- Municipal assoc.: Marktheidenfeld

Government
  - Mayor (2020–26): Michael Gram

Area
  - Total: 12.07 km^{2} (4.66 sq mi)
- Elevation: 154 m (505 ft)

Population (2025-12-31)
  - Total: 948
  - Density: 78.5/km^{2} (203/sq mi)
- Time zone: UTC+01:00 (CET)
  - Summer (DST): UTC+02:00 (CEST)
- Postal codes: 97851
- Dialling codes: 09393
- Vehicle registration: MSP
- Website: www.rothenfels.de

Rothenfels (German pronunciation: [ˈʁoːtn̩ˌfɛls]) is a town in the Main-Spessart district in the Regierungsbezirk of Lower Franconia (Unterfranken) in Bavaria, Germany, and a member of the Verwaltungsgemeinschaft (municipal association) of Marktheidenfeld. With a population of just around 1,000, it is said to be Bavaria's smallest town.

== Geography ==
=== Location ===
Rothenfels lies on the Main's right bank between Lohr and Marktheidenfeld, 5 km north of Marktheidenfeld, and 33 km east of Aschaffenburg. Squeezed as it is between the river and a bluff, the town consists of little more than a main street. Since 2006, the Maindamm, previously part of the railway line Lohr-Wertheim has been used as a town bypass.

=== Neighbouring communities ===
From the north, clockwise: Neustadt am Main, Marktheidenfeld, Hafenlohr, Fürstlich Löwensteinscher Park (gemeindefreies Gebiet).

=== Subdivisions ===
Rothenfels has two Stadtteile, Rothenfels in the valley of the Main and Bergrothenfels on the hill, next to Rothenfels Castle (Burg Rothenfels).

== History ==
Marquardt II von Grumbach, Vogt of Neustadt Abbey, built a "hunting lodge" on the hill where the castle stands today. However, the land was property of the abbey, and the neighbours felt threatened by the fortification. The king asked the Prince-Bishop of Würzburg to settle the conflict. As a result of his mediation, Marquardt received the land as a fief in 1150, but he had to pay an annual rent to the abbey. Around 1200 the castle was rebuilt, and the bergfried was made from large bunter blocks on a square plan. Construction of the new castle wall also started with large blocks but was finished with quarrystone.

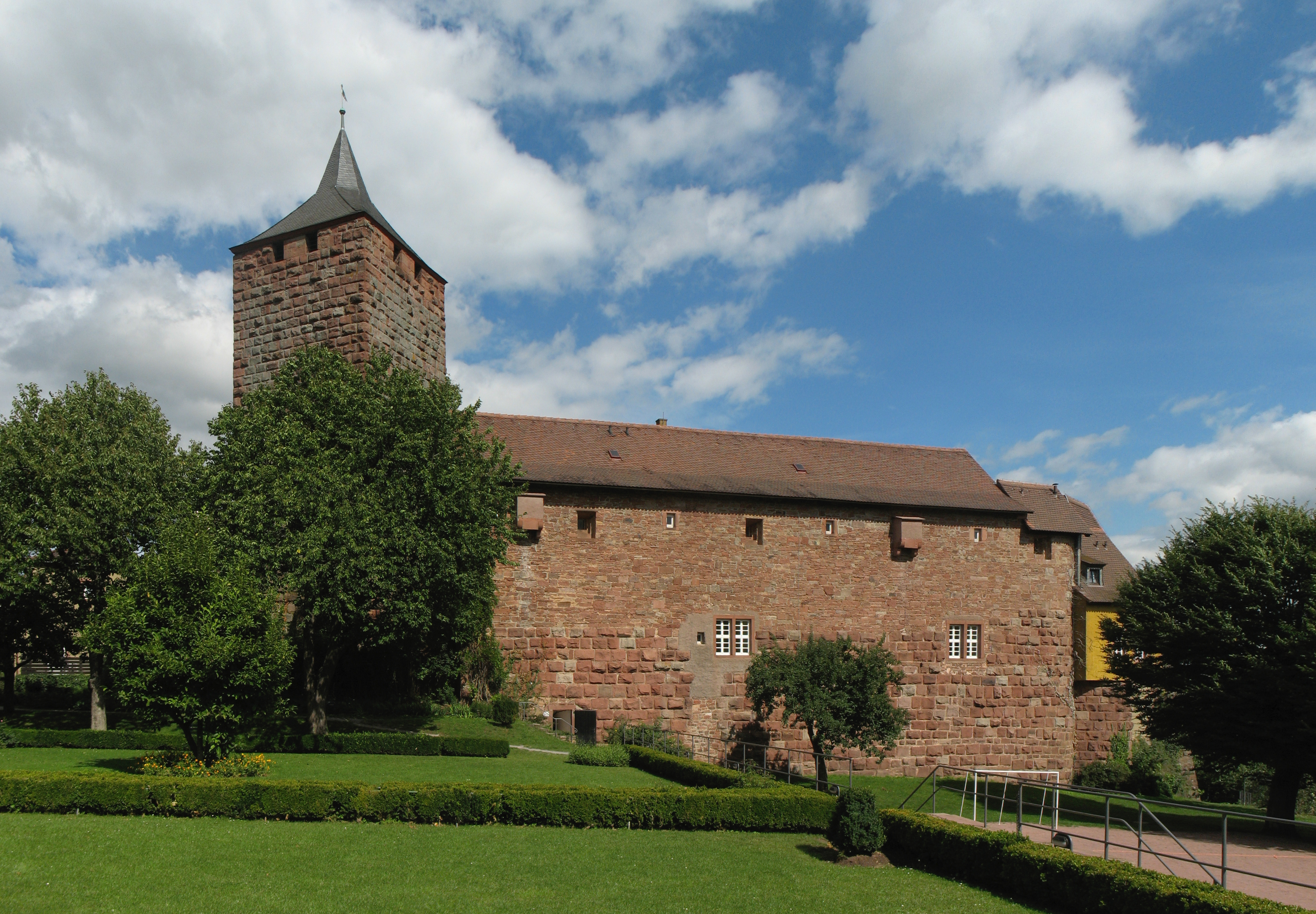
Rothenfels Castle, with bunter bergfried and wall

The settlements, which arose under Rothenfels Castle's protection, were the later town in the valley and the farming estate that later became Bergrothenfels. When, in 1243, Albert II, the last of the Gumbach family died, town and castle came to the Counts of Rieneck. Ludwig III of Rieneck had married Albert's daughter. However, a document from 1150 stated that the castle should return to Neustadt Abbey in such a case. The abbey was not able to enforce its claim, Würzburg offered no support but rather helped to appoint the Count of Rieneck as vogt of Neustadt Abbey. Thus the County added a southern property to its northern possessions around Rieneck and Lohr. In 1333, Count Ludwig V of Rieneck-Rothenfels died and an inheritance dispute ensued. After prolonged legal fighting, the Counts lost their territory to the Archbishopric of Mainz, the Prince-Bishop of Würzburg and the Lords of Hanau. Rothenfels came to Würzburg. A document from 1342 refers to Rothenfels as a town.

In the 16th and early 17th century Rothenfels faced hardships, e.g. during the German Peasants War (1525) when the insurgents occupied and burned the castle. In the second half of the 16th century the town prospered based on shipping, fishing, trade and local crafts. This is the era in which the representative dwellings still extant were constructed in the town (see below). Around 1600 Rothenfels was the site of witch hunts in which around 100 women and men were charged with witchcraft, tortured and often killed. The Thirty Years' War brought another period of destruction: the castle was repeatedly occupied by passing armies and sacked. The population declined due to famine and plague.

During German Mediatisation in the early 19th century, the Prince-Bishopric became the Grand Duchy of Würzburg. Castle and Amt Rothenfels passed to the princely house of Löwenstein-Wertheim-Rosenberg in 1803, and then in 1806 to the Principality of Aschaffenburg; in 1813, Rothenfels became part of the Kingdom of Bavaria. The castle remained property of the Lowenstein family.

In 1881, the Lohr–Wertheim line was opened, connecting the town to the railway system.

After World War II many Vertriebene came to the area, but Rothenfels remained the smallest municipality with town rights in Bavaria.

Bergrothenfels was separated administratively from Rothenfels in the 19th century, only to be reamalgamated in the 1971 Gebietsreform.

== Governance ==
=== Mayor ===
From 1996 to 2014 Rosemarie Richartz (Stadtrat 96) was the mayor of Rothenfels. Since 2014 Michael Gram (Unabhängige Bürger/Freie Bürger/SPD) is the new mayor.

=== Coat of arms ===
The town's arms might be described thus: Or in base water argent, issuant therefrom three crags gules, in chief the letter R of the same.

The town's oldest known seal, carved in the late 16th century and known from a 1619 imprint, only showed the uppercase R. The same image is shown in a roll of arms from 1544, wherein the R is shown in red on a silver field. Shown on town and council seals from 1710 is a castle on crags, which are surmounted by the uppercase R (that is, the R is on the crags, not over them), possibly canting for the town's name, which means "Stronghold in Red Bunter". Since the early 19th century, all examples of the town's seal show the current composition. The arms were affirmed in 1836.

== Attractions ==
Aside from its late-16th century town hall and the former Spital (1578–97), the town features some historic timber-frame houses from the 16th and 17th centuries.

The parish church was originally built in the 15th century, serving both Rothenfels and Bergrothenfels. It was renovated in 1610/1. The Baroque tower dates from 1750.

On the hill above the town stands Rothenfels Castle (Burg Rothenfels). Rothenfels Castle is associated with the Catholic youth movement "Quickborn" (named after Quickborn in Schleswig-Holstein), and serves as a Christian education and conference centre. The castle is also a German Youth Hostel Association (DJH) youth hostel.

== Gallery ==
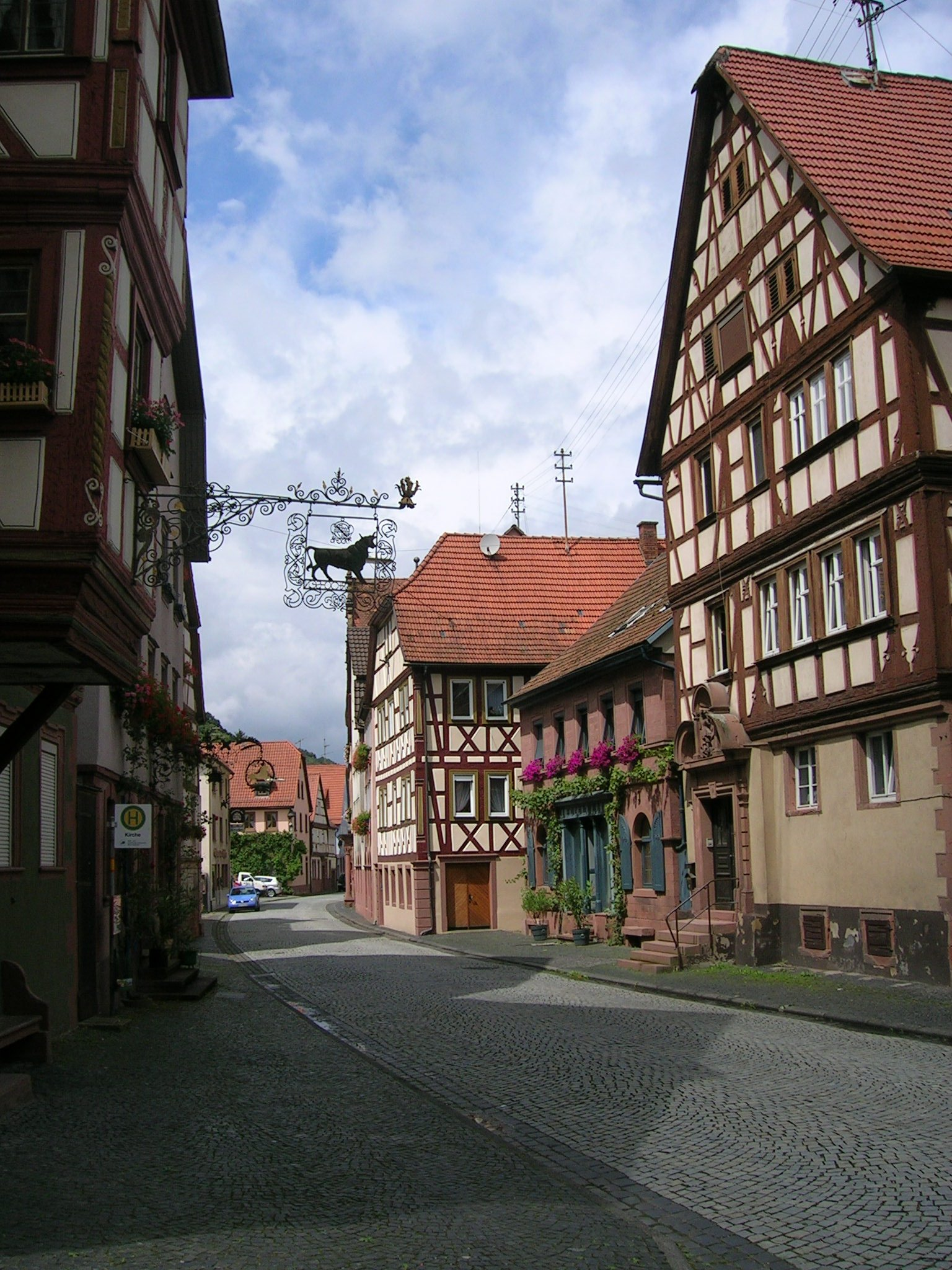
Main street

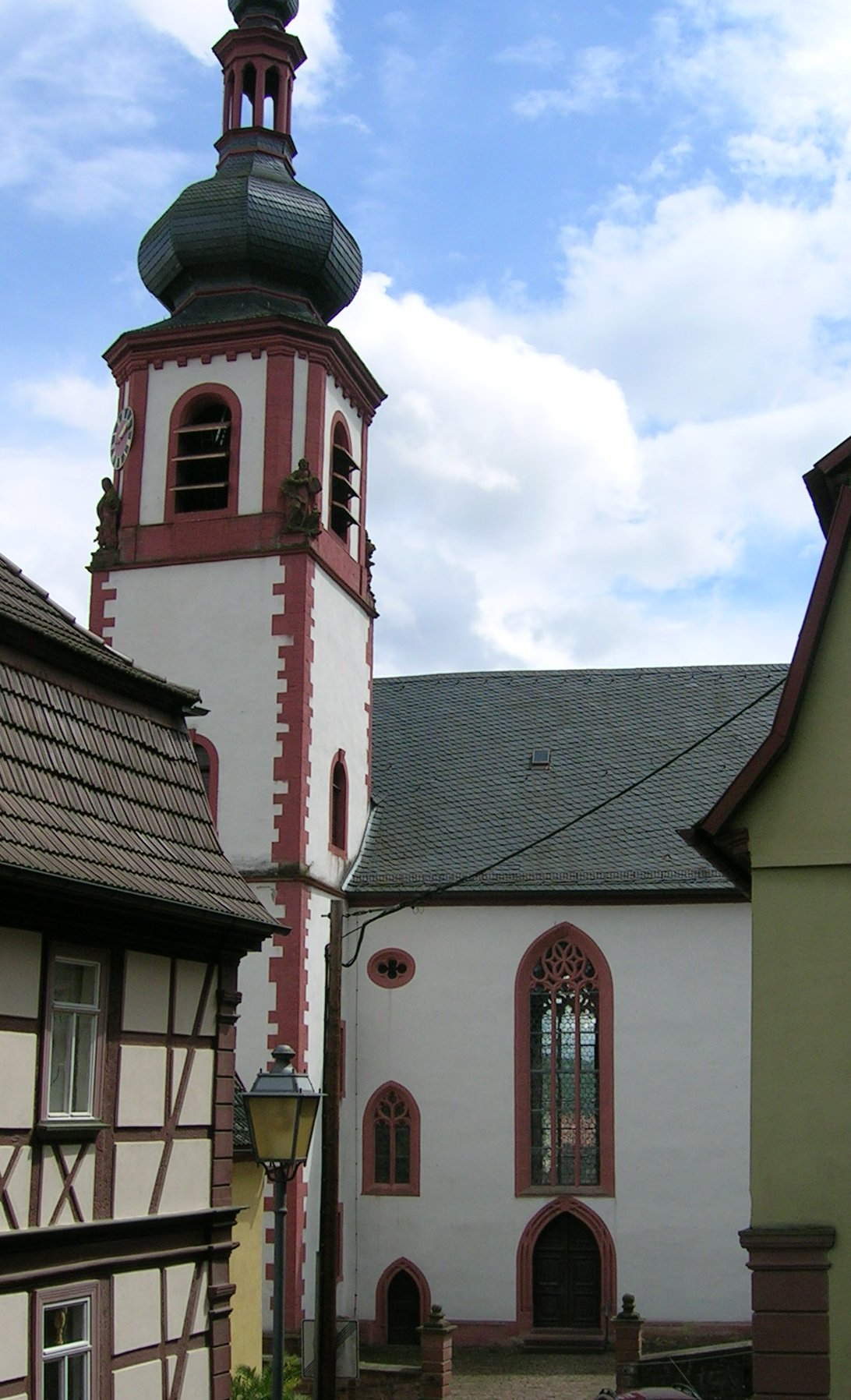
Church

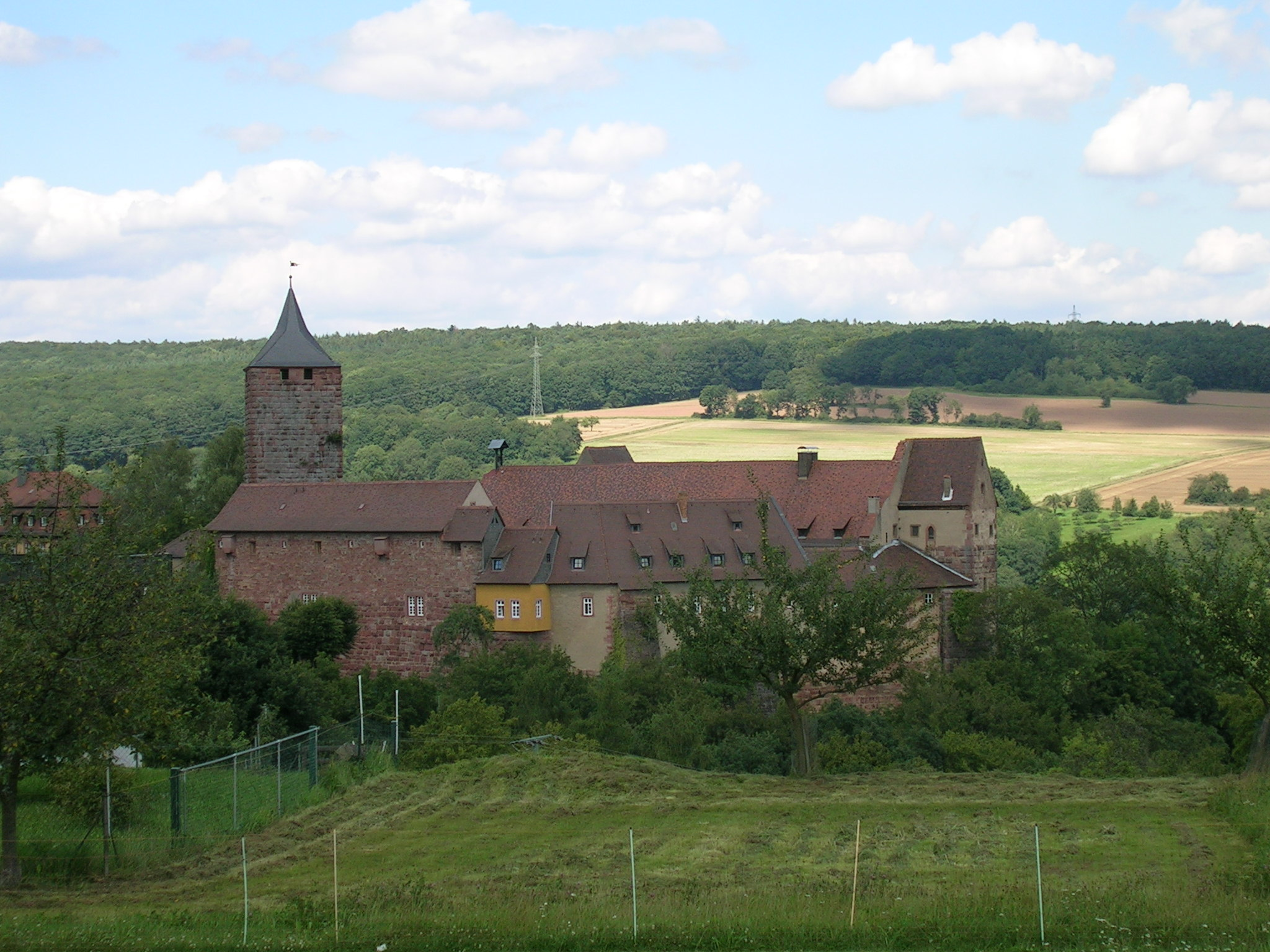
Rothenfels Castle
