= Glasbach =

Glasbach may refer to:

- Glasbach, a small river of North Rhine-Westphalia, Germany, tributary of the Wupper
- Glasbach (Main), a river of Bavaria, Germany, tributary of the Main
- Glasbach (Moosbach), a small river in the suburb Herdern of Freiburg, Baden-Württemberg, Germany
- Mellenbach-Glasbach, Glasbach is one part of this municipality in Thuringia, Germany
