= Marktheidenfeld (Verwaltungsgemeinschaft) =

- Verwaltungsgemeinschaft
- Location of Marktheidenfeld within Main-Spessart district
- Interactive map of Marktheidenfeld
- Location within Germany Location within Bavaria
- Coordinates: 49°49′N 9°38′E
- Country: Germany
- State: Bavaria
- Admin. region: Lower Franconia
- District: Main-Spessart
- Seat: Marktheidenfeld
- Subdivisions: 9 municipalities

Area
  - Total: 178.93 km^{2} (69.09 sq mi)

Population (2025-12-31)
  - Total: 14,968
  - Density: 83.653/km^{2} (216.66/sq mi)
- Time zone: UTC+01:00 (CET)
  - Summer (DST): UTC+02:00 (CEST)
- Website: www.vgem-marktheidenfeld.de

Marktheidenfeld is a Verwaltungsgemeinschaft (municipal association) in the district Main-Spessart in Bavaria, Germany. Its seat is in Marktheidenfeld, itself not part of the Verwaltungsgemeinschaft.

It consists of the following municipalities:

1. Birkenfeld
2. Bischbrunn
3. Erlenbach bei Marktheidenfeld
4. Esselbach
5. Hafenlohr
6. Karbach
7. Roden
8. Rothenfels
9. Urspringen
