= Roden, Bavaria =

Roden
- Municipality
- Coat of arms

- Location of Roden within Main-Spessart district
- Interactive map of Roden
- Location within Germany Location within Bavaria
- Coordinates: 49°53′N 9°37′E
- Country: Germany
- State: Bavaria
- Admin. region: Unterfranken
- District: Main-Spessart
- Municipal assoc.: Marktheidenfeld

Government
  - Mayor (2020–26): Johannes Albert (CSU)

Area
  - Total: 20.05 km^{2} (7.74 sq mi)
- Elevation: 252 m (827 ft)

Population (2025-12-31)
  - Total: 1,008
  - Density: 50.27/km^{2} (130.2/sq mi)
- Time zone: UTC+01:00 (CET)
  - Summer (DST): UTC+02:00 (CEST)
- Postal codes: 97849
- Dialling codes: 09396
- Vehicle registration: MSP
- Website: www.roden.de

Roden is a municipality in the Main-Spessart district in the Regierungsbezirk of Lower Franconia (Unterfranken) in Bavaria, Germany and a member of the Verwaltungsgemeinschaft (Administrative Community) of Marktheidenfeld.

== Geography ==
=== Location ===
Roden lies between Aschaffenburg (52 km) and Würzburg (32 km) on the edge of the Spessart (range). To Karlstadt am Main (the district seat) it is 15 km and to Lohr am Main the same. From the Autobahn A 3 (Frankfurt - Würzburg), Roden can be reached through the Marktheidenfeld interchange (no. 65), and thence to Marktheidenfeld and across the Main Bridge there. A left turn at the far end of the bridge brings drivers to Roden after 7 km.

The community is rich in woodland (roughly 1 000 ha) at the seam between the Spessart's mostly bunter-based geology and that found on the Fränkische Platte (a flat, mostly agricultural region), which is mostly Muschelkalk-based.

=== Constituent communities ===
The community is made up of the two centres of Roden and Ansbach.

== History ==
In 1348, Roden had its first documentary mention, and for centuries was part of the Prince-Bishopric of Würzburg. It passed with the 1803 Reichsdeputationshauptschluss to the Counts of Löwenstein-Wertheim-Rosenburg. In 1806, Roden became part of the mediatized Amt of Steinfeld, belonging to Baden, which in turn was ceded to Austria in 1816. In the Generalrezess of Frankfurt in 1819, Roden passed to Bavaria.

=== Coat of arms ===
The community's arms might be described thus: Per pale, dexter vert an oaktree eradicated argent, sinister Or an uncial N, in chief a cross pattée sable.

The oaktree on the dexter (armsbearer's right, viewer's left) side refers to the community's wealth of woodland, and on the sinister (armsbearer's left, viewer's right) side is the symbol used by the Neustadt am Main Monastery, which was the village's origin.

== Sightseeing ==
- St. Cyriacus's Parish Church from 1710 with a tower from Julius Echter's time (tabernacle from 16th century)
- Important Crucifixion Group made of sandstone from the former Neustadt am Main Monastery (1586) at the community's graveyard

== Clubs ==
- Cyriakusverein Roden, chairman, Roland Ehehalt
- Roden volunteer fire brigade, chief and commander, Roland Henlein
- Ansbach volunteer fire brigade, chief, Herold Andreas, commander, Peter Pfeufer
- FC Roden football club, chairman Erwin Eyrich
- Roden Gardening and Beautification Club, chairwoman Karin Steinbauer
- Ansbach Gardening and Beautification Club, chairwoman Ulrike Steinbauer
- Kameradenbund Ansbach, chairman Gerhard Behr
- Roden Music Club, chairman Horst Schmitt
- Schützenkameradschaft 1957 Roden (marksmanship, shooting), chairman Georg Benkert
- SJG Ansbach (sport and youth), chairwoman Uschi Sommer
- VdK Ortsverband Roden, chairman Helmut Schreck

== Economy ==
Small businesses and only a few countrymen offer hardly any jobs in the community. The overwhelming majority of the inhabitants commute to work in Lohr, Marktheidenfeld or Würzburg.
