= Glasbach (Main) =

River in Germany

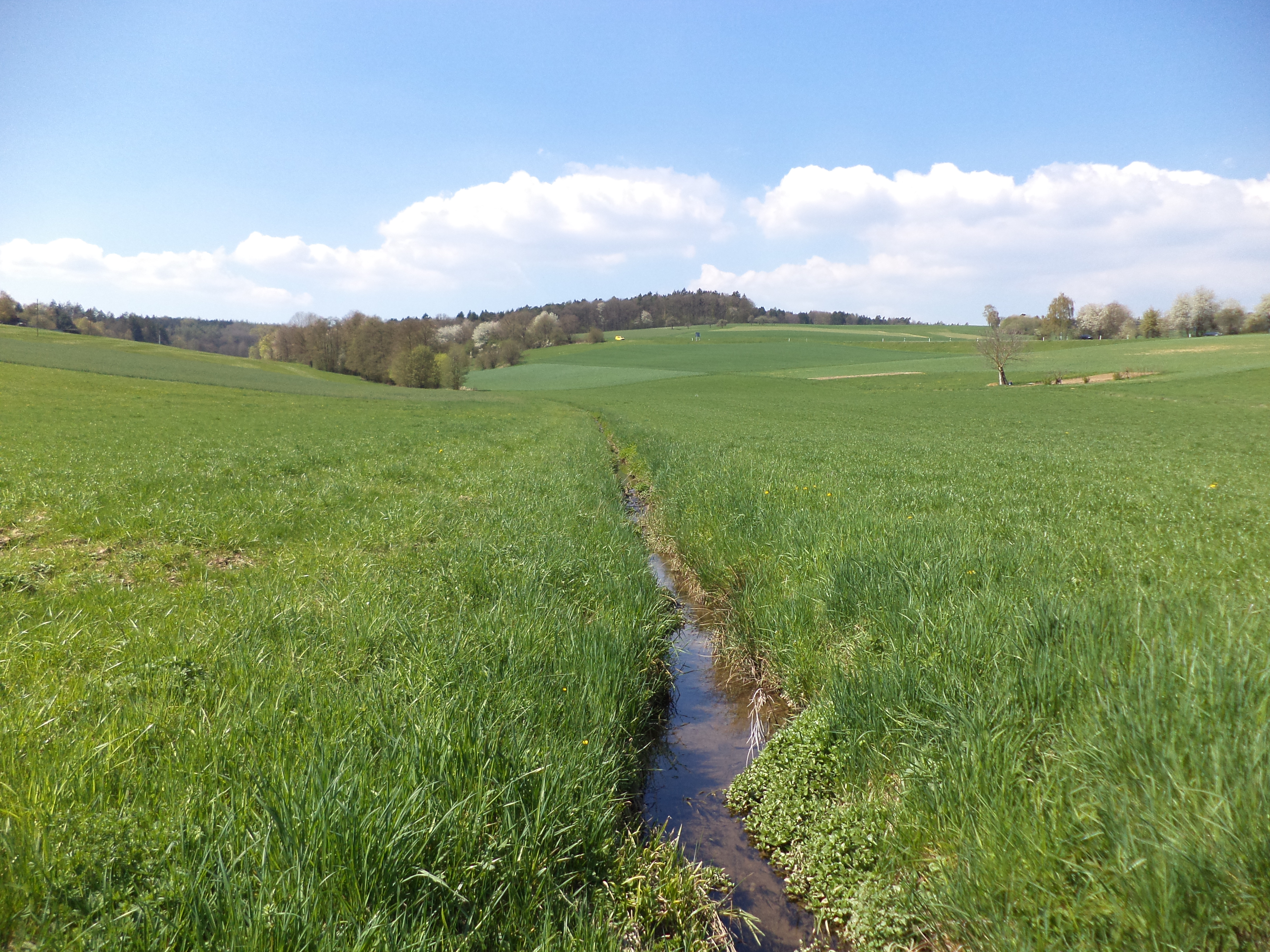
- The Glasbach near Glasofen

Location
- Country: Germany
- State: Bavaria

Physical characteristics
- Source
  - location: East of Esselbach, a district of Esselbach
  - coordinates: 49.8464°N 9.5481°E
- Mouth
  - location: opposite of Marktheidenfeld into the Main
  - coordinates: 49.8534°N 9.5971°E

Glasbach is a river of Bavaria, Germany. It is a right tributary of the Main.

== See also ==
- List of rivers of Bavaria
