= Die Neue Zeit TV =

German television channel

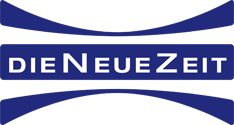
- Country: Germany

Ownership
- Owner: Vita Vera Verlags GMBH

History
- Launched: 31 July 2008; 17 years ago

Links
- Website: www.dieneuezeit.tv

Die Neue Zeit TV (The New Time), also known under its motto "Im Zeichen der Lilie im messianischen und sophianischen Zeitalter" (Under the Sign of the Lily in Messianic and Sophianic Ages), is a Swiss-registered German niche television channel related to the Universal Life new religious movement.

Legally, the channel's parent company (Vita Vera Verlags GMBH) is based in Bremgarten, near Bern, the Swiss capital and uses a Swiss domain name. Originally, Marktheidenfeld-based company Gabriele-Verlag Das Wort, which was directly related to Universal Life and Gabriele Wittek, was also involved.

== Programming ==
The line-up is dominated by religious programs, in which the UL teachings and ideology are disseminated, such as criticism of traditional churches. A vegan cooking show airs at noon; however, throughout the day, most of the programming is dominated by appearances of Wittek and from entities connected to UL. Other program types include praying, classical music and late night meditation. A 90-minute roundtable is broadcast during prime time. As of 2021, the channel still broadcast in the 4:3 aspect ratio.

A second channel (Die Neue Zeit TV 2) operated from 13 June to 28 June 2023. By then the main channel had upgraded to full HD while the new channel broadcast on 720p SD. It is unknown what led to its closure.

Since at least 2017, aside from productions that came because of the war in Ukraine, the channel has been reducing its amount of new productions, including repeats of old revelations by Gabriele Wittek and an increased number of debates. As revealed by the Main-Post in 2017, this owes largely to the fall in the number of Universal Life adherents.

== Literature ==
- Michael Hitziger: Weltuntergang bei Würzburg. Verlag Hans Schiler, Berlin 2008, ISBN 978-3-89930-227-1.
