= Universelles Leben e.V. v. Germany =

1996 ECHR legal case

Universelles Leben e.V. v. Germany (application No. 29745/96) was a case decided by the European Commission of Human Rights in 1996.

== Facts ==
Universelles Leben, the German branch of Universal Life, filed a request in German court for an interim injunction prohibiting the German Government from including a reference to the applicant association in a publication on "So-called youth sects and psycho-groups in the Federal Republic of Germany" until a final court's decision on prohibiting the reference. The interim injunction was granted by the Cologne Administrative Court.

After a government appeal of the injunction, the North Rhine-Westphalia Administrative Court of Appeal dismissed UL's request. It found that the documents produced by UL, in particular on the replacement of medical treatment by religious belief, showed a degree of danger for the general public justifying a reference to the applicant association in the envisaged publication including a warning about its activities.

== Decision ==
The commission considered that "a State ... is entitled to convey, in an objective, but critical manner, information on religious communities and sects, if such information does not pursue aims of agitation or indoctrination endangering the freedom of religion" and that "the reference to the applicant association in the intended publication does not have any direct repercussions on the religious freedom of the association or its members". Therefore it held that there was no interference with the applicant association's rights to freedom of religion under Article 9 of the European Convention on Human Rights.
