= Urspringen =

- Municipality
- Coat of arms

- Location of Urspringen within Main-Spessart district
- Interactive map of Urspringen
- Location within Germany Location within Bavaria
- Coordinates: 49°54′N 9°40′E
- Country: Germany
- State: Bavaria
- Admin. region: Unterfranken
- District: Main-Spessart
- Municipal assoc.: Marktheidenfeld

Government
  - Mayor (2020–26): Volker Hemrich

Area
  - Total: 17.99 km^{2} (6.95 sq mi)
- Elevation: 245–345 m (804–1,132 ft)

Population (2025-12-31)
  - Total: 1,399
  - Density: 77.77/km^{2} (201.4/sq mi)
- Time zone: UTC+01:00 (CET)
  - Summer (DST): UTC+02:00 (CEST)
- Postal codes: 97857
- Dialling codes: 09396
- Vehicle registration: MSP
- Website: www.urspringen.de

Urspringen is a municipality in the Main-Spessart district in the Regierungsbezirk of Lower Franconia (Unterfranken) in Bavaria, Germany and a member of the Verwaltungsgemeinschaft (Administrative Community) of Marktheidenfeld.

== Geography ==
=== Location ===
Urspringen lies in the Würzburg Region.

The community has only the Gemarkung (traditional rural cadastral area) of Urspringen.

== History ==
The former Amt of the County of Castell passed after mediatization in 1806 and border adjustments in 1810 to the Grand Duchy of Würzburg, with which it passed in 1814 to Bavaria. In the course of administrative reform in Bavaria, the current community came into being with the Gemeindeedikt (“Municipal Edict”) of 1818.

=== Population development ===
Within town limits, 1,168 inhabitants were counted in 1970, 1,160 in 1987 and in 2015 1,344.

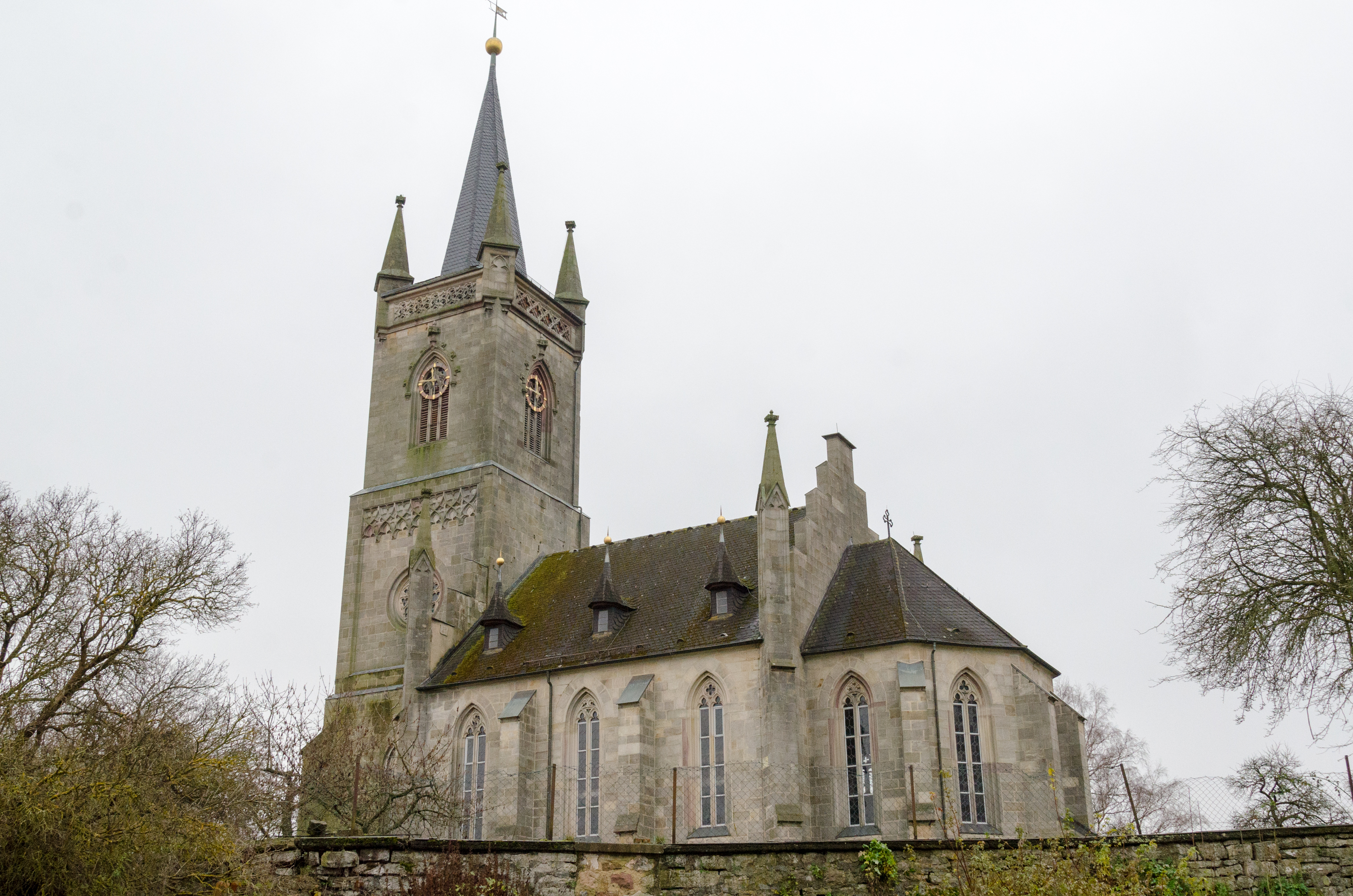
Urspringen, Protestant church

== Politics ==
Mayor: since 2014 Volker Hemrich.

Municipal taxes in 1999 amounted to €615,000 (converted), of which net business taxes amounted to €150,000.

=== Coat of arms ===
The community's arms might be described thus: Gules a pallet wavy argent, dexter a ram's attire of the same, sinister quarterly of the first and second.

The wavy pallet (narrow vertical stripe) is canting for the community's name as it represents a brook's source, or “origin” (Ursprung in German). About 1730, the Counts of Castell held the Vogtei over Urspringen with which the Voit von Rieneck family was enfeoffed. Recalling this are the quartering on the sinister (armsbearer's left, viewer's right) side, which was the arms borne by the Counts of Castell, and the ram's horn on the dexter (armsbearer's right, viewer's left) side from those borne by the Voit von Rieneck family.

The arms have been borne since 1970.

== Economy and infrastructure ==
According to official statistics, there were 50 workers on the social welfare contribution rolls working in producing businesses in 1998. In trade and transport this was 15. In other areas, 37 workers on the social welfare contribution rolls were employed, and 511 such workers worked from home. There were 5 processing businesses. Two businesses were in construction, and furthermore, in 1999, there were 32 agricultural operations with a working area of 1 090 ha, of which 1 060 ha was cropland and 28 ha was meadowland.

=== Education ===
In 1999 the following institutions existed in Urspringen:

- Kindergartens: 1 with 75 places and 53 children
- Primary schools: 1 with 10 teachers and 185 pupils
- Memorial and Documentation Site for the History of the Jews of the Main-Spessart District at the community's former synagogue, whose former function is recalled in a memorial plaque
