= Karbach, Bavaria =

Karbach
- Municipality
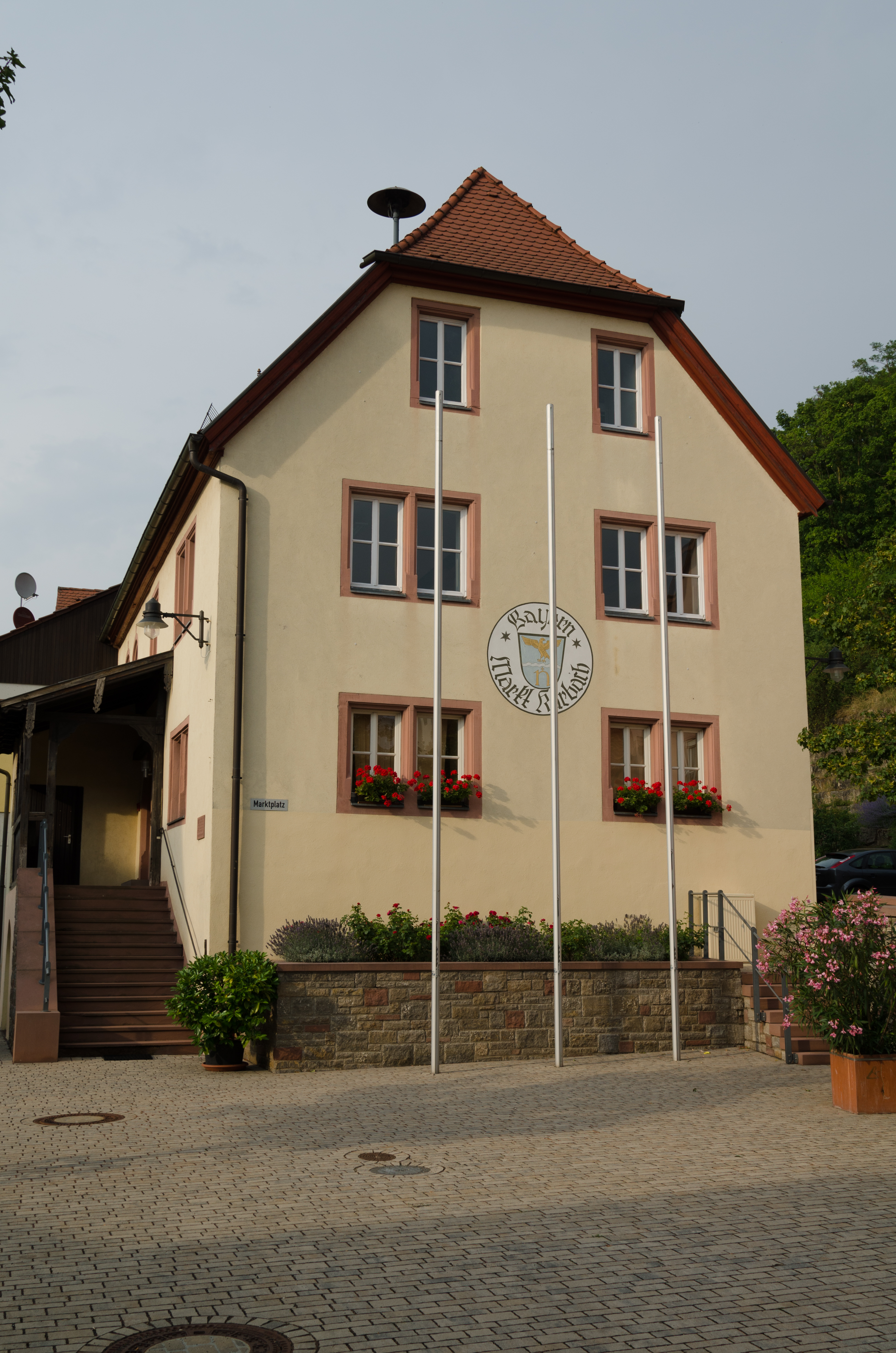
- Former synagogue in Karbach

- Coat of arms

- Location of Karbach within Main-Spessart district
- Interactive map of Karbach
- Location within Germany Location within Bavaria
- Coordinates: 49°52′N 9°38′E
- Country: Germany
- State: Bavaria
- Admin. region: Unterfranken
- District: Main-Spessart
- Municipal assoc.: Marktheidenfeld

Government
  - Mayor (2020–26): Bertram Werrlein (FW)

Area
  - Total: 24.14 km^{2} (9.32 sq mi)
- Elevation: 204 m (669 ft)

Population (2025-12-31)
  - Total: 1,472
  - Density: 60.98/km^{2} (157.9/sq mi)
- Time zone: UTC+01:00 (CET)
  - Summer (DST): UTC+02:00 (CEST)
- Postal codes: 97842
- Dialling codes: 09391
- Vehicle registration: MSP
- Website: www.karbach.de

Karbach (German: [ˈkaːɐ̯ˌbax]) is a market municipality in the Main-Spessart district in the Regierungsbezirk of Lower Franconia (Unterfranken) in Bavaria, Germany and a member of the Verwaltungsgemeinschaft (Administrative Community) of Marktheidenfeld.

== Geography ==
=== Location ===
Karbach lies in the Würzburg Region.

The community has only one Gemarkung (traditional rural cadastral area), also called Karbach.

== History ==
As part of the Prince-Bishopric of Würzburg, Karbach passed with the Reichsdeputationshauptschluss in 1803 to the Counts of Löwenstein-Wertheim. In 1806 it became part of the mediatized Amt of Steinfeld, which in 1816 was ceded to Austria. In the Generalrezess of Frankfurt in 1819, it passed to Bavaria.

=== Population development ===
Within town limits, 1,154 inhabitants were counted in 1970, 1,308 in 1987, in 2000 1,356 and in 2013 1,433.

== Politics ==
The mayor is Bertram Werrlein, in office since 2014.

Municipal taxes in 1999 amounted to €1,007,000 (converted), of which net business taxes amounted to €428,000.

=== Coat of arms ===
The community’s arms might be described thus: Azure a fess wavy argent, in chief an eagle reguardant wings overt Or, in base an uppercase uncial N on which a cross of the last.

== Culture and sightseeing ==
=== Jewish graveyard ===
Since 1983, a memorial stone here recalls the persecution and murder of Karbach’s, Homburg’s and Marktheidenfeld’s Jewish inhabitants, who fell victim to the Holocaust in National Socialist times.

== Economy and infrastructure ==
According to official statistics, there were 40 workers on the social welfare contribution rolls working in producing businesses in 1998. In trade and transport this was 28. In other areas, 26 workers on the social welfare contribution rolls were employed, and 571 such workers worked from home. Nobody was employed in processing businesses. Three businesses were in construction, and furthermore, in 1999, there were 19 agricultural operations with a working area of 1 249 ha, of which 1 149 ha was cropland and 98 ha was meadowland.

=== Education ===
In 1999 the following institutions existed in Karbach:

- Kindergartens: 50 place with 44 children
- Primary schools: 1 with 14 teachers and 252 pupils
