= Hafenlohr =

- Municipality
- Coat of arms

- Location of Hafenlohr within Main-Spessart district
- Interactive map of Hafenlohr
- Location within Germany Location within Bavaria
- Coordinates: 49°52′N 9°36′E
- Country: Germany
- State: Bavaria
- Admin. region: Unterfranken
- District: Main-Spessart
- Municipal assoc.: Marktheidenfeld

Government
  - Mayor (2020–26): Thorsten Schwab (CSU)

Area
  - Total: 11.33 km^{2} (4.37 sq mi)
- Elevation: 170 m (560 ft)

Population (2025-12-31)
  - Total: 1,759
  - Density: 155.3/km^{2} (402.1/sq mi)
- Time zone: UTC+01:00 (CET)
  - Summer (DST): UTC+02:00 (CEST)
- Postal codes: 97840
- Dialling codes: 09391
- Vehicle registration: MSP
- Website: www.hafenlohr.de

Hafenlohr is a municipality in the Main-Spessart district in the Regierungsbezirk of Lower Franconia (Unterfranken) in Bavaria, Germany and a member of the Verwaltungsgemeinschaft (Administrative Community) of Marktheidenfeld.

== Geography ==
=== Location ===
Hafenlohr lies in the Würzburg Region, roughly 3 km from Marktheidenfeld. It is located on the confluence of the rivers Hafenlohr and Main.

=== Subdivision ===
The community has the following Gemarkungen (traditional rural cadastral areas): Hafenlohr, Windheim, Fürstlich Löwenstein'scher Park.

== History ==
Hafenlohr was mentioned first in 1324 but its origins (and those of Windheim just to the northwest) probably go back to around the year 1000. It was a centre of the pottery industry. The area was property of the Kloster Neustadt since the late 8th century. From the mid-12th century it belonged to the Counts of Rieneck until their male line died out in 1333 and the property reverted to the Hochstift of the Bishop of Würzburg.

As part of the Oberamt of Rothenfels of the Prince-Bishopric of Würzburg, Hafenlohr passed at Secularization to the Counts of Löwenstein-Wertheim. By mediatization in 1806 it passed to the Principality of Aschaffenburg, with which it passed in 1814 to Bavaria. In the course of administrative reform in Bavaria, the current community came into being with the Gemeindeedikt ("Municipal Edict") of 1818.

== Demographics ==
Within town limits, 1,804 inhabitants were counted in 1970, 1,721 in 1987 and in 2000 1,877.

== Governance ==
The mayor is Thorsten Schwab (CSU), reelected in 2014 with 87% of the vote.

=== Coat of arms ===
The community's arms might be described thus: Gules edged Or a fess wavy argent at the nombril point, above which a jug of the second.

== Economy ==
According to official statistics, there were 260 workers on the social welfare contribution rolls working in producing businesses in 1998, and in trade and transport this was 0. In other areas, 37 workers on the social welfare contribution rolls were employed, and 687 such workers worked from home. There were 17 processing businesses. No businesses were in construction, and furthermore, in 1999, there were 15 agricultural operations with a working area of 103 ha, of which 47 ha was cropland and 55 ha was meadowland.

Municipal taxes in 1999 amounted to €952,000 (converted from DM), of which net business taxes amounted to €126,000.

== Education ==
In 1999 the following institutions existed in Hafenlohr:

- Kindergartens: 73 places with 65 children
- Primary schools: 1 with 12 teachers and 184 pupils

== Infrastructure ==
=== Public institutions ===
- Technisches Hilfswerk, Marktheidenfeld chapter
- Hafenlohr volunteer fire brigade
- Windheim volunteer fire brigade

== Twin towns – sister cities ==
Hafenlohr is twinned with:

- Pont-d'Ouilly, France
