= Karbach (Main) =

River in Germany

- the Karbach shortly after the inflow of the Grummibach

Location
- Country: Germany
- State: Bavaria

Physical characteristics
- Mouth
  - location: Main
  - coordinates: 49.8854°N 9.5986°E
- Length: 15.8 km (9.8 mi)

Basin features
- Progression: Main→ Rhine→ North Sea

Karbach (German: [ˈkaːɐ̯ˌbax]) is a river of Bavaria, Germany. It is a left tributary of the Main near Marktheidenfeld.

== See also ==
- List of rivers of Bavaria
