= Birkenfeld, Bavaria =

Birkenfeld
- Municipality
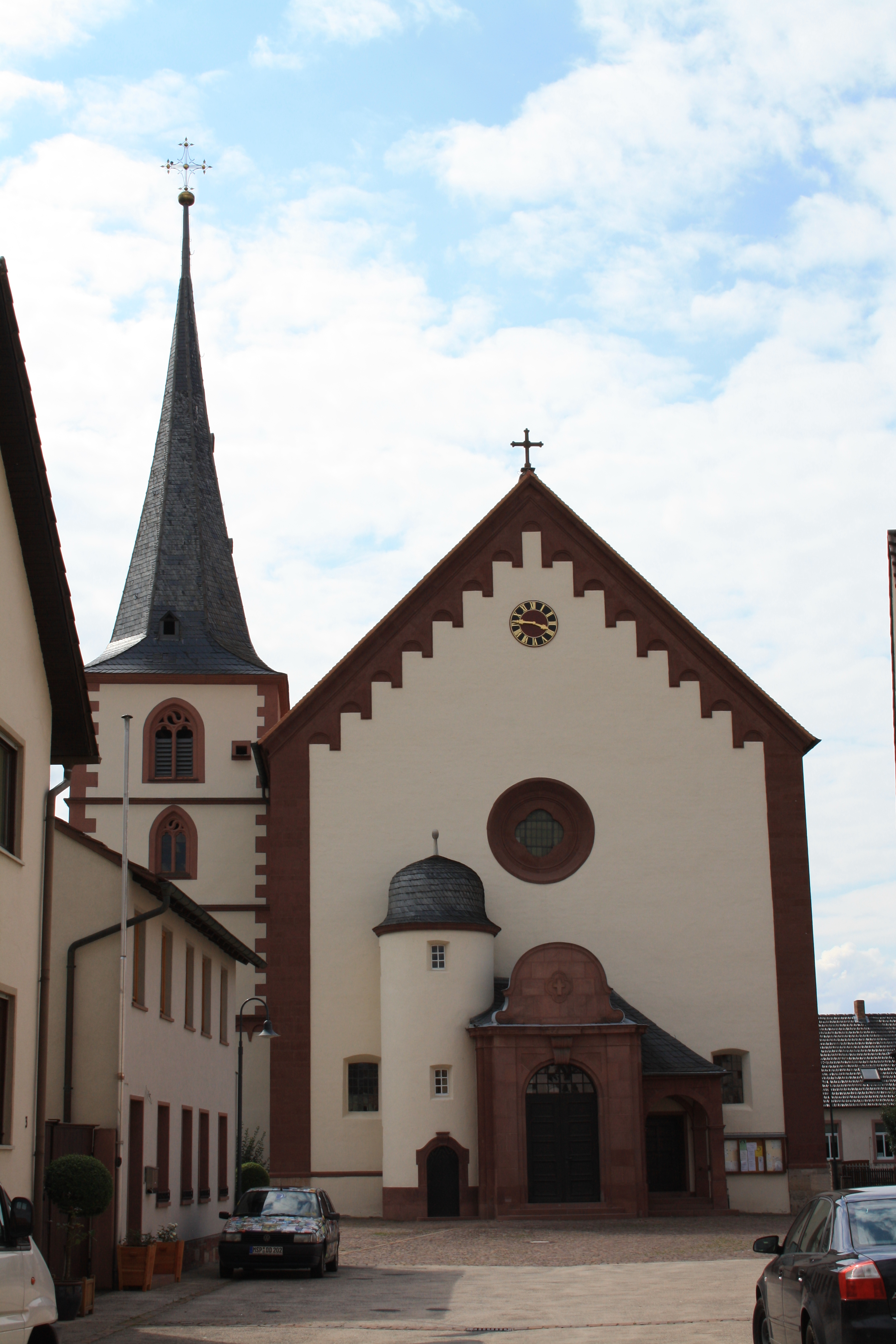
- Church of Saint Valentine

- Coat of arms

- Location of Birkenfeld within Main-Spessart district
- Interactive map of Birkenfeld
- Location within Germany Location within Bavaria
- Coordinates: 49°52′N 9°42′E
- Country: Germany
- State: Bavaria
- Admin. region: Unterfranken
- District: Main-Spessart
- Municipal assoc.: Marktheidenfeld

Government
  - Mayor (2020–26): Achim Müller (FW)

Area
  - Total: 29.15 km^{2} (11.25 sq mi)
- Elevation: 206 m (676 ft)

Population (2025-12-31)
  - Total: 2,117
  - Density: 72.62/km^{2} (188.1/sq mi)
- Time zone: UTC+01:00 (CET)
  - Summer (DST): UTC+02:00 (CEST)
- Postal codes: 97834
- Dialling codes: 09398
- Vehicle registration: MSP
- Website: www.gemeinde-birkenfeld.de

Birkenfeld (German pronunciation: [ˈbɪʁkn̩fɛlt]) is a municipality in the Main-Spessart district in the Regierungsbezirk of Lower Franconia (Unterfranken) in Bavaria, Germany and a member of the Verwaltungsgemeinschaft (Administrative community) of Marktheidenfeld.

== Geography ==
=== Location ===
Birkenfeld lies in the Main Spessart Region.

The municipality has the following Gemarkungen (traditional rural cadastral areas): Billingshausen, Birkenfeld.

== History ==
As part of the Prince-Bishopric of Würzburg, Birkenfeld passed with the Reichsdeputationshauptschluss in 1803 to the Counts of Löwenstein-Wertheim. In 1806 it became part of the mediatized Amt of Steinfeld, which in 1816 was ceded to Austria. In the Generalrezess of Frankfurt in 1819, it passed to Bavaria.

=== Population development ===
Within town limits, 1,862 inhabitants were counted in 1970, 1,936 in 1987 and in 2000 2,127. Billingshausen has about 400 inhabitants.

== Politics ==
The mayor is Achim Müller, in office since 2014 and re-elected in 2020.

Municipal taxes in 1999 amounted to €924,000 (converted), of which net business taxes amounted to €141,000.

== Economy and infrastructure ==
According to official statistics, there were 4 workers on the social welfare contribution rolls working in agriculture and forestry in 1998. In producing businesses this was 111, and in trade and transport 27. In other areas, 69 workers on the social welfare contribution rolls were employed, and 867 such workers worked from home. There were 5 processing businesses. Five businesses were in construction, and furthermore, in 1999, there were 46 agricultural operations with a working area of 2 374 ha, of which 2 231 ha was cropland and 140 ha was meadowland.

=== Education ===
In 1999 the following institutions existed in Birkenfeld:

- Kindergartens: 100 places with 84 children

== Famous people ==
=== Sons and daughters of the town ===
- Alfons Klühspies, painter (b. 1899 in Birkenfeld; d. 1975 in Würzburg)
