= Main-Spessart =

Coordinates: 49°55′N 9°45′E

- District
- Flag Coat of arms
- Country: Germany
- State: Bavaria
- Adm. region: Lower Franconia
- Capital: Karlstadt

Government
  - District admin.: Sabine Sitter (CSU)

Area
  - Total: 1,322 km^{2} (510 sq mi)

Population (31 December 2025)
  - Total: 124,315
  - Density: 94.04/km^{2} (243.6/sq mi)
- Time zone: UTC+01:00 (CET)
  - Summer (DST): UTC+02:00 (CEST)
- Vehicle registration: MSP
- Website: http://www.main-spessart.de

Main-Spessart is a Landkreis (district) in the northwest of Bavaria, Germany. It is located in Lower Franconia and derives its name from the river Main and the wooded hills of the Spessart.

== Geography ==
The district is bounded by (from the north and clockwise) the districts of Bad Kissingen, Schweinfurt and Würzburg, the state of Baden-Württemberg (district of Main-Tauber), the districts of Miltenberg and Aschaffenburg, and the state of Hesse (district of Main-Kinzig).

The river Main forms a large horse-shoe bend in the district, entering in the southeast near Thüngersheim and leaving to the southwest near Hasloch. In the north it is joined by the Franconian Saale river at Gemünden. The Spessart hills cover most of the area of the district west and north of the Main. To the northeast, the district borders on the Rhön hills.

== History ==
The district was established in 1972 by merging the former districts of Gemünden, Karlstadt, Lohr and Marktheidenfeld. Although Lohr is the largest town, the seat of the administration is located in Karlstadt.

== Politics ==
- Main-Spessart (electoral district)

== Economy ==
In 2017 (latest data available) the GDP per inhabitant was €36,264. This places the district 44th out of 96 districts (rural and urban) in Bavaria (overall average: €46,698).

== Coat of arms ==
The coat of arms displays:

- a wheel symbolising the clerical state of Mainz
- the arms of the bishopric of Würzburg
- an oak leaf representing the forests of the area
- a bunch of grapes symbolising viticulture
- a wavy line representing the river Main

== Towns and municipalities ==
Clickable map of towns and municipalities in the district

Towns
1. Arnstein
2. Gemünden am Main
3. Karlstadt
4. Lohr am Main
5. Marktheidenfeld
6. Rieneck
Märkte
1. Frammersbach
2. Triefenstein
Municipalities
1. Eußenheim

Verwaltungsgemeinschaften
| 1. Burgsinn; 1. Aura im Sinngrund; 2. Burgsinn^{1,3}; 3. Fellen; 4. Mittelsinn; 5. Obersinn^{3}; 2. Gemünden am Main; 1. Gössenheim; 2. Gräfendorf; 3. Karsbach | 3. Kreuzwertheim; 1. Hasloch; 2. Kreuzwertheim^{1,3}; 3. Schollbrunn; 4. Lohr am Main; 1. Neuendorf; 2. Neustadt am Main; 3. Rechtenbach; 4. Steinfeld | 5. Marktheidenfeld; 1. Birkenfeld; 2. Bischbrunn; 3. Erlenbach bei Marktheidenfeld; 4. Esselbach; 5. Hafenlohr; 6. Karbach^{3}; 7. Roden; 8. Rothenfels^{2}; 9. Urspringen | 6. Partenstein; 1. Neuhütten; 2. Partenstein^{1,3}; 3. Wiesthal; 7. Zellingen; 1. Himmelstadt; 2. Retzstadt; 3. Thüngen^{3}; 4. Zellingen^{1,3} |
^{1}seat of the Verwaltungsgemeinschaft; ^{2}town; ^{3}Markt
