= Erlenbach bei Marktheidenfeld =

Erlenbach b.Marktheidenfeld
- Municipality
- Coat of arms

- Location of Erlenbach b.Marktheidenfeld within Main-Spessart district
- Interactive map of Erlenbach b.Marktheidenfeld
- Location within Germany Location within Bavaria
- Coordinates: 49°49′N 9°38′E
- Country: Germany
- State: Bavaria
- Admin. region: Unterfranken
- District: Main-Spessart
- Municipal assoc.: Marktheidenfeld
- Subdivisions: 2 Ortsteile

Government
  - Mayor (2020–26): Georg Neubauer

Area
  - Total: 15.33 km^{2} (5.92 sq mi)
- Elevation: 208 m (682 ft)

Population (2025-12-31)
  - Total: 2,387
  - Density: 155.7/km^{2} (403.3/sq mi)
- Time zone: UTC+01:00 (CET)
  - Summer (DST): UTC+02:00 (CEST)
- Postal codes: 97837
- Dialling codes: 09391
- Vehicle registration: MSP
- Website: www.gemeinde-erlenbach.de

Erlenbach bei Marktheidenfeld (officially Erlenbach b.Marktheidenfeld) is a municipality in the Main-Spessart district in the Regierungsbezirk of Lower Franconia (Unterfranken) in Bavaria, Germany and a member of the Verwaltungsgemeinschaft (Administrative Community) of Marktheidenfeld. It has given itself the title Weinort mit Herz – Wine Town with Heart.

== Geography ==
=== Location ===
The community lies on Bundesstraße 8 between Würzburg and Aschaffenburg.

=== Constituent communities ===
Besides Erlenbach itself, the outlying centre of Tiefenthal also belongs to the community.

== History ==
As part of the Prince-Bishopric (Hochstift) of Würzburg, Erlenbach was in Bavaria's favour secularized in 1803 and passed under the Peace of Pressburg (1805) to Archduke Ferdinand of Tuscany to form the Grand Duchy of Würzburg, whence it passed back to Bavaria in 1814. In the course of administrative reform in Bavaria, the current community came into being with the Gemeindeedikt (“Municipal Edict”) of 1818.

=== Population development ===
Within town limits, 1,875 inhabitants were counted in 1970, 2,074 in 1987 and in 2000 2,347.

== Politics ==
The mayor is Georg Neubauer (FWG-SPD).

Municipal taxes in 1999 amounted to €1,078,000 (converted), of which net business taxes amounted to €132,000.

=== Community council ===
Seat apportionment after municipal election in 2008:

- CSU: 5
- FWG-SPD: 6
- Bürgergemeinschaft Tiefenthal: 3

=== Coat of arms ===
The community's arms might be described thus: Gules two arrows in saltire the dexters sable and the sinisters Or surmounted by a heart argent, itself surmounted by a bunch of grapes azure, the stalk of the second, the whole between two mullets of six of the third.

The arms are based on the village's 18th-century seal, which bore the same charges seen today in the arms, likewise marshalled. The grapes stand for the community's wine-growing, and the heart may refer to the love of community. The arrows stand for the defence of the village, and the six-pointed stars come from the Wertheim family's roses. The tinctures come from the arms borne by the Princely Electorate (Hochstift) of Würzburg, to which Erlenbach belonged from 1612 to 1803.

== Culture and sightseeing ==
- There is a woodland adventure path.
- Events: Weinwandertag (“Wine Hiking Day”) yearly in May on Ascension Day (Sport Club), Wine Festival yearly in June (Wine-growing Club), May Forest Festival, Prunk- und Fremdenfaschingssitzung as well as many other events by various local clubs during Fasching (Carnival), Lens Grinders’ Street Festival, Music and Singing Club's Street Festival (Corpus Christi), Erlenbach Fire Brigade's Strong Beer Festival, and more.

=== Museums ===
- In the Town Hall yard is a village museum.

=== Buildings ===
Saint Burkhard's Parish Church was built by Julius Echter in 1613.

== Famous people ==
=== Sons and daughters of the town ===
- Hans Martin (b. 26 January 1916; d. 27 November 2007 in Würzburg), composer, choir leader, organist and teacher
