= Esselbach =

- Municipality
- Coat of arms

- Location of Esselbach within Main-Spessart district
- Interactive map of Esselbach
- Location within Germany Location within Bavaria
- Coordinates: 49°51′N 09°32′E
- Country: Germany
- State: Bavaria
- Admin. region: Unterfranken
- District: Main-Spessart
- Municipal assoc.: Marktheidenfeld

Government
  - Mayor (2020–26): Richard Roos (CSU)

Area
  - Total: 10.33 km^{2} (3.99 sq mi)
- Elevation: 300 m (980 ft)

Population (2025-12-31)
  - Total: 2,070
  - Density: 200/km^{2} (519/sq mi)
- Time zone: UTC+01:00 (CET)
  - Summer (DST): UTC+02:00 (CEST)
- Postal codes: 97839
- Dialling codes: 09394
- Vehicle registration: MSP
- Website: www.esselbach-online.de

Esselbach is a municipality in the Main-Spessart district in the Regierungsbezirk of Lower Franconia (Unterfranken) in Bavaria, Germany and a member of the Verwaltungsgemeinschaft (Administrative Community) of Marktheidenfeld.

== Geography ==
=== Location ===
The community is made up of the main centre of Esselbach as well as the outlying centres of Kredenbach and Steinmark. Belonging to Esselbach are the homesteads of Schleifthor, Alte Wachenmühle, Neue Wachenmühle, Faun and Karlshöhe. To Steinmark belong the Kieseckersmühle and the Heinrichsmühle. Schleifthor, Faun and Karlshöhe are part of the Löwensteiner Park, an otherwise unincorporated area.

== History ==
As part of the Prince-Bishopric of Würzburg, the main centre of Esselbach and also Steinmark and Kredenbach as parts of the County of Wertheim passed after the Reichsdeputationshauptschluss in 1803 to the newly formed Principality of Aschaffenburg, with which it passed in 1814 (by this time it had become a department of the Grand Duchy of Frankfurt) to Bavaria. In the course of administrative reform in Bavaria, three communities came into being with the Gemeindeedikt (“Municipal Edict”) of 1818. In the course of later municipal reform in Bavaria, the three communities, Esselbach, Steinmark and Kredenbach, were amalgamated into one, called Esselbach.

=== Population development ===
Within town limits, 1,627 inhabitants were counted in 1970, 1,747 in 1987 and in 2000 is 2,041. In 2008, the population figure was the same as the year – 2,008, and in 2019, the population was 2,096.

== Politics ==
The mayor is Richard Roos (Christlich Soziale Union), has been in office since 2013.

The 14 councilors have been broken down by faction since the municipal election held in 2008: - CSU-Bürgerblock: 5 - Freie Wähler: 4 - Bürgerliste/SPD: 3 - Bürgergemeinschaft: 2

=== Town partnerships ===
- Stetteldorf am Wagram, Lower Austria, Austria

=== Coat of arms ===
The community’s arms might be described thus: Vert a bend sinister argent surmounted by a post horn azure.

== Economy and infrastructure ==
=== Education ===
As of 2006, the following institutions existed in Esselbach:

- A Catholic kindergarten with three groups
- A Universal Life private school going up to the 10th year
- A public primary school with three classes as part of the Bischbrunn Collective School (Verbandschule Bischbrunn).
