= Bischbrunn =

- Municipality
- Coat of arms

- Location of Bischbrunn within Main-Spessart district
- Interactive map of Bischbrunn
- Location within Germany Location within Bavaria
- Coordinates: 49°52′13″N 09°29′21″E
- Country: Germany
- State: Bavaria
- Admin. region: Unterfranken
- District: Main-Spessart
- Municipal assoc.: Marktheidenfeld

Government
  - Mayor (2020–26): Agnes Engelhardt

Area
  - Total: 36.18 km^{2} (13.97 sq mi)
- Elevation: 395 m (1,296 ft)

Population (2025-12-31)
  - Total: 1,808
  - Density: 49.97/km^{2} (129.4/sq mi)
- Time zone: UTC+01:00 (CET)
  - Summer (DST): UTC+02:00 (CEST)
- Postal codes: 97836, 97852 (Schleifmühle)
- Dialling codes: 09394
- Vehicle registration: MSP
- Website: www.bischbrunn.de

Bischbrunn is a municipality with around 1,800 (2013) inhabitants in the Main-Spessart district in the Regierungsbezirk of Lower Franconia (Unterfranken) in Bavaria, Germany and a member of the Verwaltungsgemeinschaft (Administrative Community) of Marktheidenfeld.

== Geography ==
=== Location ===
Bischbrunn lies in the Main-Spessart district, in the Würzburg Region. It is located in the Spessart range of hills. The Geiersberg, the highest elevation in the Spessart is located in the municipal territory.

The community has the following Gemarkungen (traditional rural cadastral areas): Bischbrunn, Bischbrunner Forst, Fürstlich Löwenstein'scher Park, Oberndorf.

== History ==
As part of the Prince-Bishopric of Würzburg, Bischbrunn passed with the Reichsdeputationshauptschluss in 1803 to the newly formed Principality of Aschaffenburg, with which it passed in 1814 to the Kingdom of Bavaria. In the course of administrative reform in Bavaria, the current community came into being with the Gemeindeedikt ("Municipal Edict") of 1818.

== Demographics ==
Within town limits, 1,855 inhabitants were counted in 1970, 1,723 in 1987 and in 2000 1,917.

== Economy ==
Municipal taxes in 1999 amounted to €704,000 (converted), of which net business taxes amounted to €81,000.

According to official statistics, there were 67 workers on the social welfare contribution rolls working in producing businesses in 1998. In trade and transport this was 0, and 735 such workers worked from home. Nobody was employed in processing businesses. Six businesses were in construction, and furthermore, in 1999, there were 26 agricultural operations with a working area of 204 ha, of which 99 ha was cropland and 104 ha was meadowland.

== Government ==
Administratively, Bischbrunn is part of the Main-Spessart district (seat at Karlstadt) in the Regierungsbezirk of Lower Franconia (seat at Würzburg) and a member of the Verwaltungsgemeinschaft (Administrative Community) of Marktheidenfeld.

The mayor of Bischbrunn is Agnes Engelhardt (Bürgerliste), in office since 2016.

=== Coat of arms ===
The community's arms might be described thus: Per pale, dexter argent a sprig of oak in bend with three leaves vert acorned of three Or, sinister a well of the first masoned sable over which a pail of the third hanging on a chain of the last, itself hanging from the peak of a pointed, outwards bowed frame of the first astride and on the well with a fleur-de-lis on the peak.

== Infrastructure ==
=== Transport ===
The Bundesautobahn 3 passes through the territory of Bischbrunn. The closest interchanges are at Rohrbrunn and Marktheidenfeld.

=== Other ===
A large broadcasting facility is located on the Geiersberg.

== Education ==
In 1999 the following institutions existed in Bischbrunn:

- Kindergartens: 100 places with 81 children
- Primary schools: 1 with 31 teachers and 444 pupils
