= Gössenheim =

- Municipality
- Coat of arms

- Location of Gössenheim within Main-Spessart district
- Interactive map of Gössenheim
- Location within Germany Location within Bavaria
- Coordinates: 50°1′N 9°47′E
- Country: Germany
- State: Bavaria
- Admin. region: Unterfranken
- District: Main-Spessart
- Municipal assoc.: Gemünden am Main

Government
  - Mayor (2018–24): Klaus Schäfer

Area
  - Total: 11.50 km^{2} (4.44 sq mi)
- Elevation: 160–289 m (525–948 ft)

Population (2025-12-31)
  - Total: 1,097
  - Density: 95.39/km^{2} (247.1/sq mi)
- Time zone: UTC+01:00 (CET)
  - Summer (DST): UTC+02:00 (CEST)
- Postal codes: 97780
- Dialling codes: 09358
- Vehicle registration: MSP
- Website: www.goessenheim.de

Gössenheim is a municipality in the Main-Spessart district in the Regierungsbezirk of Lower Franconia (Unterfranken) in Bavaria, Germany and a member of the Verwaltungsgemeinschaft (Administrative Community) of Gemünden am Main.

== Geography ==
=== Location ===
Gössenheim lies on the river Wern in the Würzburg Region.

=== Constituent communities ===
Gössenheim’s Ortsteile are Gössenheim and Sachsenheim.

== History ==
Already by the early 7th century, the Main-Wern area was under the Merovingian Empire’s yoke and Frankish settlers had established themselves here in great numbers. Thus arose in the Wern valley a mixed population of Alamannic, Thuringian, Warnian and Frankish.

Historically, Gössenheim had its first documentary mention in 788. On 18 January that year, Count Manto and his brother Megingoz donated their holdings in Veringewe (Werngau), Heselere (Heßlar), Tüngide (Thüngen), Binzufeld (Binsfeld), Haholtesheim (Halsheim), Steti (Stetten), Büthult (Büchold) and Gysenheim (Gössenheim) to the Fulda Abbey. Already by Charlemagne’s time Gössenheim must have been a kingly estate and not at all an unimportant place.

The Homburg (actually “Hohenberg” – High Mountain – a castle) was built in the early 1170s by the Lords of Hohenberg, who were Würzburg ministeriales. Through inheritance it passed to the Bickenbach family in 1381. In 1469, the community along with the Homburg and the surrounding places was sold to the Prince-Bishopric of Würzburg.

Gössenheim was until about 1870 a fortified village whose core was shielded to the east, north and west by a ringwall, some of which still stands today. Gössenheim now lies on Bundesstraße 27 between Karlstadt and Hammelburg, and it belongs to the local area of the lesser centre of Gemünden in the Würzburg Region.

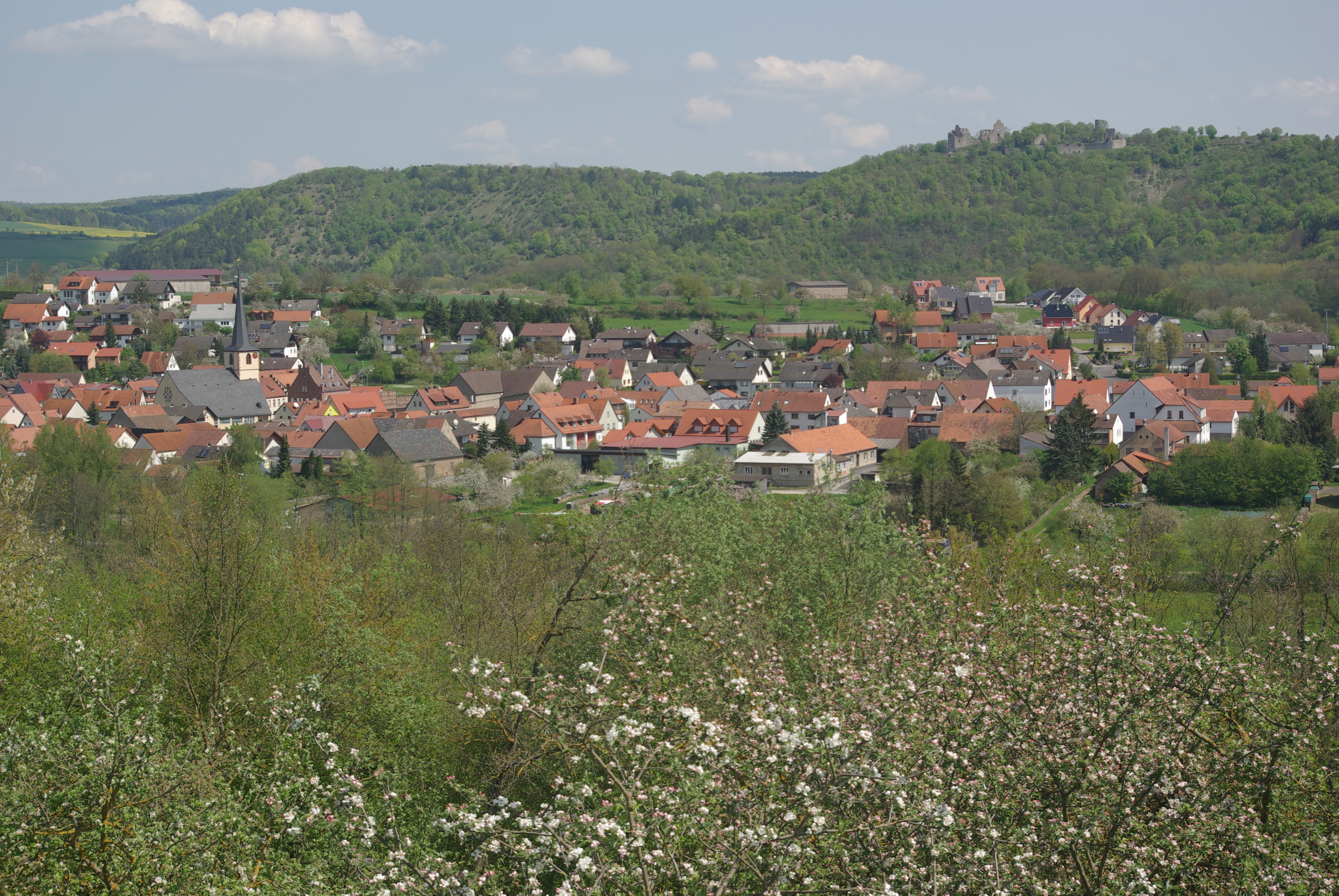
View of the village from the west (in the background the Homburg ruins)

=== Population development ===
Within town limits, 1,070 inhabitants were counted in 1970, 1,167 in 1987, 1,272 in 2000 and in 2006 1,357.

== Politics ==
The latest mayors were:

- 2018–incumbent: Klaus Schäfer
- 2008–2018: Theo Gärtner
- 2002–2008: Johann Popp

Municipal taxes in 1999 amounted to €615,000 (converted), of which net business taxes amounted to €186,000.

Gössenheim forms together with Karsbach and Gräfendorf the Verwaltungsgemeinschaft Gemünden which provides communal services to its citizens.

=== Coat of arms ===
The community’s arms might be described thus: Per fess in chief argent three lozenges gules in fess, below which dancetty of three of the second and first and a plain point azure.

== Economy and infrastructure ==
According to official statistics, there were 269 workers on the social welfare contribution rolls working in producing businesses in 1998. In trade and transport this was 28. In other areas, 46 workers on the social welfare contribution rolls were employed, and 416 such workers worked from home. There was one processing business. Five businesses were in construction, and furthermore, in 1999, there were 23 agricultural operations with a working area of 281 ha, of which 239 ha was cropland and 33 ha was meadowland.

=== Education ===
As of 1999 the following institutions existed in Gössenheim:

- Kindergartens: 74 places with 53 children
- Primary school: 10 teachers and 157 pupils
