= Karsbach =

- Municipality
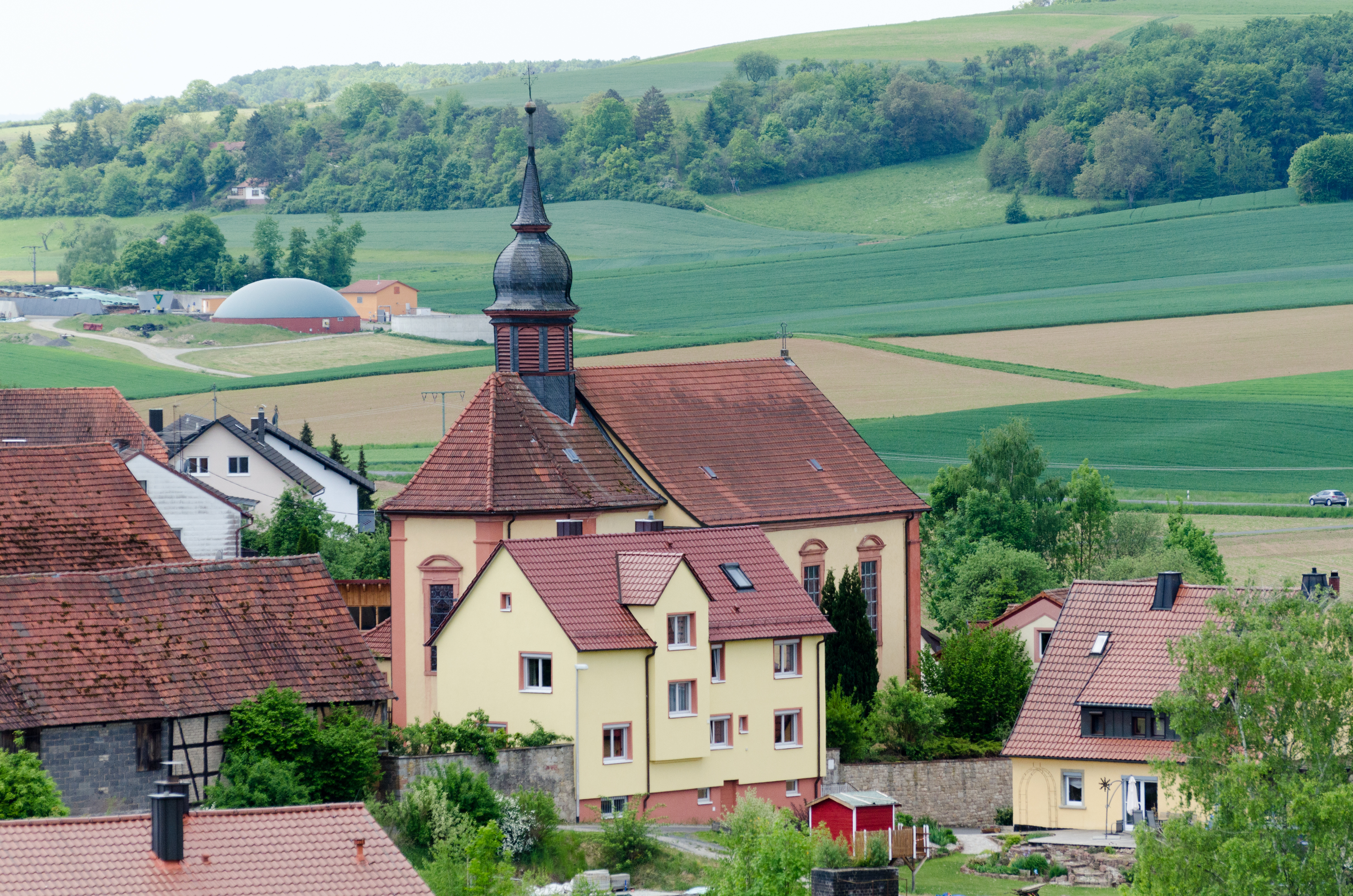
- Lutheran church in Höllrich

- Coat of arms

- Location of Karsbach within Main-Spessart district
- Interactive map of Karsbach
- Location within Germany Location within Bavaria
- Coordinates: 50°3′N 9°47′E
- Country: Germany
- State: Bavaria
- Admin. region: Unterfranken
- District: Main-Spessart
- Municipal assoc.: Gemünden am Main

Government
  - Mayor (2020–26): Martin Göbel

Area
  - Total: 30.15 km^{2} (11.64 sq mi)
- Elevation: 218 m (715 ft)

Population (2025-12-31)
  - Total: 1,677
  - Density: 55.62/km^{2} (144.1/sq mi)
- Time zone: UTC+01:00 (CET)
  - Summer (DST): UTC+02:00 (CEST)
- Postal codes: 97783
- Dialling codes: 09351
- Vehicle registration: MSP
- Website: www.karsbach.de

Karsbach is a municipality in the Main-Spessart district in the Regierungsbezirk of Lower Franconia (Unterfranken) in Bavaria, Germany and a member of the Verwaltungsgemeinschaft (Administrative Community) of Gemünden am Main.

== Geography ==
=== Location ===
Karsbach lies in the Würzburg Region.

The community has the following Ortsteile and Gemarkungen (traditional rural cadastral areas): Heßdorf, Höllrich, Karsbach, Weyersfeld.

== History ==
In the course of Secularization in 1803, the rights of the Prince-Bishopric of Würzburg in the community, and those held by the Juliusspital, passed to Bavaria, which under the terms of the Peace of Pressburg in 1805 it ceded to the newly formed Grand Duchy of Würzburg. In 1814 the community passed along with this back to Bavaria in 1814. In the course of administrative reform in Bavaria, the current community came into being with the Gemeindeedikt (“Municipal Edict”) of 1818.

The Jewish families living in the outlying centre of Heßdorf built their synagogue at Fußgasse 6, but it was destroyed on Kristallnacht (9 November 1938). A plaque at the community chancellery at Höllriederstraße and Brunnengasse recalls this event.

In 1978, the formerly self-administering communities of Weyersfeld, Höllrich and Heßdorf were amalgamated with Karsbach.

In 2005, Weyersfeld was chosen as Main-Spessart’s loveliest village in the contest Unser Dorf soll schöner werden – Unser Dorf hat Zukunft (“Our Village Should Become Lovelier – Our Village Has a Future”)

=== Population development ===
Within town limits, 1,526 inhabitants were counted in 1970, 1,507 in 1987, 1,788 in 2000 and in 2005 1,940.

== Politics ==
The mayor is Martin Göbel (Freie Bürger), in office since 1996.

Municipal taxes in 1999 amounted to €675,000 (converted), of which net business taxes amounted to €182,000.

== Economy and infrastructure ==
According to official statistics, there were 44 workers on the social welfare contribution rolls working in producing businesses in 1998. In trade and transport this was 0. In other areas, 16 workers on the social welfare contribution rolls were employed, and 584 such workers worked from home. There were three processing businesses. Two businesses were in construction, and furthermore, in 1999, there were 66 agricultural operations with a working area of 1 774 ha, of which 1 626 ha was cropland and 142 ha was meadowland.

=== Education ===
In 1999 the following institutions existed in Karsbach:

- Kindergartens: 75 places with 70 children
