= Gemünden am Main (Verwaltungsgemeinschaft) =

- Verwaltungsgemeinschaft
- Location of Gemünden am Main within Main-Spessart district
- Interactive map of Gemünden am Main
- Location within Germany Location within Bavaria
- Coordinates: 50°03′N 9°42′E
- Country: Germany
- State: Bavaria
- Admin. region: Lower Franconia
- District: Main-Spessart
- Seat: Gemünden am Main
- Subdivisions: 3 municipalities

Area
  - Total: 86.96 km^{2} (33.58 sq mi)

Population (2025-12-31)
  - Total: 4,057
  - Density: 46.65/km^{2} (120.8/sq mi)
- Time zone: UTC+01:00 (CET)
  - Summer (DST): UTC+02:00 (CEST)

Gemünden am Main is a Verwaltungsgemeinschaft (municipal association) in the district Main-Spessart in Bavaria, Germany. Its seat is in Gemünden am Main, itself not part of the Verwaltungsgemeinschaft.

It consists of the following municipalities:

1. Gössenheim
2. Gräfendorf
3. Karsbach
