= Universal Life =

German new religious movement

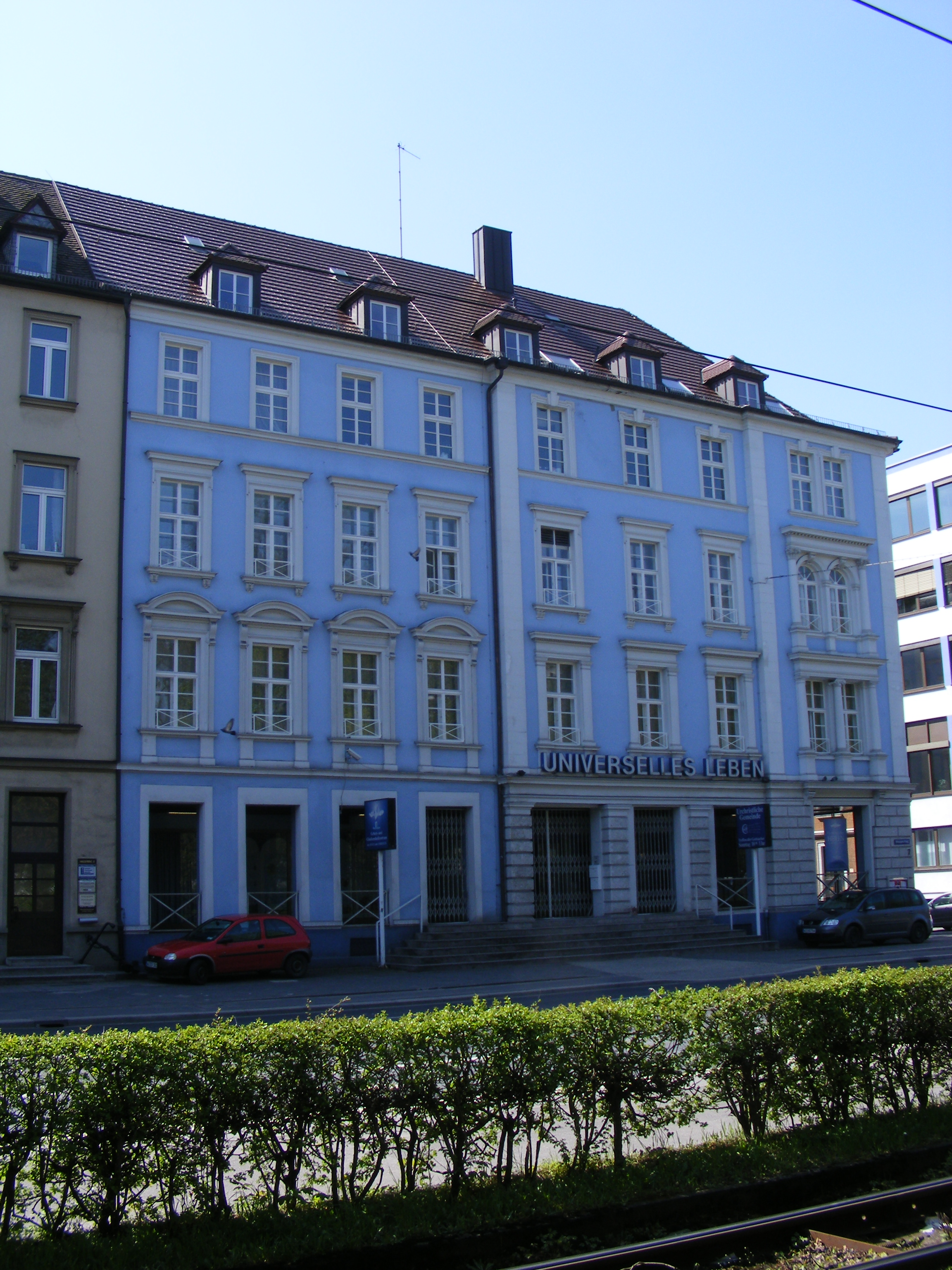
HQ of Universelles Leben in Würzburg, Bavaria

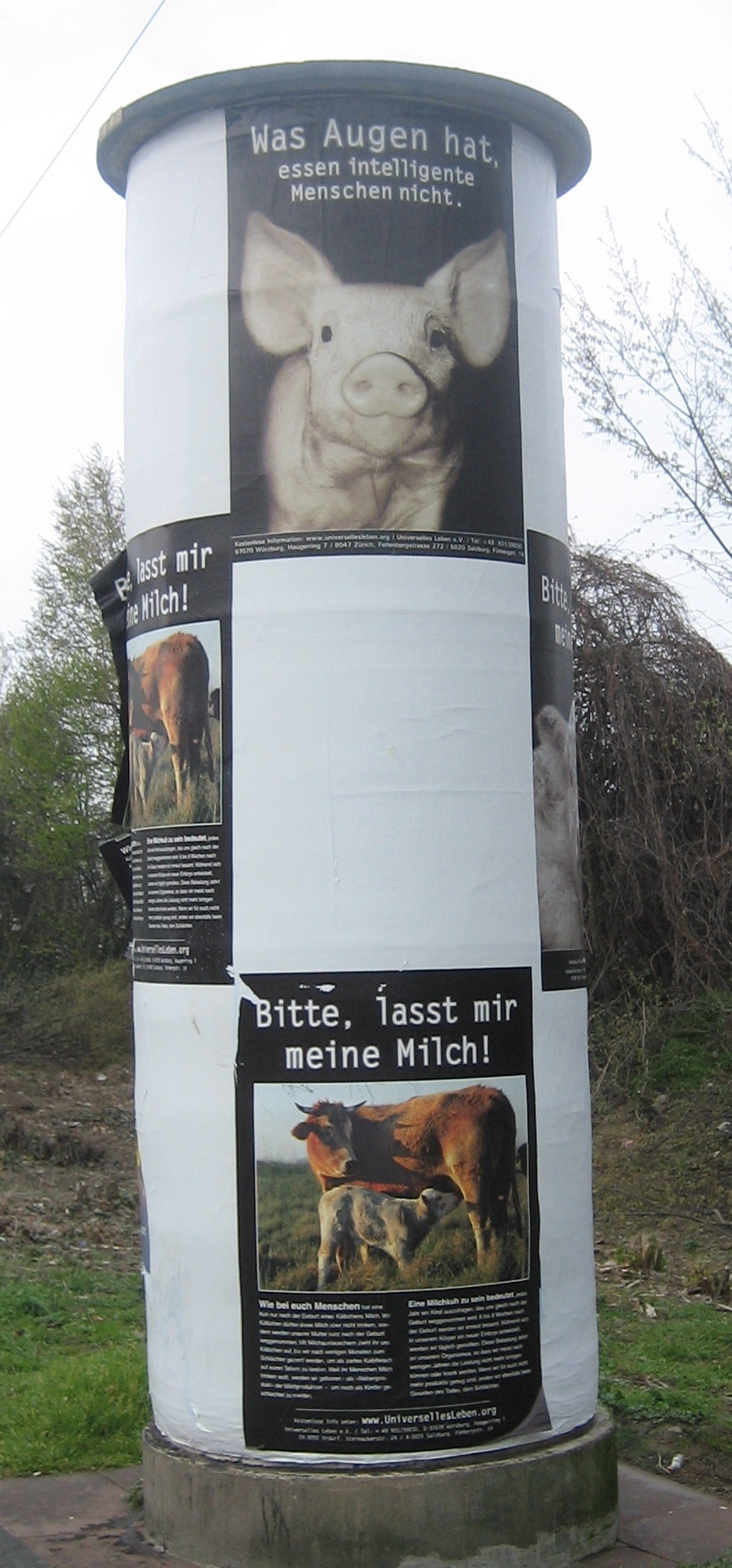
Advertisement for the Universal Life, seen in Neuwied, which promotes vegetarianism

Universal Life (German: Universelles Leben, unofficially abbreviated UL) is the name of a controversial new religious movement based in Marktheidenfeld, Germany, which is described by members as a part of the new revelation movement. The group was originally called Heimholungswerk Jesu Christi, but has been known as Universal Life since 1984.

== Organisation ==
The founding of Universal Life was through teachings distributed by Gabriele Wittek. These works were claimed to be revelations from Jesus Christ or other spiritual beings, which Gabriele received as a prophetess and promulgated. These are, along with the Sermon on the Mount and the 10 Commandments, the fundamental basis of the faith. In 2003, Wittek published her own bible, Das ist Mein Wort (This is My Word), also including anti-semitic phrases.

Members of Universal Life run, among other institutions, a school, two kindergartens, a natural healing clinic and five publishers. The beliefs of the group are propagated by Radio Santec of Marktheidenfeld through three TV stations, Die Neue Zeit TV, Sender Neu Jerusalem and Sophia TV, transmitted from SES Astra 1KR satellite at the 19.2° East orbital position. They operate agricultural establishments, which farm according to the principles of organic farming. However, these establishments are not officially connected to Universal Life.

== History ==
Gabriele Wittek claims to have heard the first "inner words" after the death of her mother. After a year, she saw her dead mother appear during a spiritual meeting, and spoke to her. Wittek claimed to have experienced several apparitions later, including of a spiritual being named "Spiritual Teacher Brother Emmanuel". Finally, she met Christ himself. On 18 April 1987 Christ allegedly spoke in a great revelation, among other things, about the "Inner Path". It concerns a mystic school of thought in which God is considered to be in people and in all living beings, according to Jesus' saying: "The kingdom of God is 'within' you."

In the past, Universal Life claimed contact with an alien from outer space named Mairadi.

== Adherents ==
Exact numbers are hard to determine, since there is no formal membership within Universal Life. Georg Schmid estimated, in his book Churches, Sects, Religions, the number of members to be 100,000 worldwide, including 4,000 in Germany. Other estimates claim 10,000 members worldwide, with 3,000 in the Würzburg region.

The association Universelles Leben e.V. has around 500 members. The inner circle, who live in communities in the Würzburg region and work on farms, calls itself the "Covenant Community of the New Jerusalem".

The activities of Universal Life are concentrated in Bavaria. The organisation is represented in other regions of Germany, as well as in Austria, Italy and in Switzerland. They also do activities in other countries, as Spain.

== Beliefs ==
Members believe in reincarnation and promote vegetarianism. Moreover, UL members refer to themselves as "Original Christians". In consequence, a characteristic feature of Universal Life is the fomenting of resentment against "established religious leaders," especially the Roman Catholic Church, which is the predominant religion in Bavaria. In 2010, for example, Universal Life failed in a lawsuit before the Freiburg Administrative Court in which it sought to prohibit the Catholic Church from calling itself "Christian." Since Jesus in UL reading is believed to have rejected violence against humans and animals as well as ecclesiastical institutionalism, Universal Life, according to the Catholic diocese of Trier, appeals primarily to "idealistically minded people" in search of "authentic Christianity" despite the fact that the group's teaching contains Far Eastern elements.

== See also ==
- Universelles Leben e.V. v. Germany
