= Marktheidenfeld =

- Town
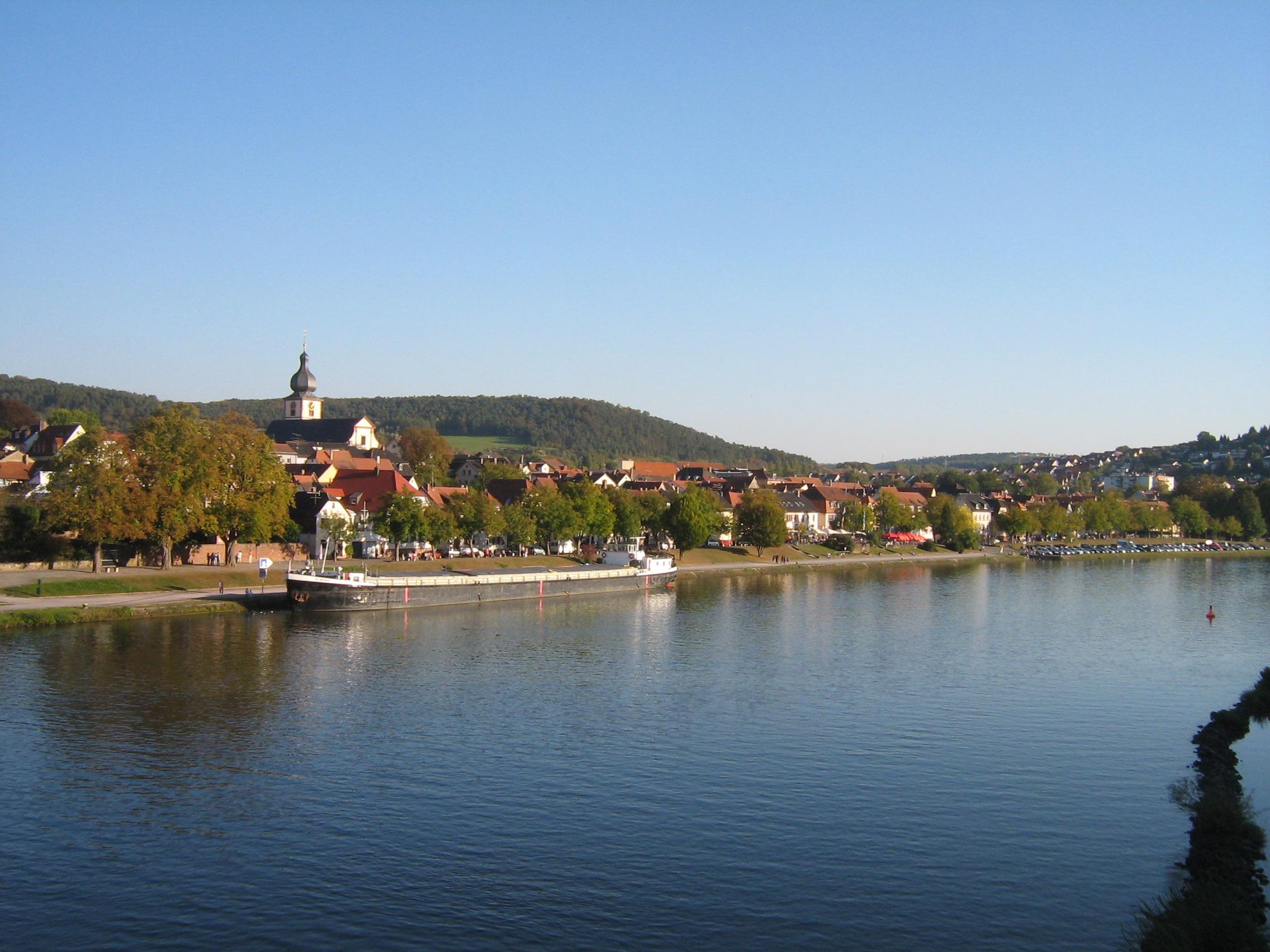
- Marktheidenfeld river front

- Coat of arms

- Location of Marktheidenfeld within Main-Spessart district
- Interactive map of Marktheidenfeld
- Location within Germany Location within Bavaria
- Coordinates: 49°51′N 9°36′E
- Country: Germany
- State: Bavaria
- Admin. region: Unterfranken
- District: Main-Spessart
- Subdivisions: 6 Stadtteile

Government
  - Mayor (2020–26): Thomas Stamm (CSU)

Area
  - Total: 35.7 km^{2} (13.8 sq mi)
- Elevation: 154 m (505 ft)

Population (2025-12-31)
  - Total: 11,306
  - Density: 317/km^{2} (820/sq mi)
- Time zone: UTC+01:00 (CET)
  - Summer (DST): UTC+02:00 (CEST)
- Postal codes: 97828
- Dialling codes: 0 93 91
- Vehicle registration: MSP
- Website: www.marktheidenfeld.de

Marktheidenfeld (German pronunciation: [maʁktˈhaɪdn̩fɛlt]) is a town in the Main-Spessart district in the Regierungsbezirk of Lower Franconia (Unterfranken) in Bavaria, Germany, and the seat (but not a member) of the Verwaltungsgemeinschaft (municipal association) of Marktheidenfeld. The town has around 11,000 inhabitants.

== Geography ==
=== Location ===
The town lies 24 km west of Würzburg at the Mainviereck (Main Square) on the eastern side of the Spessart (range), geologically on the seam between the Spessart red sandstone area and the Muschelkalk area of the Fränkische Platte (a flat, mostly agricultural region), which between the Main Square and the Maindreieck (Main Triangle) is known as the Marktheidenfelder Platte.

=== Subdivisions ===
Marktheidenfeld's Stadtteile are Glasofen (amalgamated in 1972), Zimmern (1974), Marienbrunn (1975), Altfeld, Michelrieth and Oberwittbach (all in 1978).

The town has the following Gemarkungen (traditional rural cadastral areas): Altfeld, Glasofen, Marienbrunn, Marktheidenfeld, Michelrieth, Oberwittbach and Zimmern.

== History ==
Heidenfeld may have arisen during the Frankish taking of the land in the early 8th century. Already by 855 a place by that name was mentioned as belonging to the Holzkirchen Monastery, which from this time belonged to the Fulda Abbey. The Counts of Wertheim, who were the monastery's Vögte also managed in the late 13th century to secure the same office over Heidenfeld.

In 1397, Marktheidenfeld was first described as a town (oppidum). Between 1522 and 1530, the Reformation was introduced by Georg II into the County of Wertheim, and thereby also into Marktheidenfeld. After a period in which Catholic and Protestant worship co-existed, the majority turned to Protestantism. The town also experienced an economic boom at that time. However, due to a bad harvest in 1524, a peasant uprising erupted in 1525. Although hesitant at first, the Count of Wertheim supported the local peasants for a while before their army was defeated at Würzburg. In 1556, the line of the Counts of Wertheim died out. Following extended inheritance disputes, Heidenfeld was taken over by the Prince-Bishop of Würzburg in 1612.

Under Bishop Julius Echter von Mespelbrunn the Counterreformation forced the local populace back into the Catholic church. This met with resistance and Echter established a new parish at Heidenfeld, as well as ordering the construction of a large church, the St.- Laurentius-Kirche. In 1615, the town was awarded the status of Flecken and over the next decades started to be known as "Marktheidenfeld".

From 1632 to 1634, after the Swedes’ victories in the Thirty Years' War, the town was once again part of the County of Wertheim and Protestant, albeit for only a short time, for the town soon returned to Würzburg.

In 1649, the name Marktheidenfeld made its first appearance, to distinguish the town from the Heidenfeld Monastery near Schweinfurt, which likewise belonged to Würzburg. The Amt of Würzburg was secularized in Bavaria's favour in 1803, and then ceded in a border adjustment treaty in 1807 to the Grand Duchy of Würzburg, with which it passed in 1814 to the Kingdom of Bavaria.

In 1814, Marktheidenfeld became the seat of the Homburg district court, forerunner of the Marktheidenfeld Bezirksamt (a local authority), which in 1939 took the name Landratsamt (district head's office). In 1948, Marktheidenfeld, which underwent a great upswing in population growth after the Second World War with the arrival of Heimatvertriebene, was raised to town. In 1972, the Marktheidenfeld district (Landkreis Marktheidenfeld) was abolished. Since the municipal reforms in Bavaria (1972–1976), the formerly self-administering communities of Altfeld, Glasofen, Marienbrunn, Michelrieth, Oberwittbach and Zimmern have belonged to Marktheidenfeld.

== Demographics ==
=== Population development ===
The town had some 530 inhabitants in 1542, roughly 730 to 800 in the late 16th century, 630 in 1633 and by the end of the Thirty Years' War, in 1648, possibly 500 to 550. In 1673 the figure had risen again to some 700, and about 1,100 people lived in Marktheidenfeld by 1720.

In 1920, after the First World War, 2,058 inhabitants lived in Marktheidenfeld, in 1925, this had shrunk slightly to 2,030, but had risen again to 2,232 in 1933. The population had further grown by 1938 to 2,687 inhabitants. After the Second World War, in 1946, there were 4,302 inhabitants. Within town limits, 8,364 inhabitants were counted in 1970, 9,421 in 1987 and in 2000 10,803.

On 1 July 2005, 9,034 inhabitants (76.5%) lived in the main town, and 2,773 (23.5%) in the six outlying centres. The total figure amounted to 11,807 inhabitants, of whom foreigners accounted for just under 8%.

=== Distribution of inhabitants among main town and outlying centres ===
Centre	Population
Marktheidenfeld (main town)	8,803
Altfeld	752
Glasofen	435
Marienbrunn	373
Michelrieth	557
Oberwittbach	144
Zimmern	457

as of 1 January 2008

=== Religion ===
- Catholic: 6,210 = 52.6% out of a total population of 11,807 (1 July 2005)
- Evangelical: 2,846 = 24.1%
- other or none: 2,751 = 23.3%

Marktheidenfeld is the base of the sect Universal Life.

== Economy ==
Municipal taxes in 1999 amounted to €13,797,000 (converted), of which net business taxes amounted to €8,484,000.

== Arts and culture ==
=== Regular events ===
From June to July, several events take place, such as the Altstadtfest (Old Town Festival) and the Caribbean Night.

Since 1999 each year in July the Marktheidenfeld Rowing Club has held the "Red Dragon Cup", at which company and club teams take part in dragon boat races in which even costumes are awarded prizes.

On the first weekend in August, the charburners’ club stages its traditional charburners’ festival (Köhlerfest) in the outlying centre of Glasofen.

In August, the Marktheidenfeld Folk Festival, the Laurenzi-Messe, takes place for ten days. The event's centrepiece is the Laurenzimarkt (market), which since 2007 has been on the bank of the Main.

== Attractions ==
=== Franck-Haus ===
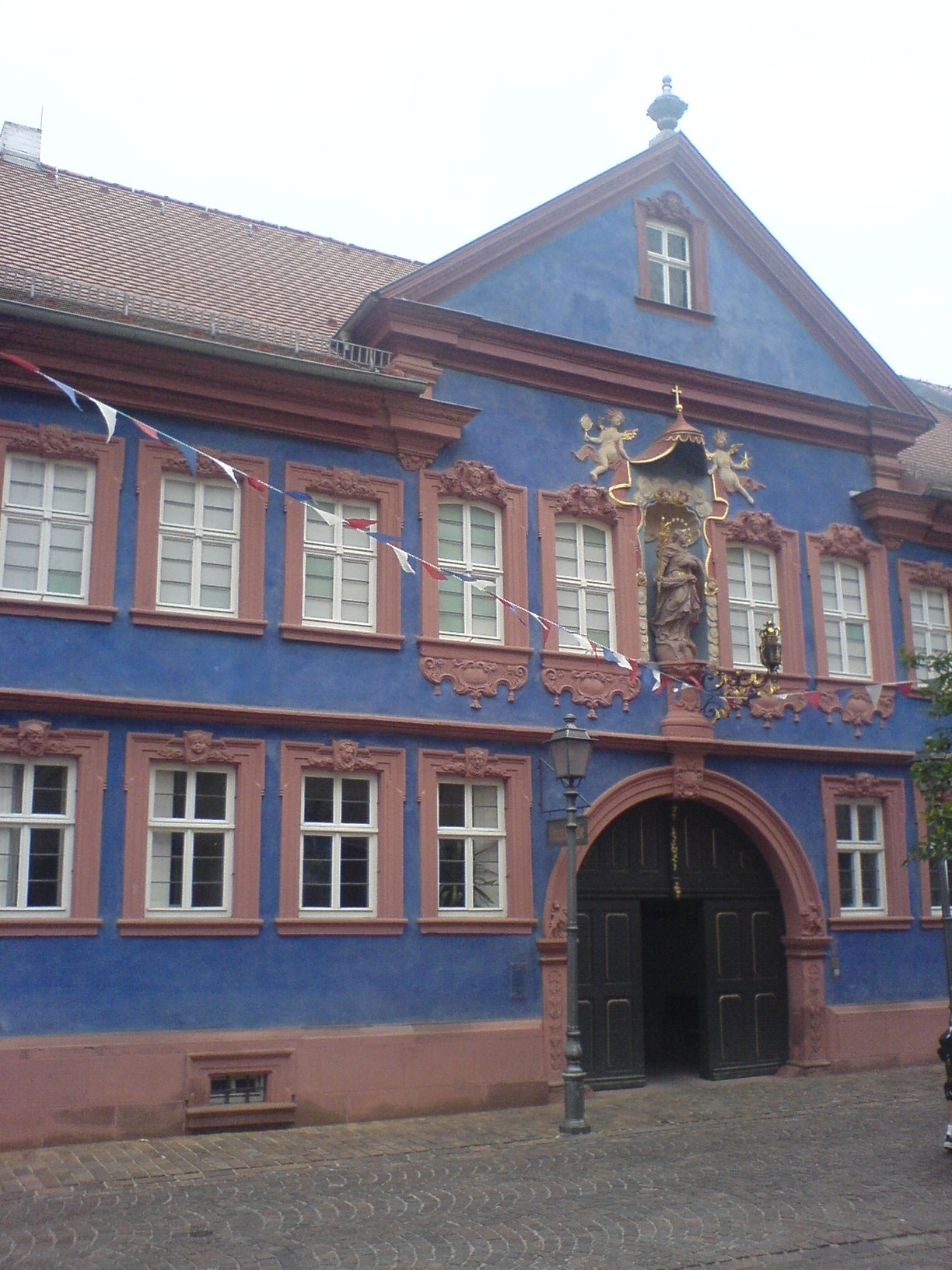
Franck-Haus – outside view

The Franck-Haus is a richly adorned townsman's house from the Baroque period, built in 1745, and is one of the town's most important sights. The building master was the wine merchant and salesman Franz Valentin Franck (1702–1777). Since 1987, the house has been under the town's ownership. From 1994 to 1998 it was renovated, for which the façade's smalt-blue colour, which at the time the house was built was the most expensive colour, was reconstituted. Today the house is used for exhibitions.

Permanent exhibits include the "world’s smallest library", a collection of miniature books from Valentin Kaufmann's legacy, a demonstration smithy, an old smith's workshop built in the courtyard, and an information room on painter and artistic craftsman Hermann Gradl's life and works.

=== St.-Laurentius-Kirche ===
Saint Lawrence's Church (St.-Laurentius-Kirche) has been rebuilt and renovated for more than 700 years. Overall, four major stages of construction, in Romanesque, Gothic, Baroque and Baroque Revival styles, respectively, can be discerned.

Its features include mediaeval frescoes in the choir and two tomb slabs from the 16th century.

=== Other sights ===
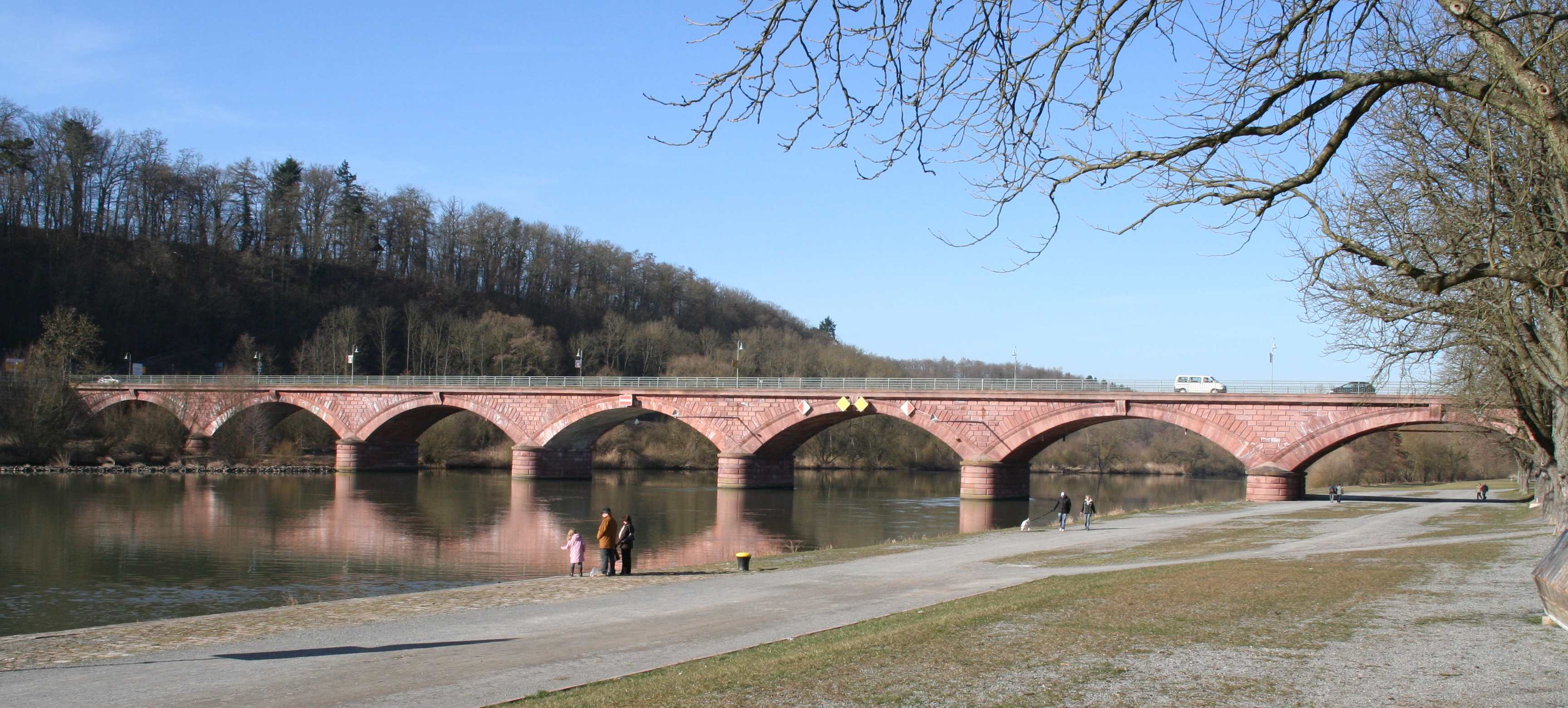
Alte Mainbrücke

The Alte Mainbrücke ("Old Main Bridge"), made out of red sandstone blocks, was built in the mid-19th century during King Ludwig I's reign, and opened in 1845. More than 150 years later, the old arch bridge was followed by the Nordbrücke ("North Bridge"), a bowstring arch bridge with the unusual feature of hangers that cross each other.

Other sights include the old town with historic timber-frame houses, the Main Promenade, the marketplace with the Fischerbrunnen (fountain), and the Kreuzbergkapelle (chapel), consecrated in 1890. This stands on its namesake mountain, the Kreuzberg, and can be reached by a Way of the Cross.

== Governance ==
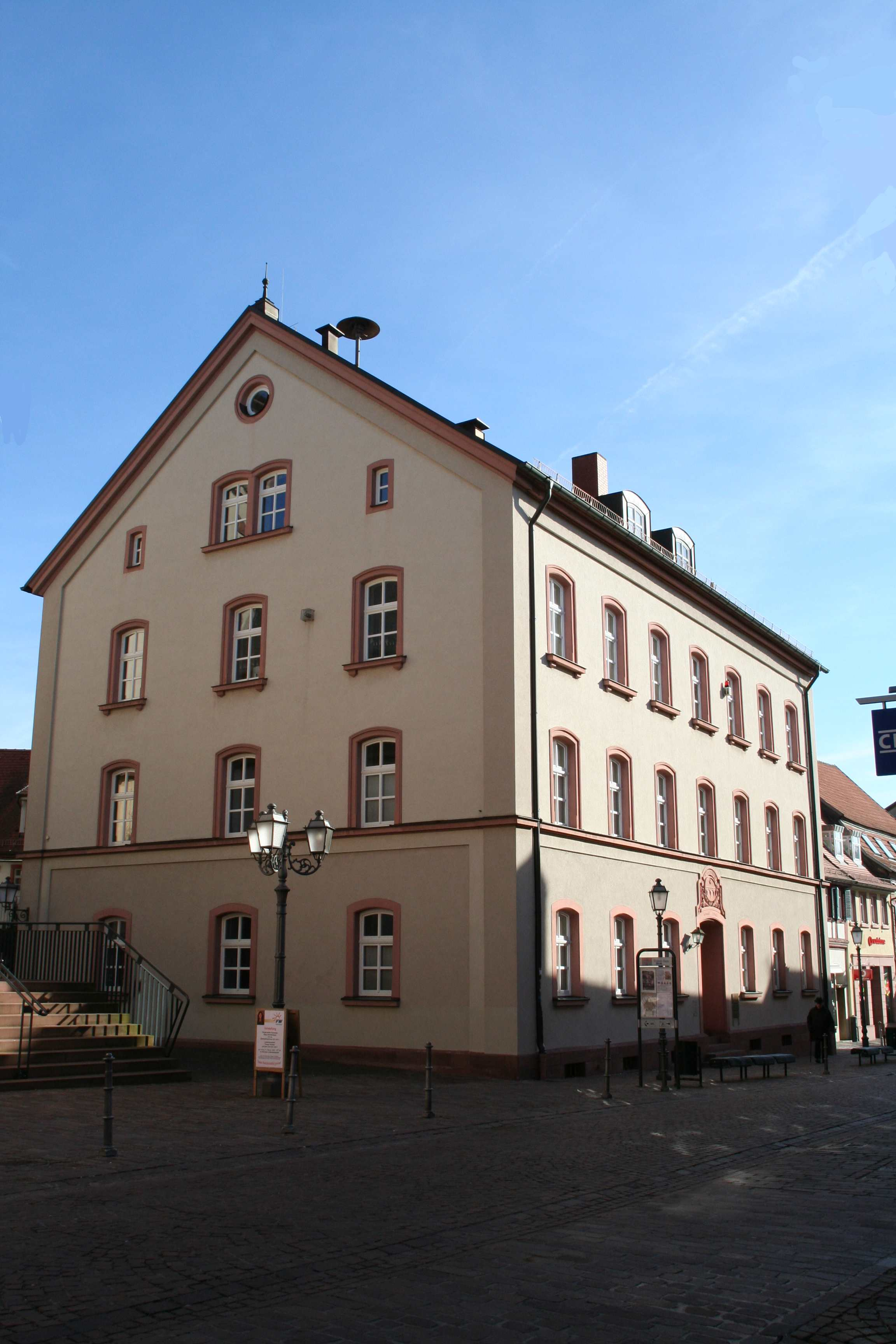
Historic town hall

=== Mayor ===
Since 1 May 2020, Thomas Stamm (CSU) has been the mayor.

=== Town council ===
Apportionment of the 24 seats (2008-2014 electoral period)

- CSU 9 seats
- SPD 5 seats
- FW 9 seats
- Bündnis 90/Die Grünen 1 seat

=== Coat of arms ===
The town's arms might be described thus: Argent, in base water azure, thereupon a bridge of stone gules masoned sable with three piers upon which segmented arches with keystones, in chief a mullet of the second.

The town's first arms were conferred on 7 September 1883 and showed similar charges, the main differences being that the bridge – which is the local bridge across the Main – bore a golden uppercase cursive L with a silver crown on top on the middle spandrel, which was flanked each side by two digits of the year 1846 (the bridge's building date), that the arches were round rather than segmented and had no keystones, and that the mullet (star shape) was Or (golden) rather than azure (blue). The water was also "proper", meaning that it was shown in natural colour. The current form of the coat of arms has been used since 1930, but was not actually conferred until 1965.

== Twin towns – sister cities ==
Marktheidenfeld is twinned with:

- Montfort-sur-Meu, France, since 1988
- Pobiedziska, Poland, since 2007
- Germantown, Ohio, United States of America, since 1980

== Infrastructure ==
=== Transport ===
==== Waterway ====
The river Main is a Federal Waterway (Bundeswasserstraße) of the first order for which the Aschaffenburg Water and Ship Transport Office (Wasser- und Schifffahrtsamt Aschaffenburg) is responsible.

==== Road ====
The Federal Autobahn A 3 (Nuremberg-Frankfurt) runs east-west, cutting across Staatsstraßen (State Roads) 2299 and 2315 in the outlying centre of Altfeld, whereas Bundesstrasse 8, running through the municipal area, serves as an Autobahn feeder road.

==== Public transport ====
A well-developed bus network run by the Nahverkehrsgesellschaft Main-Spessart ("Main-Spessart Local Transport Company") links the town and its environs. Within town runs a bus.

==== Other ====
There is a glider airfield in the outlying centre of Altfeld.

=== Public institutions ===
- Town administration
- Verwaltungsgemeinschaft (municipal administrative association) of Marktheidenfeld
- Financial office outpost
- Landratsamt (district administration) outpost (with vehicle licensing centre, youth office and health office service centre)
- Police
- Marktheidenfeld fire brigade

== Education ==
- Friedrich-Fleischmann-Grundschule, Marktheidenfeld (primary school)
- Grund- und Hauptschule des Schulverbands Oberndorf, Bischbrunn (primary school and Hauptschule)
- Hauptschule am Maradies
- Staatliche Realschule, Marktheidenfeld (state Realschule)
- Balthasar-Neumann-Gymnasium, Marktheidenfeld
- Staatliche Fachoberschule und Berufsoberschule, Marktheidenfeld (state higher vocational and professional school)
- Altenpflege- und Krankenpflegeschule des Landkreises Main-Spessart, Marktheidenfeld (district school for geriatric care and nursing)
- Förderschulen: St. Kilian und St. Nikolaus, Marktheidenfeld (special education)
- 2 private music schools and the municipal music institute, Marktheidenfeld
- Volkshochschule Marktheidenfeld (folk high school)

== Notable people ==
- Johann Friedrich Anton Fleischmann (1766–1798), composer
- Cornel Schmitt (b. 4 January 1874, d. 13 January 1958), educator and composer
- Sigfried Held (b. 1942 in Freudenthal), national footballer (world vice-champion)
- Peter Kiesewetter (b. 1945), composer
- Roland Matthes (b. 1950 in Pößneck), backstroke swimmer (four-time Olympic champion)
- Regina Schleicher (b. 1974 in Würzburg), competition cyclist (world champion)
