= Eschau =

- Municipality
- Coat of arms

- Location of Eschau within Miltenberg district
- Interactive map of Eschau
- Location within Germany Location within Bavaria
- Coordinates: 49°49′13″N 9°15′26″E
- Country: Germany
- State: Bavaria
- Admin. region: Unterfranken
- District: Miltenberg
- Subdivisions: 4 Ortsteile

Government
  - Mayor (2026–): Jochen Weikert (FWE)

Area
  - Total: 38.11 km^{2} (14.71 sq mi)
- Elevation: 171 m (561 ft)

Population (2025-12-31)
  - Total: 3,883
  - Density: 101.9/km^{2} (263.9/sq mi)
- Time zone: UTC+01:00 (CET)
  - Summer (DST): UTC+02:00 (CEST)
- Postal codes: 63863
- Dialling codes: 09374
- Vehicle registration: MIL, OBB
- Website: www.eschau.de

Eschau (German pronunciation: [ˈɛʃaʊ]) is a market municipality in the Miltenberg district in the Regierungsbezirk of Lower Franconia (Unterfranken) in Bavaria, Germany. It has a population of around 3,800.

== Geography ==
=== Location ===
Eschau lies in the Bavarian Lower Main (Bayerischer Untermain) region. The community is located in the southwestern part of the Mittelgebirge Spessart. The river Elsava, a tributary of the Main, flows through the municipal territory. The main village is located in the valley of the Elsava but the municipality extends into the wooded hills and encompasses the outlying village of Wildensee, located to the east in the valley of the Aubach.

=== Subdivisions ===
The community has the five Gemarkungen (traditional rural cadastral areas): Eschau, Hobbach, Oberaulenbach, Sommerau and Wildensee.

Eschau has ten Ortsteile: Eschau, Unteraulenbach, Wildenstein, Wildenthal, Hobbach, Oberaulenbach, Sommerau, Schafhof, Wildensee and Hofwildensee.

=== Neighbouring communities ===
Eschau borders on (clockwise from the north): Heimbuchenthal, Dammbach, Altenbuch, Stadtprozelten, Dorfprozelten, Collenberg, Mönchberg and Elsenfeld. Except for the former two (Aschaffenburg district) these are all part of the Miltenberg district.

== History ==
Eschau was an Amt of the Lordship of Wildenstein held by the Counts of Erbach and mediatized by Prince Primate von Dalberg (Principality of Aschaffenburg/Grand Duchy of Frankfurt) in 1806, which in 1814 passed to Austria, and shortly thereafter to the Kingdom of Bavaria.

== Demographics ==
Within town limits, 3,395 inhabitants were counted in 1970, 3,89|1 in 1987 and in 2000 4,145. On 2 January 2008, another count yielded the figure 4,213.

By age, the population breaks down thus:

- 0 - 6 — 206
- 6 - 14 — 365
- 15 - 17 — 138
- 18 - 24 — 384
- 25 - 29 — 273
- 30 - 49 — 1.252
- 50 - 64 — 841
- 65 + — 754

== Economy ==
Municipal taxes in 1999 amounted to €1,961,000 (converted), of which net business taxes amounted to €383,000.

According to official statistics, there were 8 workers on the social welfare contribution rolls working in agriculture and forestry in 1998. In producing businesses this was 332, and in trade and transport 56. In other areas, 135 workers on the social welfare contribution rolls were employed, and 1,478 such workers worked from home. There was one processing business. Eight businesses were in construction, and furthermore, in 1999, there were 63 agricultural operations with a working area of 758 ha, of which 407 ha was cropland and 345 ha was meadowland.

== Governance ==
=== Mayor ===
The mayor is Jochen Weikert (FWE).

=== Community council ===
The council is made up of 16 council members with seats apportioned thus:

- Christlich Soziale Union (CSU) 6 seats
- Freie Wähler Eschau (FWE) 8 seats
- Hobbacher Wählergemeinschaft (HWG) 2 seats

=== Coat of arms ===
The community’s arms might be described thus: Per fess embattled of one, in chief Or a pair of balances sable, in base three mullets of six, one and two, argent.

The Counts of Rieneck are known to have been in Eschau by 1232. The settlement was raised to market community in 1285. When the Counts died out in 1559, Eschau, together with the Lordship of Wildenstein passed to the Counts of Erbach, with whom it stayed until the Old Empire came to an end in 1803. The tinctures gules and Or (red and gold) are drawn from the arms once borne by the Counts of Rieneck. The mullets (star-shapes) are drawn from the arms once borne by the Counts of Erbach. The battlement-shape forming the escutcheon’s partition stands for the market community’s fortifications. As a symbol of law and justice, the balance stands for the community’s market rights.

The arms have been borne since 1962.

== Attractions ==
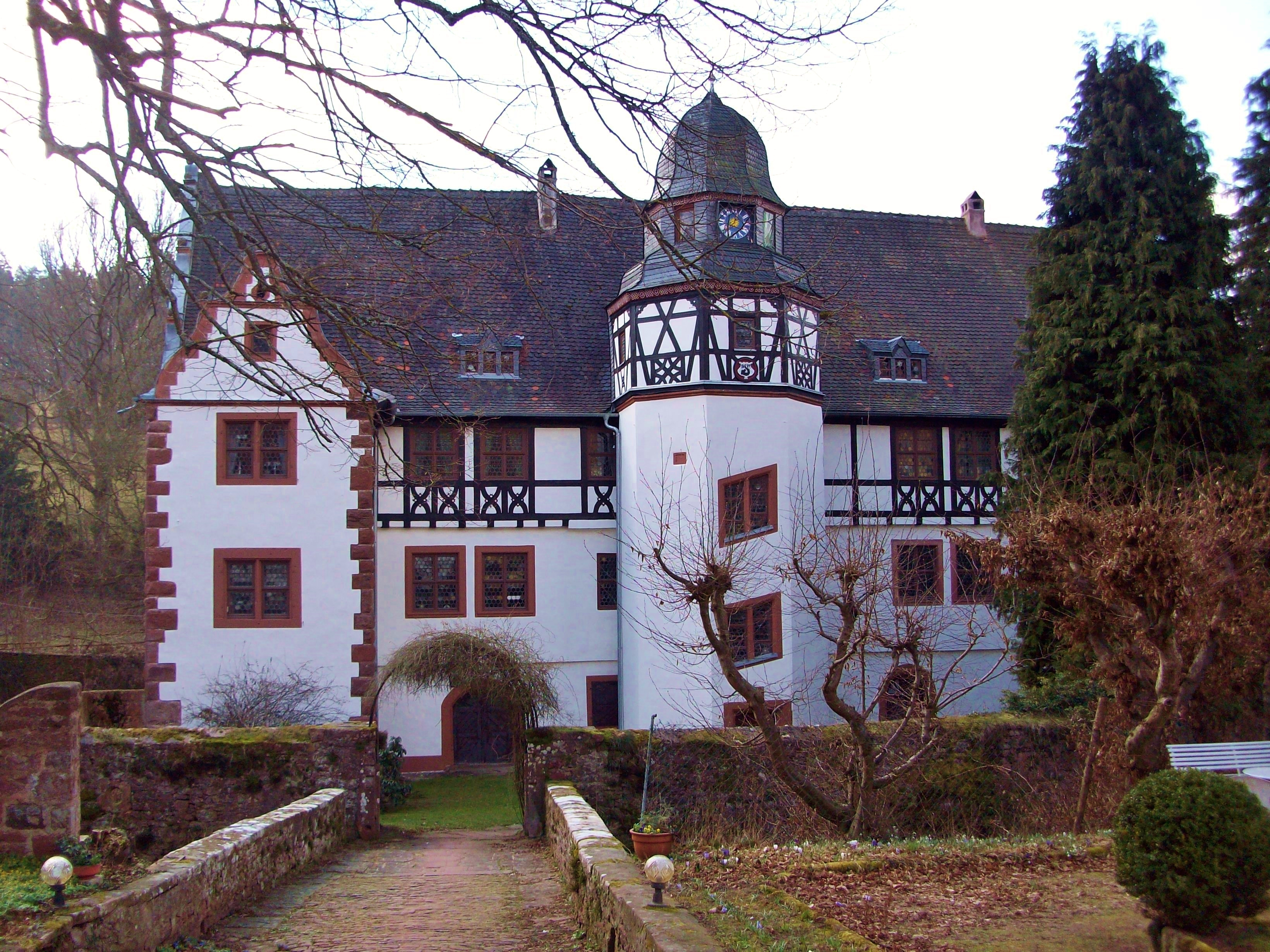
Wasserschloss Oberaulenbach

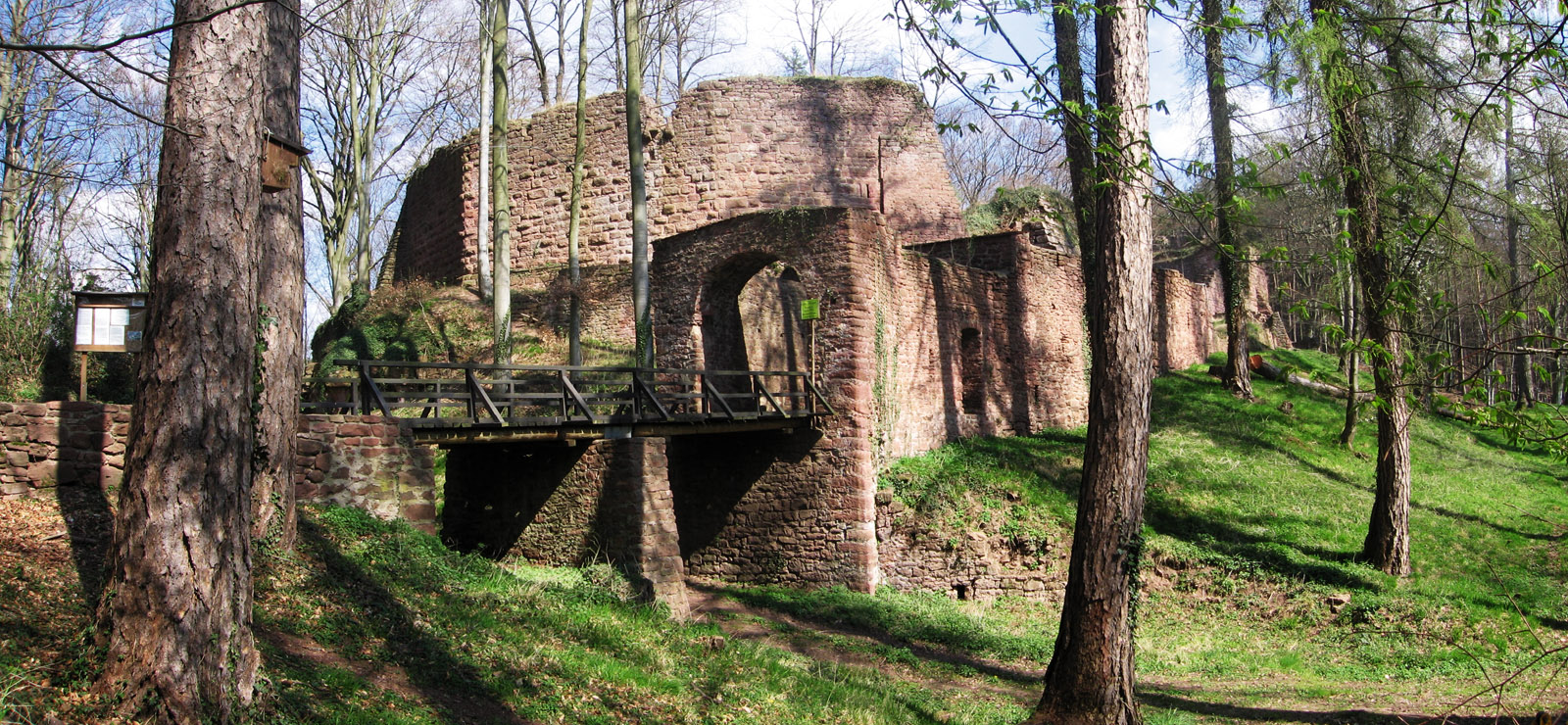
Burg Wildenstein

Notable historic buildings include the Wasserschloss Oberaulenbach, a Renaissance castle (private property), the castle ruin Burg Wildenstein and the Wasserschloss Sommerau (also private property).

Also nearby, but located just outside the municipal territory, is the plateau of Geishöhe, one of the few Spessart hills whose peak is not densely wooded and thus offers a panoramic view.

== Education ==
In 1999 the following institutions existed in Eschau:

- Kindergartens: 200 places with 162 children
- Primary schools: 1 with 20 teachers and 326 pupils

== Notable people ==
The expressionist painter Fritz Schaefler (1888−1954) spent his childhood until 1900 in Eschau.

The CSU politician Berthold Rüth was born on 28 March 1958 in Hobbach, Eschau. He has been a Member of the Bavarian Landtag since 6 October 2003.
