= Stadtprozelten =

- Town
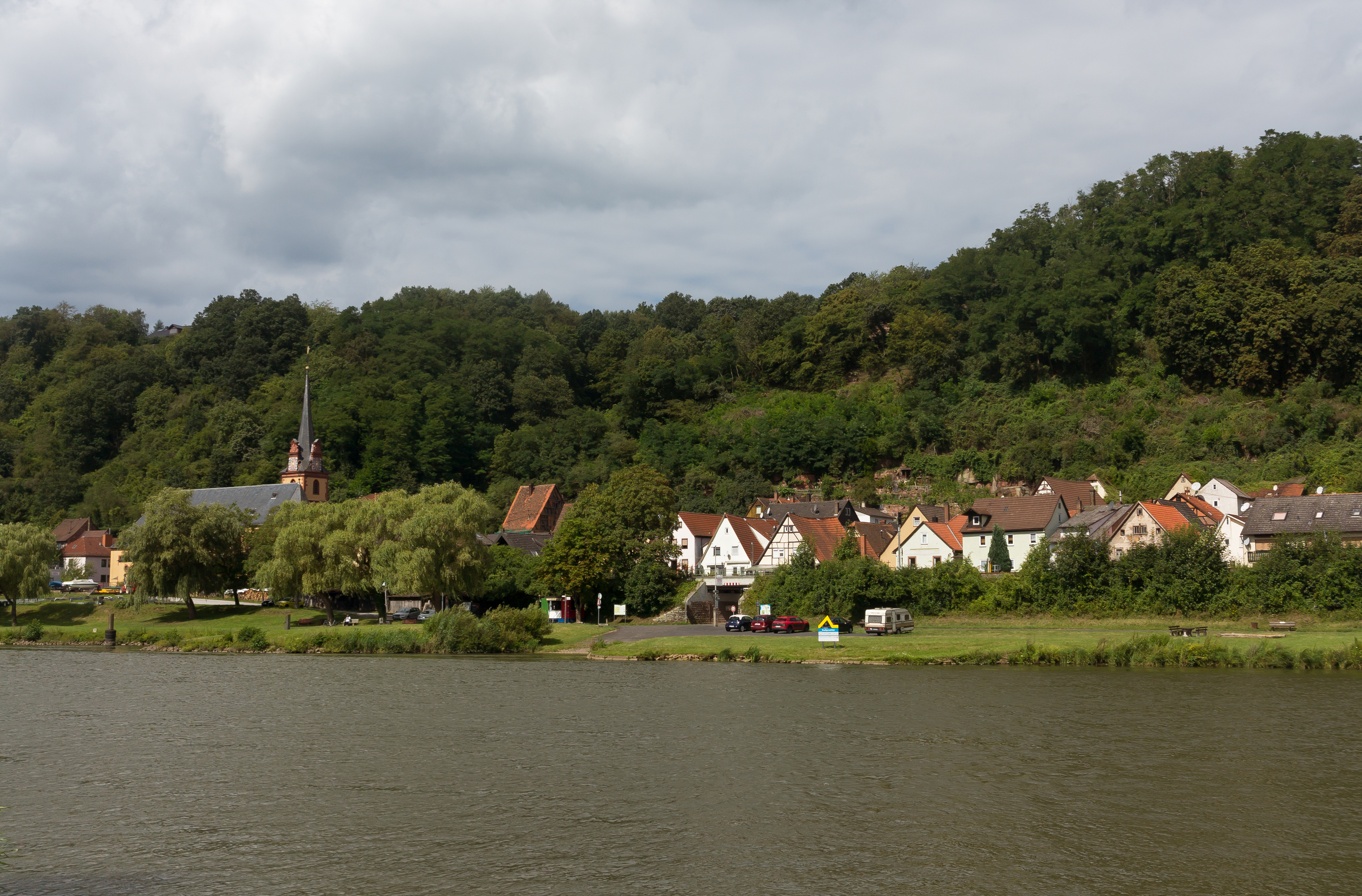
- View of the town with the Church of the Assumption of the Virgin Mary

- Coat of arms

- Location of Stadtprozelten within Miltenberg district
- Interactive map of Stadtprozelten
- Location within Germany Location within Bavaria
- Coordinates: 49°47′N 9°25′E
- Country: Germany
- State: Bavaria
- Admin. region: Lower Franconia
- District: Miltenberg
- Municipal assoc.: Stadtprozelten

Government
  - Mayor (2020–26): Rainer Kroth (CSU)

Area
  - Total: 10.87 km^{2} (4.20 sq mi)
- Elevation: 134 m (440 ft)

Population (2025-12-31)
  - Total: 1,542
  - Density: 141.9/km^{2} (367.4/sq mi)
- Time zone: UTC+01:00 (CET)
  - Summer (DST): UTC+02:00 (CEST)
- Postal codes: 97909
- Dialling codes: 09392
- Vehicle registration: MIL
- Website: www.stadtprozelten.de

Stadtprozelten (German pronunciation: [ˌʃtatpʁoˈtsɛltn̩]) is a town and municipality in the Miltenberg district in the Regierungsbezirk of Lower Franconia (Unterfranken) in Bavaria, Germany and the seat of the Verwaltungsgemeinschaft (municipal association) of Stadtprozelten.

A traditional, mainly Catholic town, it is known to its inhabitants as Stadtprozle.

== Geography ==
=== Location ===
Stadtprozelten lies on the southern edge of the Spessart (range) and on the right bank of the Main in the middle of the south side of the Mainviereck (“Main Square”), 8 km northwest of Wertheim am Main. Stadtprozelten lies directly opposite de:Mondfeld, which is on the left bank of the Main. They are linked by a ferry.

=== Subdivisions ===
The Stadtteil of Neuenbuch lies 2 km north of the town centre.

=== Neighbouring communities ===
Stadtprozelten is bordered by (from the north, clockwise): Altenbuch, Faulbach, Wertheim (Baden-Württemberg), Dorfprozelten and Eschau.

== History ==
In 1287, Stadtprozelten had its first documentary mention. The former Electoral Mainz Amt passed in 1803 to Prince Primate von Dalberg’s newly formed Principality of Aschaffenburg, with which it passed in 1814 (by this time it had become a department of the Grand Duchy of Frankfurt) to the Kingdom of Bavaria. In the course of administrative reform in Bavaria, the current municipality came into being with the Gemeindeedikt (“Municipal Edict”) of 1818.

650 years of holding town rights were celebrated in 2005. The first documentary mention, however, is not yet fully established beyond doubt.

== Government ==
=== Town council ===
The council is made up of 12 council members, not counting the mayor, with seats apportioned thus:

Election year	CSU	SPD	FWG Stadtprozelten-Neuenbuch	Total
2002	5	2	5	12 seats
2008	8	4	n.a.	12 seats
2014	7	3	1	12 seats
2020	5	3	4	12 seats

Elections in 2014:

- CSU: 7 seats
- SPD: 3 seats
- FWG: 1 seat
- independent: 1 seatElections in 2020:
- CSU: 5 seats
- SPD: 3 seats
- FWG: 4 seat

=== Mayor ===
Rainer Kroth (CSU) was elected mayor in March 2020. He succeeded Claudia Kappes (born 1953, CSU) who was the mayor since 2002, she was re-elected in 2008 and 2014.

=== Coat of arms ===
The town’s arms might be described thus: Argent a castle with a gate tower gules and roofs azure, above the gateway the letter B Or, in chief dexter the sun in his glory, and in chief sinister the moon in her increment of the last.

The oldest known town seals come down from the 16th century. The building in the arms might be the old castle held here by the Teutonic Knights. The sun and moon are presumably old town symbols. The letter B comes from another coat of arms dating from 1600 seen on a pane of glass from the town hall. It stands for the town’s former name, Brodselden (the name Stadtprozelten first crops up in 1319).

The arms have been borne at least since the 16th century.

== Culture and sightseeing ==
=== Buildings ===
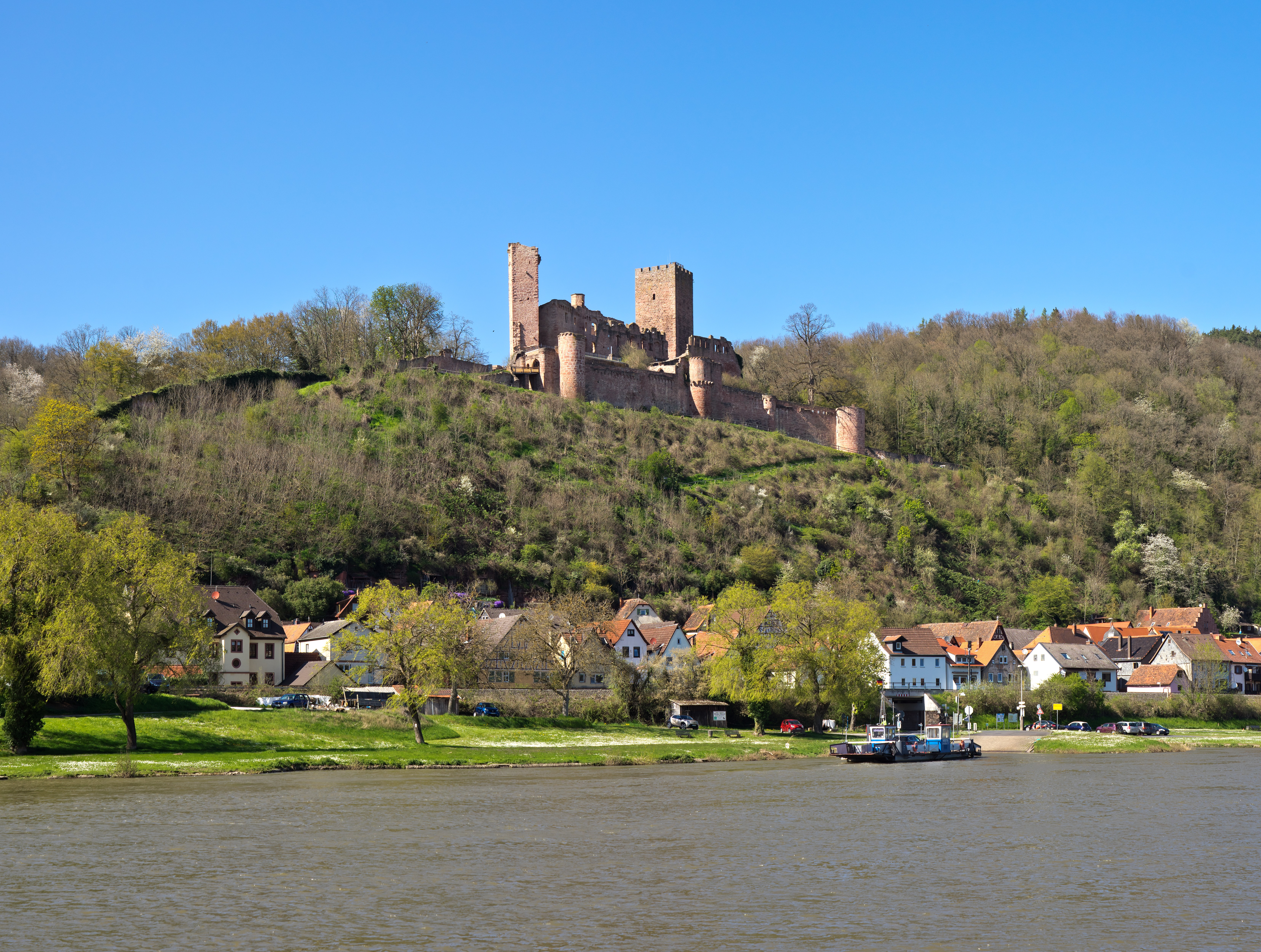
The Henneburg (castle) on the Kühlberg in Stadtprozelten

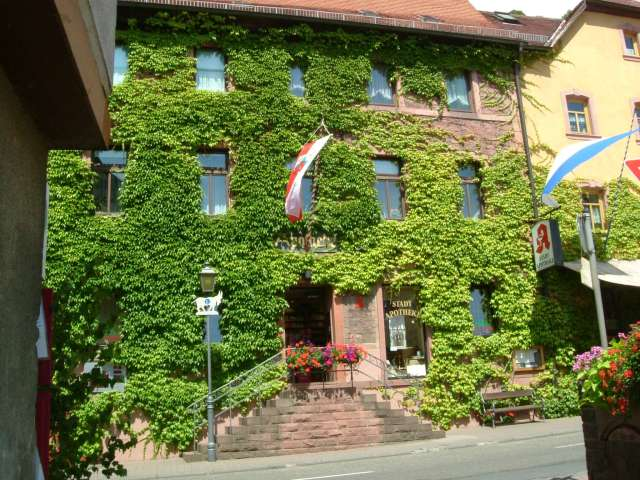
Apothecary

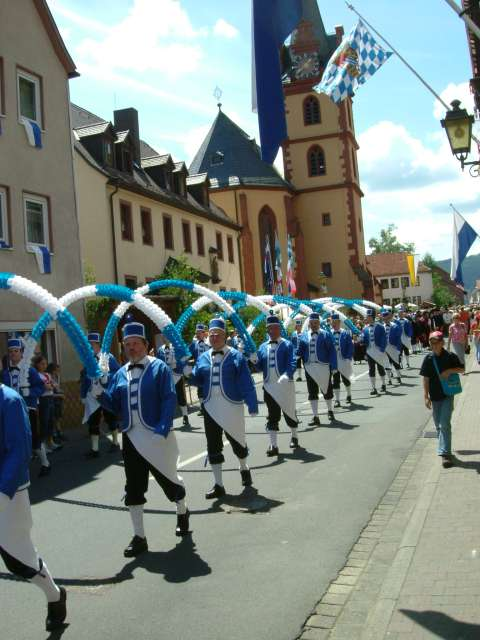
Extraordinary performance by the Stadtprozelten Coopers’ Dancing Group on the occasion of the historic Town Festival on 9 and 10 July 2005

Overlooking the town is the Henneburg castle ruin on the hill known as the Kühlberg.

Other important monuments in town are:

- Hospital, likely endowed by Elisabeth von Hohenlohe about 1320;
- Hospital administration: this building has been used since the 18th century as a postal station and a schoolhouse;
- Parish church built in Gothic style: the interior, as far as possible, has been kept in its original style; the former hospital church was raised to parish church about 1800;
- Town hall from 1520: the stair tower was built only in 1621; the oriel sits on two Tuscan columns;
- Benefiziatenbau ("Prebedary’s Building"), probably a rectory until 1811;
- Apothecary: built after 1811 on the spot formerly occupied by the Georgenkapelle (chapel);
- Ämtergebäude ("office building") from about 1600: an Electoral Mainz administrative building, in the 19th century a state court, and then later a savings and loan institution;
- Former prison from the 19th century;
- Remnants of the late mediaeval town wall;
- The forest house, built in 1854 in the "new Munich Byzantine style".

=== Regular events ===
==== Schäfflertanz ====
The Schäfflertanz (“Coopers’ Dance”) is put on according to tradition every seven years. The coopers’ group, possibly Germany’s biggest and the only one in white and blue, is made up of well over 60 and up to 90 actors, that is, master coopers, the barrel hoop swinger, dancers, clowns, waiters and the boys who pull the cart. Because it is a group dance, the number of these exclusively male dancers is always a multiple of eight.

This tradition originated in Munich. Beginning about 1830, journeyman coopers brought the dance to other places such as Eggenfelden, Frontenhausen, Geiselhöring, Mainburg, Mühldorf, Murnau, Kelheim, Landshut, Partenkirchen and Wasserburg. In 1887, the Schäfflertanz was put on in Stadtprozelten for the first time. The most recent performance was in 2013.

==== "Doude Moo" ====
This event has its roots in the time of the Plague, when dead bodies had to be fetched from the houses. The body gatherers would call out as they went through town "Hejo - doude Moo - moje kommd en annern droo" (roughly, "Hello, dead man, tomorrow it’ll be another’s turn"; this is dialectal, not standard High German).

Nowadays children enjoy the sweets that are thrown out into the street from all the houses as a straw doll is borne ahead of them out of the town and then burnt. "Doude Moo" is always held on the third Sunday before Easter.

The event is known in official circles as "Todemo".

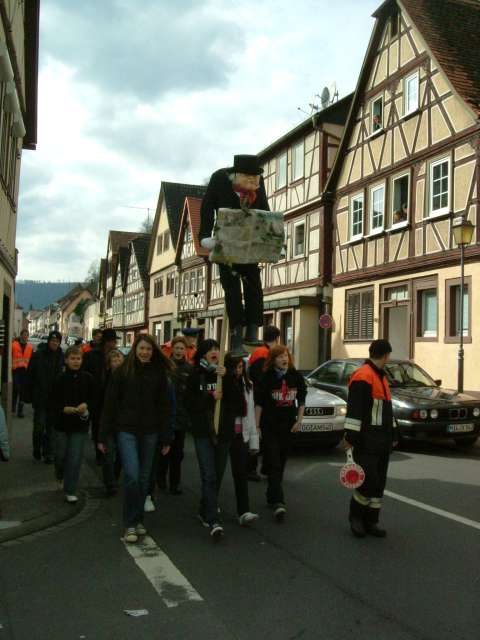
The "Dead Man" is borne out...

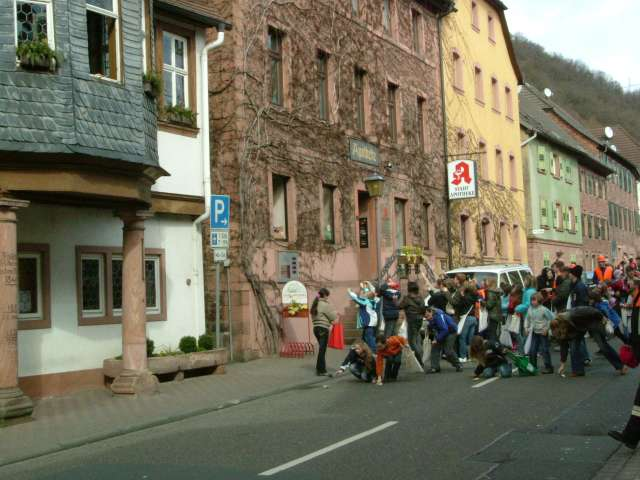
They shout raus, raus...

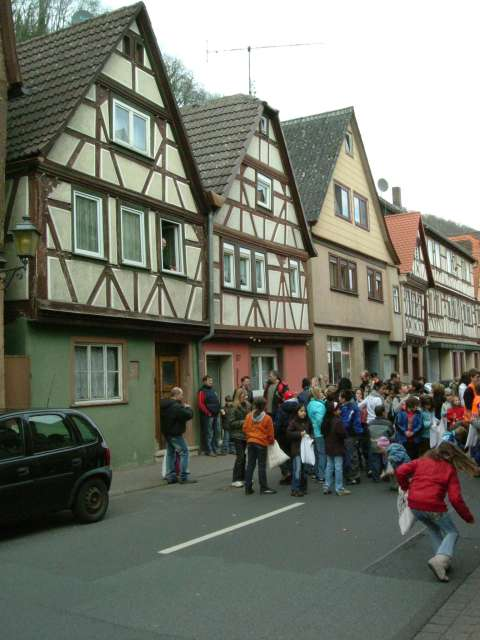
and then gather the sweets up.

== Notable people ==
- Georg Anton von Stahl, Bishop of Würzburg, was born in Stadtprozelten on 13 April 1805.
