= Dorfprozelten =

- Municipality
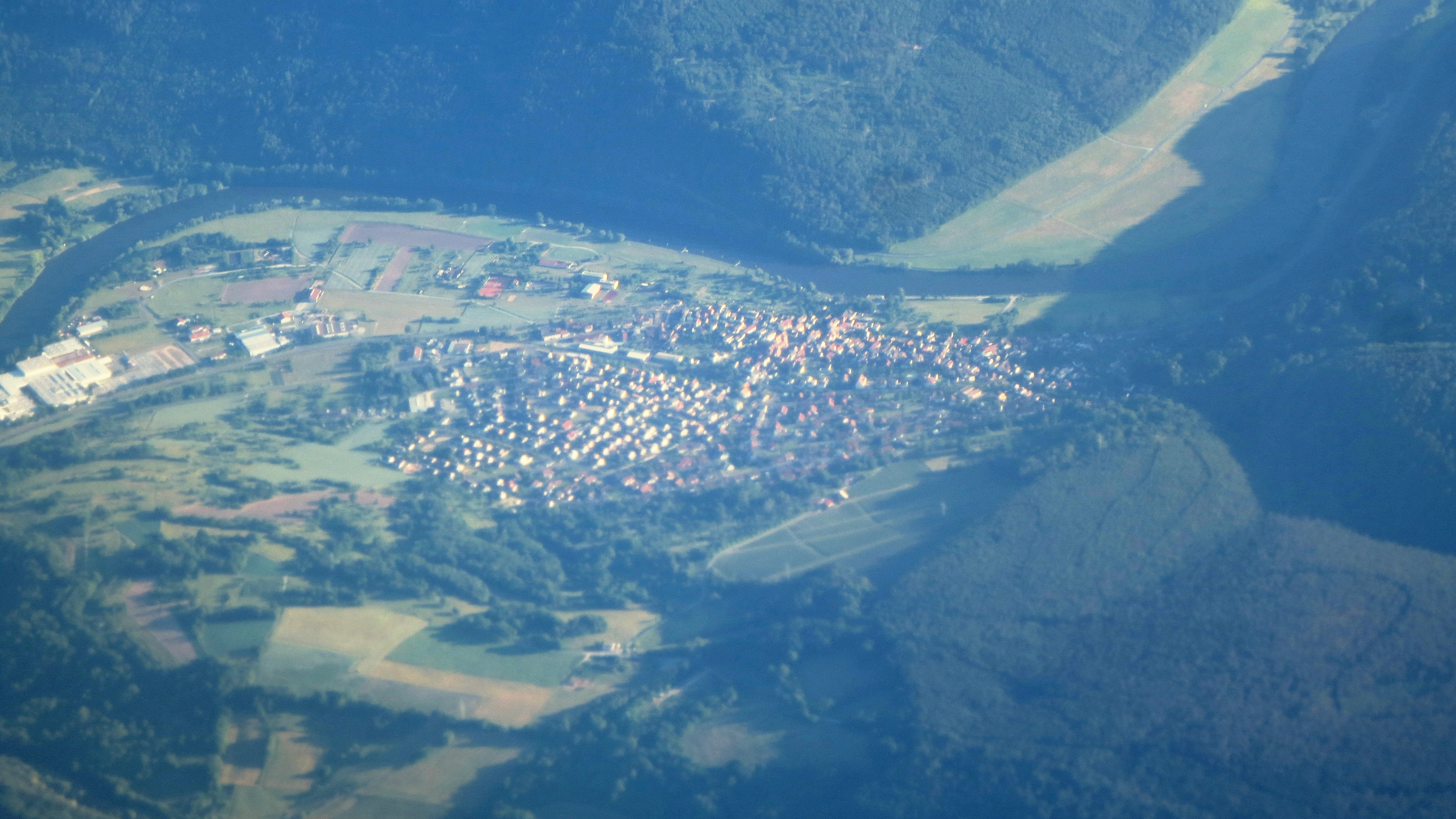
- Aerial picture of Dorfprozelten from the north

- Coat of arms

- Location of Dorfprozelten within Miltenberg district
- Interactive map of Dorfprozelten
- Location within Germany Location within Bavaria
- Coordinates: 49°47′N 9°23′E
- Country: Germany
- State: Bavaria
- Admin. region: Unterfranken
- District: Miltenberg

Government
  - Mayor (2020–26): Lisa Steger (CSU)

Area
  - Total: 10.39 km^{2} (4.01 sq mi)
- Elevation: 141 m (463 ft)

Population (2025-12-31)
  - Total: 1,702
  - Density: 163.8/km^{2} (424.3/sq mi)
- Time zone: UTC+01:00 (CET)
  - Summer (DST): UTC+02:00 (CEST)
- Postal codes: 97904
- Dialling codes: 09392
- Vehicle registration: MIL
- Website: www.dorfprozelten.de

Dorfprozelten is a municipality in the Miltenberg district in the Regierungsbezirk of Lower Franconia (Unterfranken) in Bavaria, Germany. It is one of the oldest settlements on the Lower Main. Sandstone quarrying was a major industry once. The village has also long been known as the home of people involved in inland (river) navigation. Today, Dorfprozelten has a population of close to 1,800.

== Geography ==
=== Location ===
Dorfprozelten lies on the right bank of the river Main between Miltenberg and Wertheim on the southern edge of the Mittelgebirge Spessart.

=== Subdivisions ===
The community has only the Gemarkung (traditional rural cadastral area) of Dorfprozelten.

=== Neighbouring communities ===
Dorfprozelten borders on (clockwise from the north): Eschau, Stadtprozelten, Wertheim (Baden-Württemberg), Freudenberg (Baden-Württemberg) and Collenberg.

== History ==
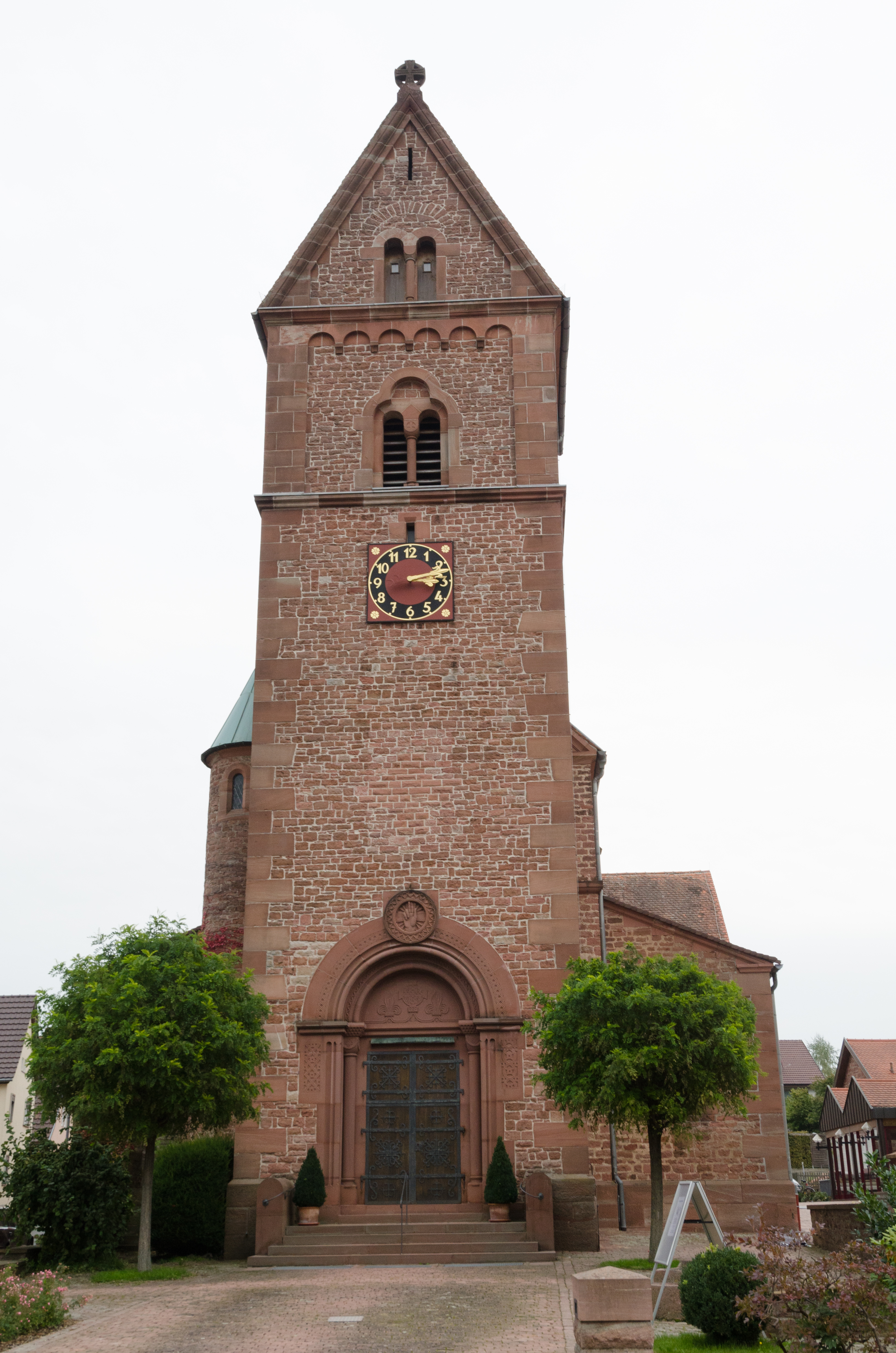
St. Vitus, Romanesque Revival church

A church was built here in 1009 by Willigis, Archbishop of Mainz. In 1012, Dorfprozelten had its first documentary mention under the name Brotselden or Bradselden. There are various explanations for the name's origin.

Previously ruled by the Archbishop of Mainz, with the 1803 Reichsdeputationshauptschluss Dorfprozelten became a part of Prince Primate von Dalberg's newly formed Principality of Aschaffenburg, with which it passed in 1814 (by this time it had become a department of the Grand Duchy of Frankfurt) to the Kingdom of Bavaria.

In the course of administrative reform in Bavaria, the current community came into being with the Gemeindeedikt ("Municipal Edict") of 1818.

== Demographics ==
Within town limits, 1,627 inhabitants were counted in 1970, 1,741 in 1987 and in 2000 1,972.

== Economy ==
Until the 1970s, the community was home to a substantial sandstone industry. Dorfprozelten stonemasons took part in building, among other projects, the Hermitage in Saint Petersburg, Mainz Cathedral and the Reichstag. Sandstone quarrying also supported the local shipping industry, which for a time made Dorfprozelten Germany's inland port village.

Today, Dorfprozelten is home to various branches of industry. Among others, a big car component manufacturer has settled here. On the slopes of the Main, in the Dorfprozeltener Predigtstuhl vineyard, Franconian wine is grown.

According to official statistics, there were 192 workers on the social welfare contribution rolls working in producing businesses in 1998. In trade and transport this was 0. In other areas, 54 workers on the social welfare contribution rolls were employed, and 717 such workers worked from home. There were 9 processing businesses. Two businesses were in construction, and furthermore, in 1999, there were 5 agricultural operations with a working area of 17 ha.

Municipal taxes in 1999 amounted to €987,000 (converted), of which net business taxes amounted to €123,000.

== Governance ==
The mayor is Lisa Steger (CSU), elected in March 2020.

=== Coat of arms ===
The community’s arms might be described thus: Per fess gules a wheel spoked of six argent and argent a cross sable, a base wavy of three azure.

The black cross on a silver background is the coat of arms once borne by the Teutonic Knights, who are known to have been in the municipal area about 1260. About 1319 or 1320, the Knights acquired Prozelten Castle and the community of Dorfprozelten, then also known as Niederprozelten or Altprozelten (Dorf means “village” in German, while Nieder means “lower” and Alt “old”). The Teutonic Knights held the lordship over Dorfprozelten, and the Vogtei. These, however, were traded to Electoral Mainz in 1484 until the Old Empire was dissolved in 1803. The six-spoked wheel and the tinctures argent and gules (silver and red) refer to Mainz’s former overlordship. The wavy blue base symbolizes the Main and also the shipping that has been important since days of yore, above all in connection with wood transport from the Spessart.

The arms have been borne since 1954.

== Arts and culture ==
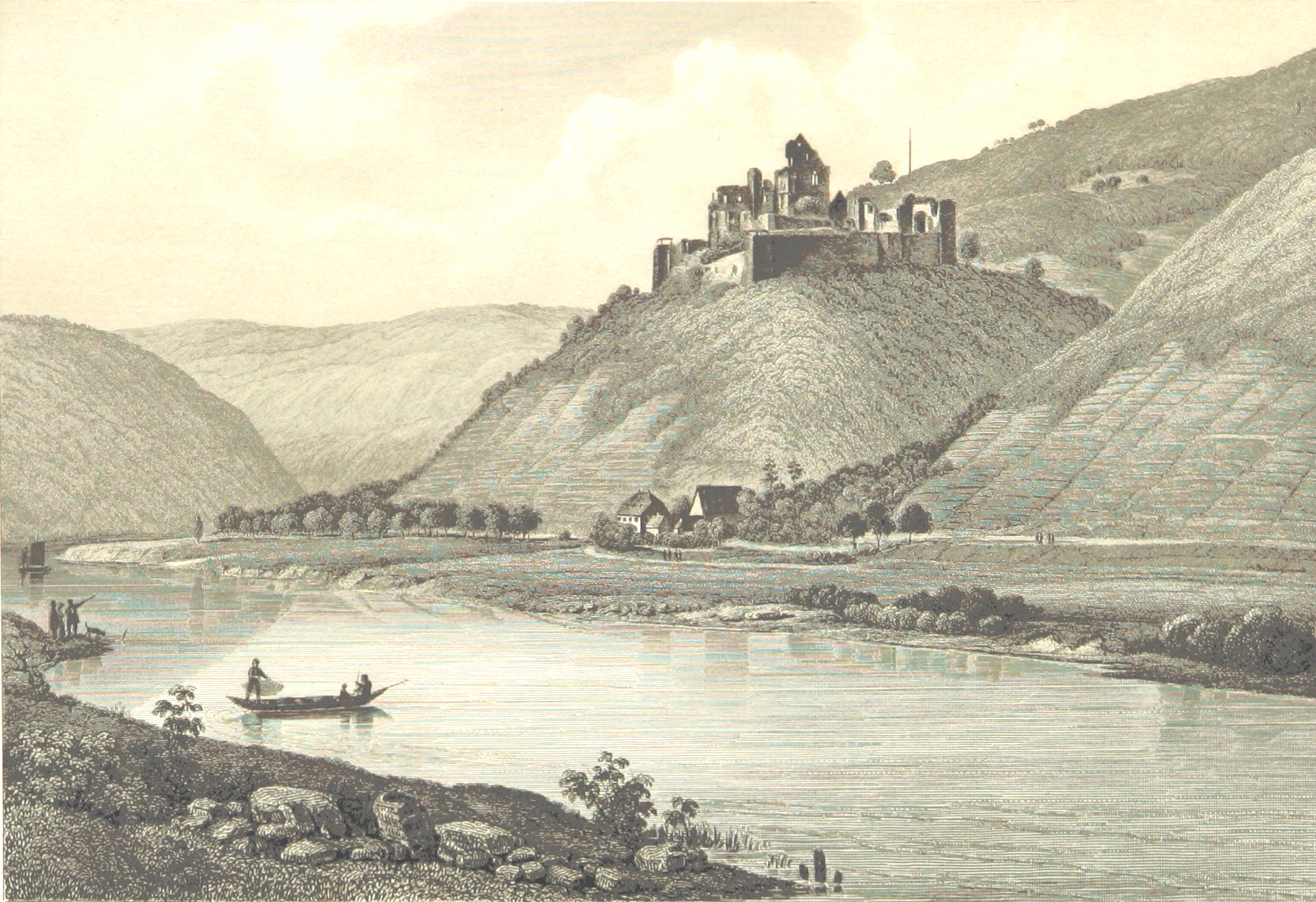
Steel engraving of Collenburg, 1847

The Collenburg, a ruined castle, is located just inside the municipal territory.

See also list of monuments at Dorfprozelten (German)

== Education ==
In 1999 the following institutions existed in Dorfprozelten:

- Kindergartens: 100 places with 88 children
- Primary schools: 1 with 16 teachers and 288 pupils
