= Aubach (Elsava) =

River in Germany

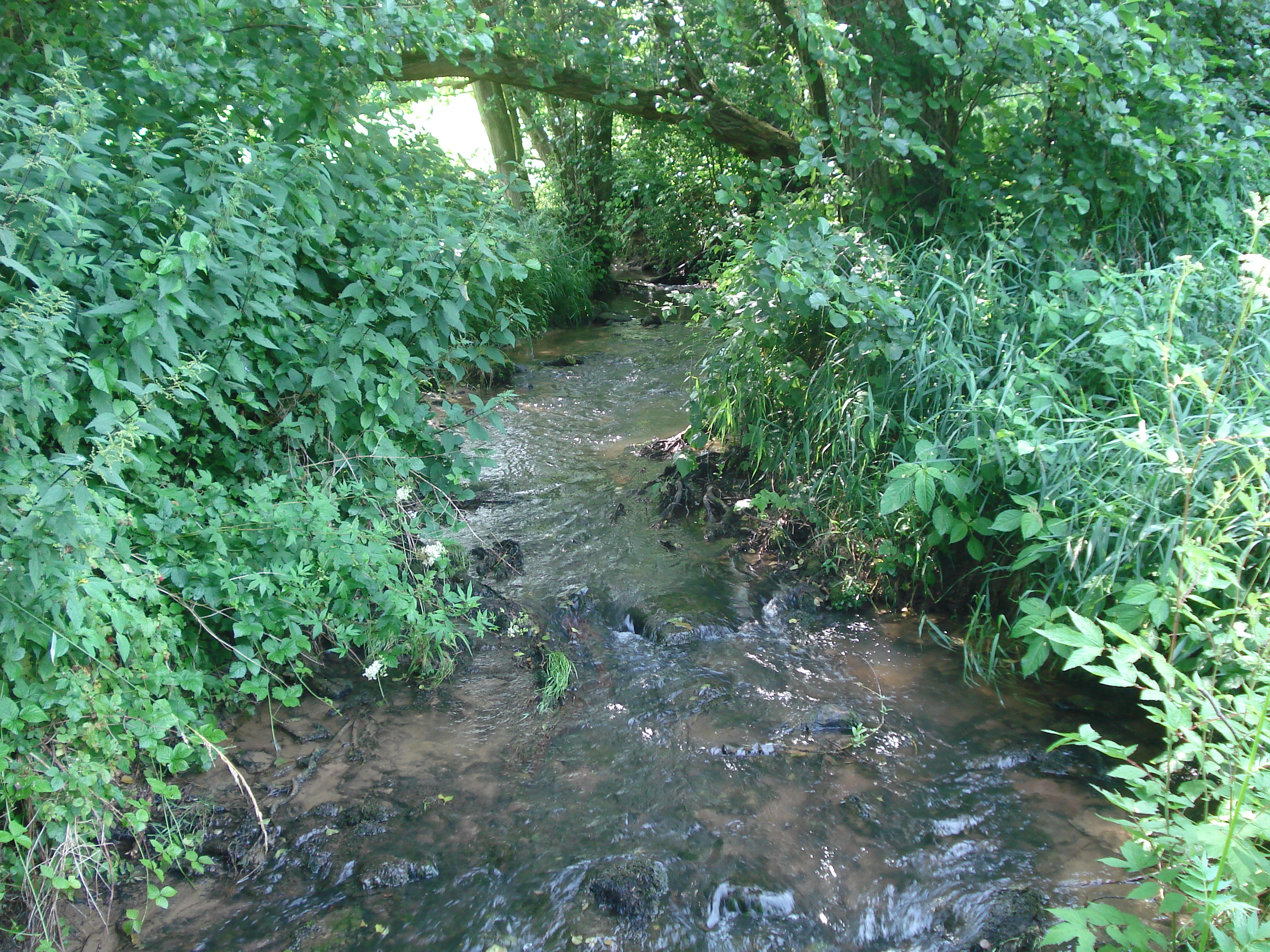
- The Aubach at Eschau

- Location of mouth in Bavaria

Location
- Country: Germany
- State: Bavaria

Physical characteristics
- Mouth
  - location: Elsava
  - coordinates: 49.8169°N 9.2426°E
- Length: 14.0 km (8.7 mi)

Basin features
- Progression: Elsava→ Main→ Rhine→ North Sea

Aubach is a river of Bavaria, Germany. It is a left tributary of the Elsava in Eschau.

== See also ==
- List of rivers of Bavaria
