= Mömlingen =

- Municipality
- Coat of arms

- Location of Mömlingen within Miltenberg district
- Interactive map of Mömlingen
- Location within Germany Location within Bavaria
- Coordinates: 49°51′N 9°5′E
- Country: Germany
- State: Bavaria
- Admin. region: Unterfranken
- District: Miltenberg

Government
  - Mayor (2026–): Katharina Hotz (Free Voters)

Area
  - Total: 18.45 km^{2} (7.12 sq mi)
- Elevation: 148 m (486 ft)

Population (2025-12-31)
  - Total: 4,728
  - Density: 256.3/km^{2} (663.7/sq mi)
- Time zone: UTC+01:00 (CET)
  - Summer (DST): UTC+02:00 (CEST)
- Postal codes: 63853
- Dialling codes: 06022
- Vehicle registration: MIL
- Website: www.moemlingen.de

Mömlingen is a municipality in the Miltenberg district in the Regierungsbezirk of Lower Franconia (Unterfranken) in Bavaria, Germany.

== Geography ==
=== Location ===
Mömlingen, which styles itself “Gateway to the Odenwald”, lies framed by wooded heights of the northern Odenwald on the Bavaria-Hesse boundary in the charming Mümling valley. Bordering on Mömlingen are the Bavarian district of Aschaffenburg in the north, and in the west the two Hessian districts of Darmstadt-Dieburg and Odenwaldkreis.

== History ==
=== Celts and Romans ===
Witnessing a prehistoric human presence are many barrows and sporadic finds, some of which go back to the Stone Age. From Roman times come parts of so-called Jupiter Columns (or Jupitergigantensäulen in German) and other worship stones. They show, together with the many traces of Roman country houses (villae rusticae) in the heights all around Mömlingen, the extent of the once mighty Roman Empire, which only a few kilometres away to the east held its frontier at the “Wet Limes”, namely the Main.

=== Frankish settlement ===
An early Frankish settlement beginning in the 6th century in what is now the heart of the community is witnessed by an extensive row grave field unearthed by archaeologists west of the village. Besides the many graves with scanty or missing grave goods, graves with extraordinarily rich appointments were discovered, such as a Mainz gold coin and remnants of silk, leading to the conclusion that there was a stately noble class among the villagers. These nobles could well have driven the Frankish taking of the land on royal orders.

=== First documentary mention ===
The settlement itself crops up in written records as Miminingen in a document from the Imperial Abbey at Fulda issued sometime between 802 and 817 (Abbot Ratgar's time in office). Compared to many neighbouring communities, this is a very early first documentary mention.

To early Frankish times can be dated the establishment of the first church in Mömlingen. Bearing witness to this is what is said to be the typically Frankish custom of consecrating the old parish church to Saint Martin of Tours.

=== Church and nobility – Mainz and Breuberg ===
From the Middle Ages, many ecclesiastical institutions and members of the upper and middle nobility are known who had holdings in the municipal area, imposed taxes and held sundry rights. In 1024, Emperor Heinrich II donated the County of Stockstadt, within which lay Mömlingen, to the Imperial Abbey at Fulda. In 1278, the place passed with the County of Bachgau to Electoral Mainz. The circumstances of Mömlingen's belonging politically (until 1803) to the Electoral Mainz tithing region of the Bachgau while village jurisdiction, extensive landholdings and further traditional entitlements were held by the lords at the nearby Breuberg Castle led to neverending disputes between the territorial overlords of Mainz and Breuberg.

=== Lords of Mimling – Hans Memling ===
In the Late Middle Ages, members of a, probably, lower noble family named “von Mimling” (among other spellings) began cropping up in documents, mostly as clergymen and tithe counts. Historical research leaves no doubt that the forebears of the famous painter Hans Memling, born about 1435 in Seligenstadt, came from Mömlingen. His works can now be found hanging in the world's most famous painting galleries.

=== Hausen hinter der Sonne ===
South of Mömlingen, on the north slope of the Buchberg, once stood the village of Hausen hinter der Sonne (the affix meaning “Behind the Sun”), belonging to the Bishopric of Bamberg. The great countrywide wave of Plague that swept across the land in 1348 may already have thoroughly decimated the inhabitants, but the little settlement finally died in the early 16th century when the last few inhabitants moved to Mömlingen, likely under the effects of war. Mömlingen's municipal area thereby grew considerably. Even neighbouring Hainstadt gained land area by the small village's death.

=== Thirty Years’ War and its aftermath ===
Information about Mömlingen's size in the Late Middle Ages can be drawn from an interest register from 1426. At this time, the Counts of Wertheim, as holders of the lordship of Breuberg, were taxing 62 farms. Hence, Mömlingen was quite a grand place. Grave effects on Mömlingen's development were brought by the Thirty Years' War (1618–1648). Plague, sacking and pillaging harried the people, leaving only a few survivors by 1650. Many longtime families had been taken away by this dreadful war. Soon after the war ended, many new names come forth from the archives. Newcomers arrived mainly from the South Tyrol, France and the Netherlands.

The Thirty Years' War also thwarted the building of a new local church. Only in 1774-1777 could the plan be realized. The old parish church built in the Baroque style is said to be the community's landmark.

=== Mömlingen passes to Bavaria ===
With the onset of the 19th century, an epoch that had lasted more than 600 years came to an end when Mömlingen ceased to be part of Electoral Mainz’s once vast holdings. In 1803 it passed to the newly formed Principality of Aschaffenburg, with which it passed in 1814 (by 1810 it had become a department of the Grand Duchy of Frankfurt) to Bavaria.

Today the community of Mömlingen, which since the Second World War has undergone significant growth through building, is a lower centre that has an abundance of not-for-profit institutions.

== Politics ==
=== Mayor ===
- 2008–2026: Siegfried Scholtka (born 1962)
- since 2026: Katharina Hotz (born 1980)

=== Community council ===
The council is made up of 16 council members, not counting the mayor, with seats apportioned thus:

- CSU 9 seats
- FW 7 seats

(Elections in March 2020)

=== Town partnerships ===
- La Rochette, Savoie, France since 1992

=== Coat of arms ===
The community’s arms might be described thus: Gules, a wheel spoked of six argent between in chief three roses of the second seeded Or in bar arched, in base two mullets of six of the second.

Although the example in this article does not show it clearly, the German blazon clearly states that the roses are to be “seeded Or”, that is, with golden centres (“Rosen mit goldenen Butzen”).

The six-spoked wheel, the so-called Wheel of Mainz, comes from the arms borne by the Archbishopric of Mainz, to which the community belonged until the Old Empire's downfall in 1803. The heraldic roses are drawn from the arms once borne by the Counts of Wertheim, and the mullets (star-shapes) are from those once borne by the Schenken (roughly, “stewards” or “bearers”) of Erbach.

The arms have been borne since 1955.

== Culture and sightseeing ==
=== Buildings ===
- The old parish church, St. Martin, a Baroque church, built in the years 1774 to 1777

== Personalities ==
- Drafi Deutscher (1946-2006), singer, lived during the last years of his life in Mömlingen
