= Elsenfeld =

- Municipality
- Coat of arms

- Location of Elsenfeld within Miltenberg district
- Interactive map of Elsenfeld
- Location within Germany Location within Bavaria
- Coordinates: 49°51′N 9°10′E
- Country: Germany
- State: Bavaria
- Admin. region: Unterfranken
- District: Miltenberg
- Subdivisions: 3 Ortsteile

Government
  - Mayor (2020–26): Kai Hohmann (CSU)

Area
  - Total: 24.37 km^{2} (9.41 sq mi)
- Elevation: 123 m (404 ft)

Population (2025-12-31)
  - Total: 9,069
  - Density: 372.1/km^{2} (963.8/sq mi)
- Time zone: UTC+01:00 (CET)
  - Summer (DST): UTC+02:00 (CEST)
- Postal codes: 63820
- Dialling codes: 06022 (Eichelsbach: 09374)
- Vehicle registration: MIL
- Website: www.elsenfeld.de

Elsenfeld (German pronunciation: [ˈɛlzn̩fɛlt]) is a market municipality in the Miltenberg district in the Regierungsbezirk of Lower Franconia (Unterfranken) in Bavaria, Germany. It is located on the river Main between the hills of the Spessart, east of the river, and Odenwald, west of the river. Elsenfeld has a total population of around 9,000.

== Geography ==
=== Location ===
Elsenfeld lies in the "Bavarian Lower Main Region" (Bayerischer Untermain) on the Main's right bank. Running through the community is the brook Elsava, which empties into the Main at Elsenfeld.

=== Subdivisions ===
The community has the following Gemarkungen (traditional rural cadastral areas): Eichelsbach, Elsenfeld, Rück, Schippach and Himmelthal (formerly a monastery estate).

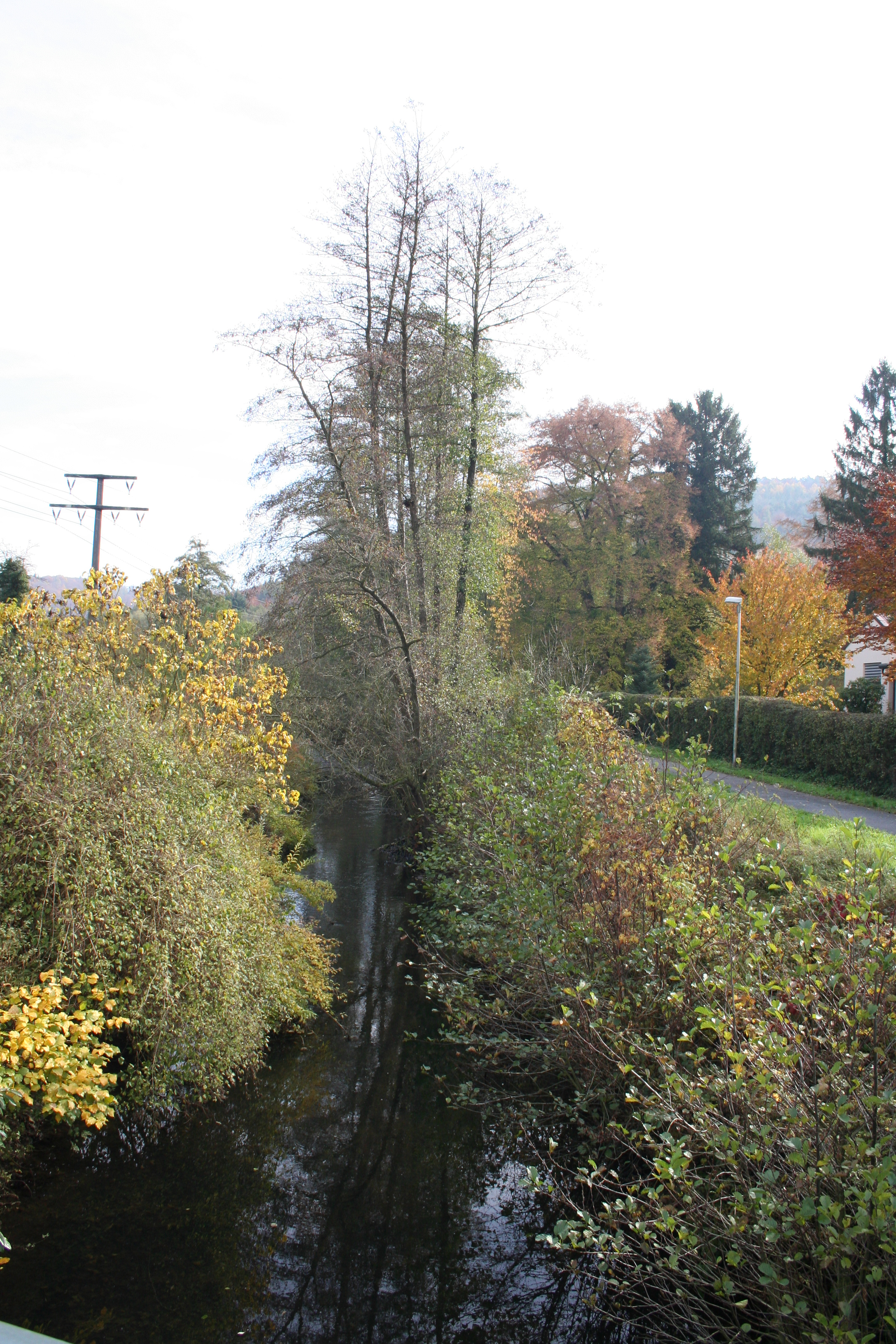
The Elsava between Rück (left) and Schippach (right)

== Etymology ==
The name Elsenfeld comes from the brook's name, Elsava, and means "Flowing Water on the Alder Ground". Until the late 17th century, the place was named Elsaffen or Elsava. The name Elsenfeld is only confirmed as far back as 1625.

== History ==
The area around Elsenfeld was already settled more than 5,000 years ago. This is witnessed by Linear Pottery culture (Bronze Age) burial finds near Eichelsbach and Rück-Schippach. However, there likely was no continuous habitation before Frankish times.

Barrows near Eichelsbach bear witness to a relatively dense population in the time between 1600 and 700 BC. Only in the late 6th century AD did the actual era of written history begin here.

The oldest settlements in today's municipal area are Eichelsbach and Schippach. In 1122, Elsenfeld had its first documentary mention. Schippach's first documentary mention came in 1233, when the Count and Countess of Rieneck expanded the Himmelthal Monastery's landholdings with estates around Schippach. Rück came to light for the first time about 1270 in the so-called Mainzer Heberolle ("Mainz Levy Roll" – a taxation document). In the mid 13th century, all these places appeared in the Koppelfutter-Verzeichnis ("Paddock Fodder Directory"). Eichelsbach (also then known as Egilespach, Aigilspach or Egilspach) was leibeigen – in serfdom.

The area's prince was the Archbishop and Elector of Mainz. The resident lords were therefore enfeoffed by Electoral Mainz.

Until the 1803 Reichsdeputationshauptschluss, the community's development was tightly bound to Klingenberg castle, town, court, Amt and stewardship holdings. In 1803, the area became part of the Principality of Aschaffenburg. In 1804, Elsenfeld passed to the Grand Duchy of Frankfurt and was transferred into the ownership if the Kingdom of Bavaria in 1814. Eichelsbach and the remaining Himmelthal monastic landholdings were delivered from serfdom and socage.

On 30 July 1828, Elsenfeld was separated from the Klingenberg district court and assigned to the Obernburg district court, with which it remained until Gebietsreform (district reform) in 1972.

On 1 July 1971, the formerly self-administering communities of Rück-Schippach and Eichelsbach voluntarily amalgamated with the market community of Elsenfeld.

== Demographics ==
=== Population development ===
Within town limits, 6,908 inhabitants were counted in 1970, 7,370 in 1987 and in 2000 8,744. In 2006, Elsenfeld welcomed its 9,000th inhabitant.

=== Religion ===
The inhabitants are overwhelmingly Catholic.

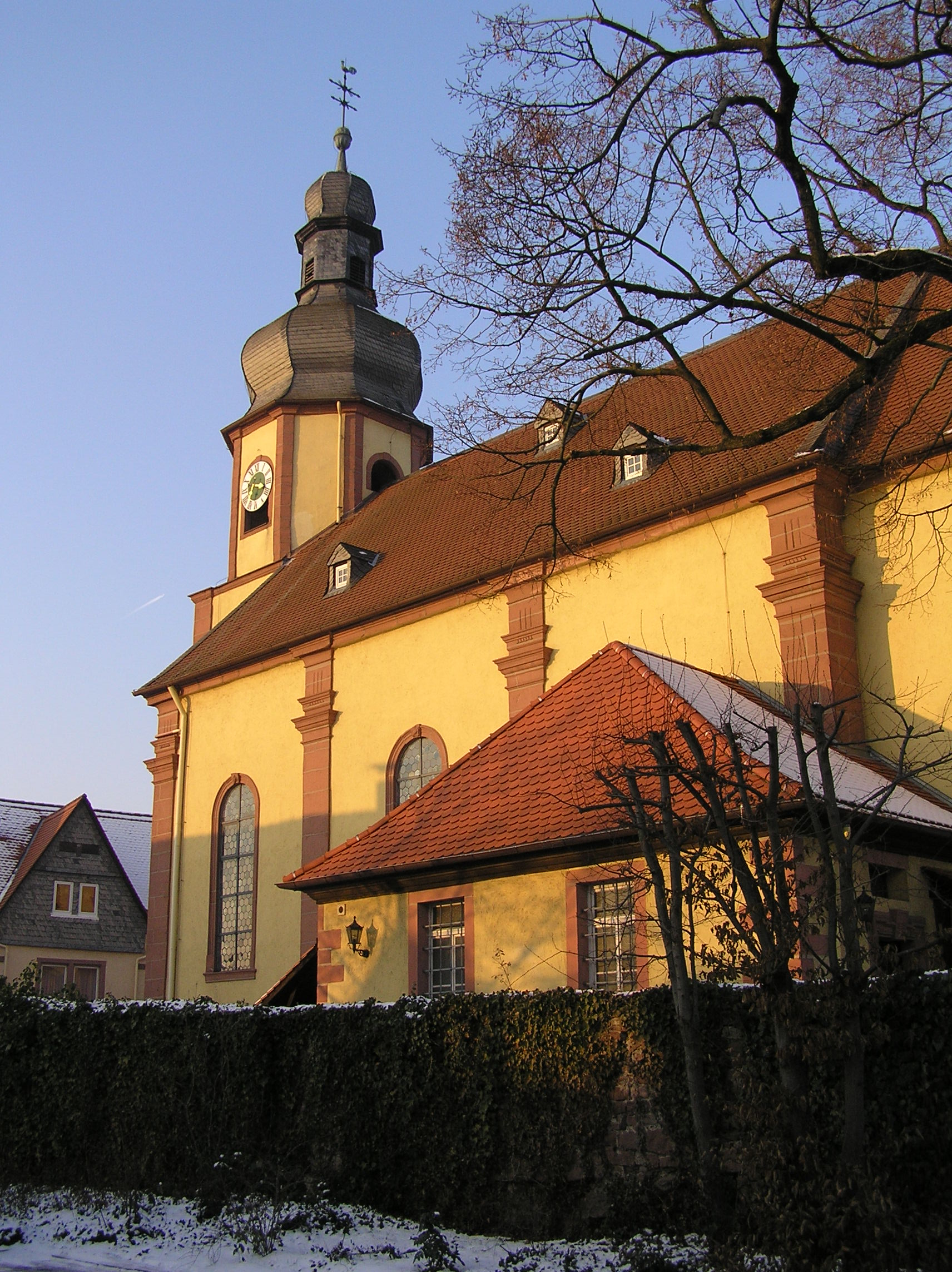
Old parish church

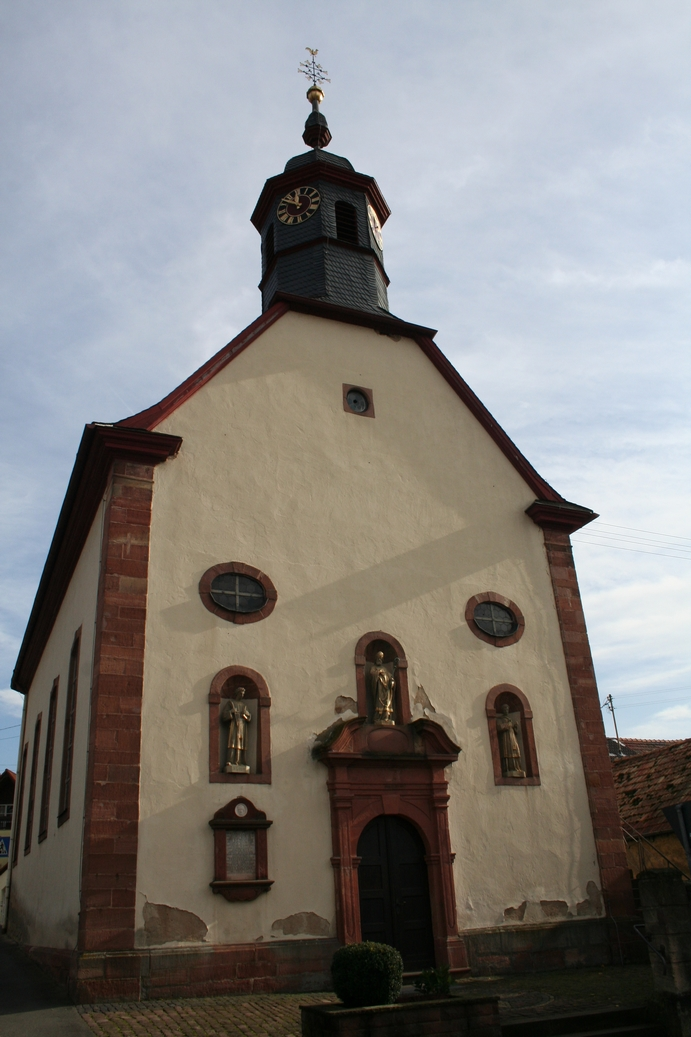
Johanneskirche ("Saint John's Church")

== Economy ==
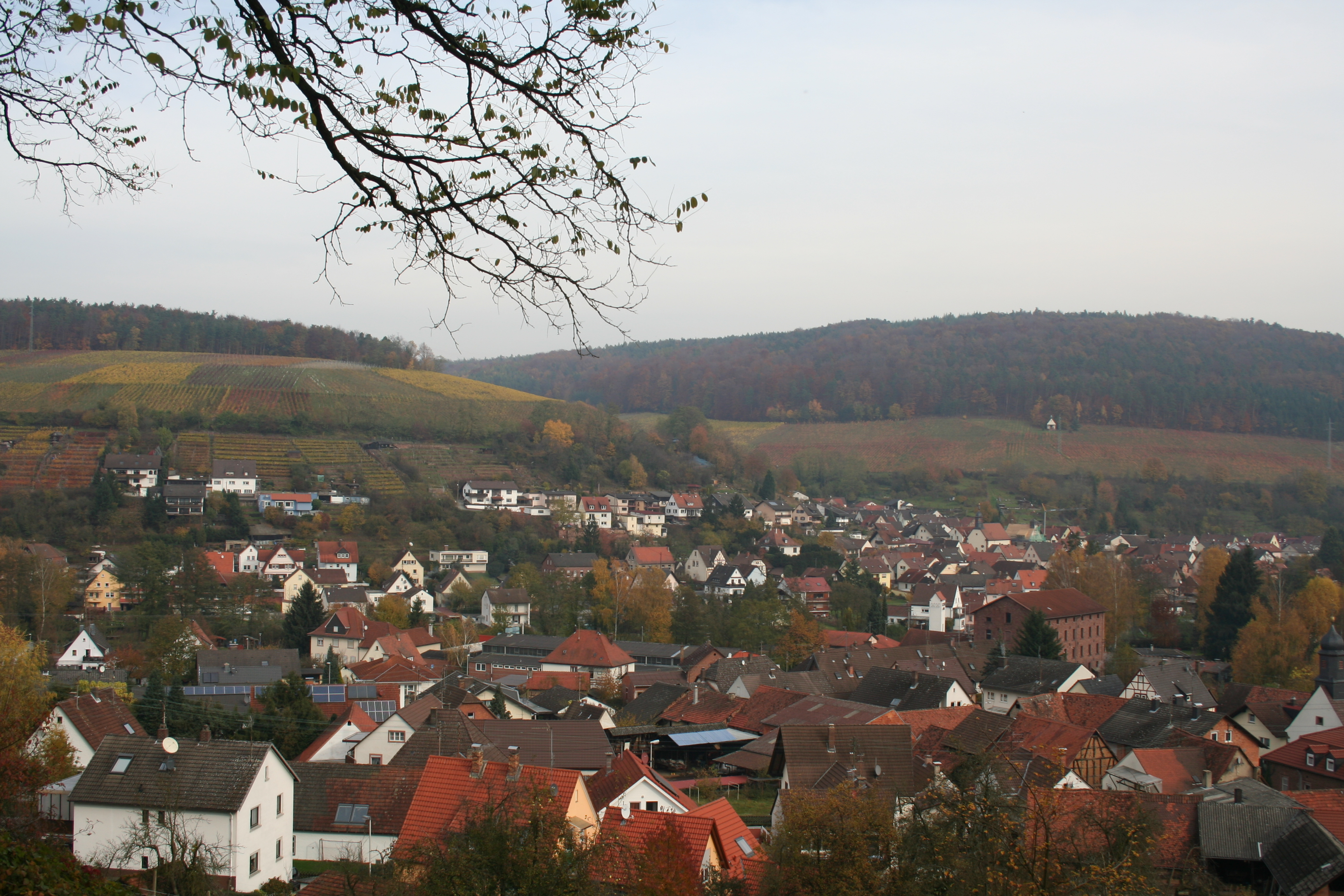
Rück-Schippach with the Rücker Schalk winegrowing area

According to official statistics, there were 999 workers on the social welfare contribution rolls working in producing businesses in 1998. In trade and transport this was 0. In other areas, 498 workers on the social welfare contribution rolls were employed, and 3,157 such workers worked from home. There were 0 processing businesses. Eight businesses were in construction, and furthermore, in 1999, there were 34 agricultural operations with a working area of 678 ha, of which 504 ha was cropland and 157 ha was meadowland.

Municipal taxes in 1999 amounted to €5,059,000 (converted), of which net business taxes amounted to €1,522,000.

In the outlying centre of Rück lies a winegrowing area for Frankenwein with the appellation Rücker Schalk.

=== Industrial park ===
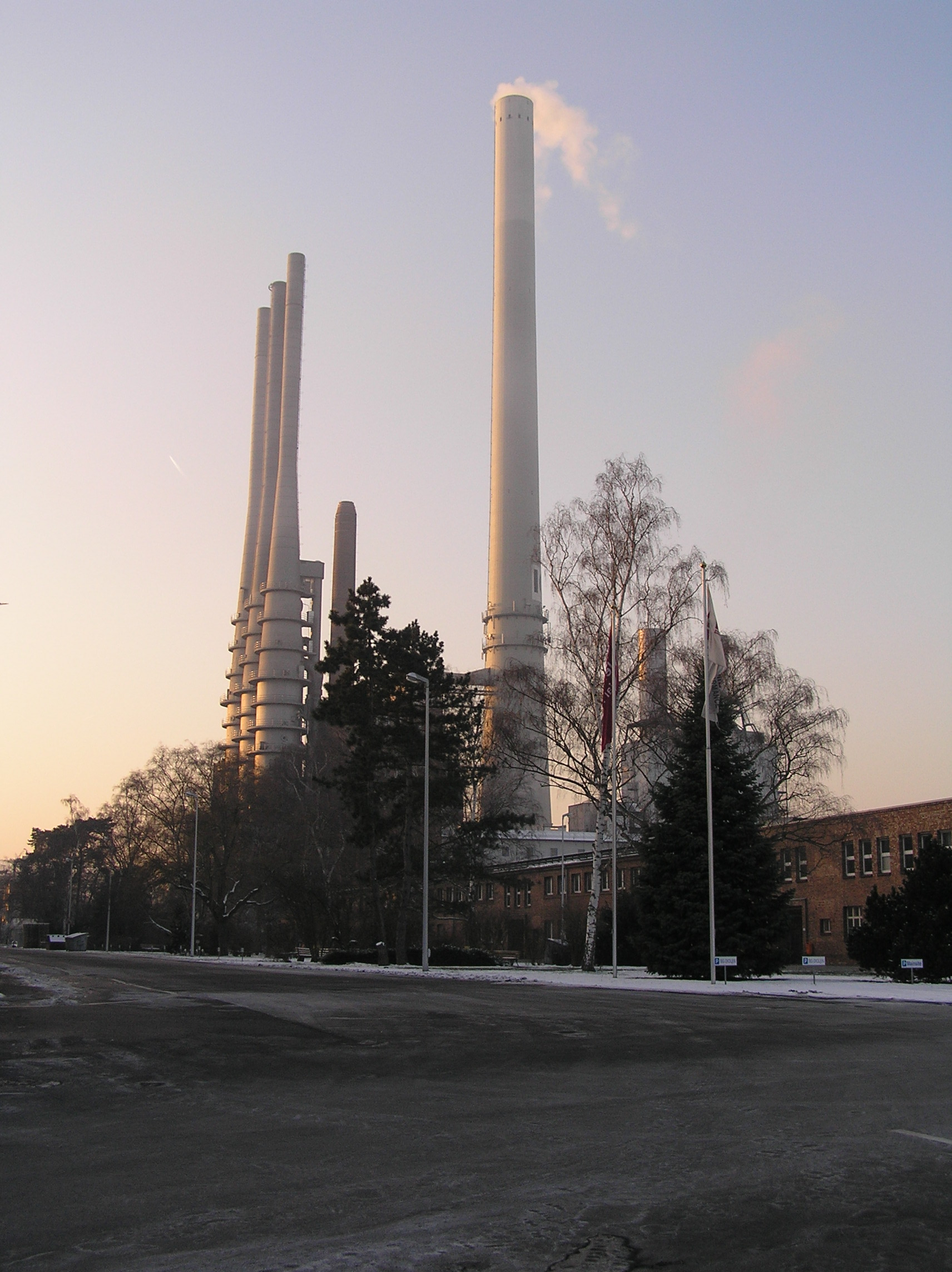
Industrie Center Obernburg

Partly within Elsenfeld's limits lies an industrial park called the Industrie Center Obernburg (ICO); although it is also locally known as "Glanzstoff", after the former owners, Vereinigte Glanzstoff-Fabriken AG. There, in line with tradition, various kinds of chemical fibres are produced. Moreover, the industrial park is home to many other, smaller businesses in various fields. Although the industrial park bears the name Obernburg, and this is also the postal address, it lies exclusively within the communities of Erlenbach am Main and Elsenfeld.

== Government ==
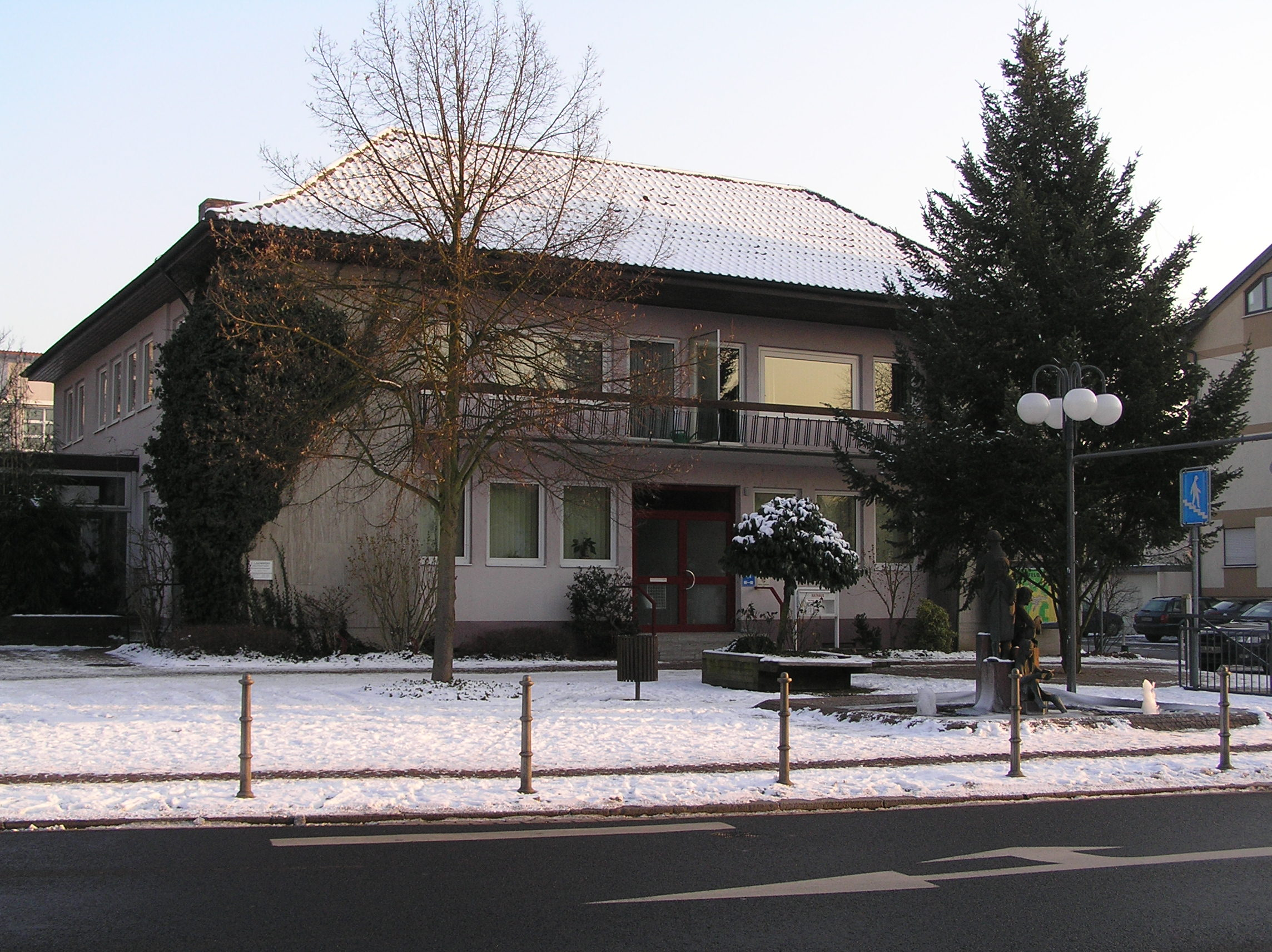
Town hall

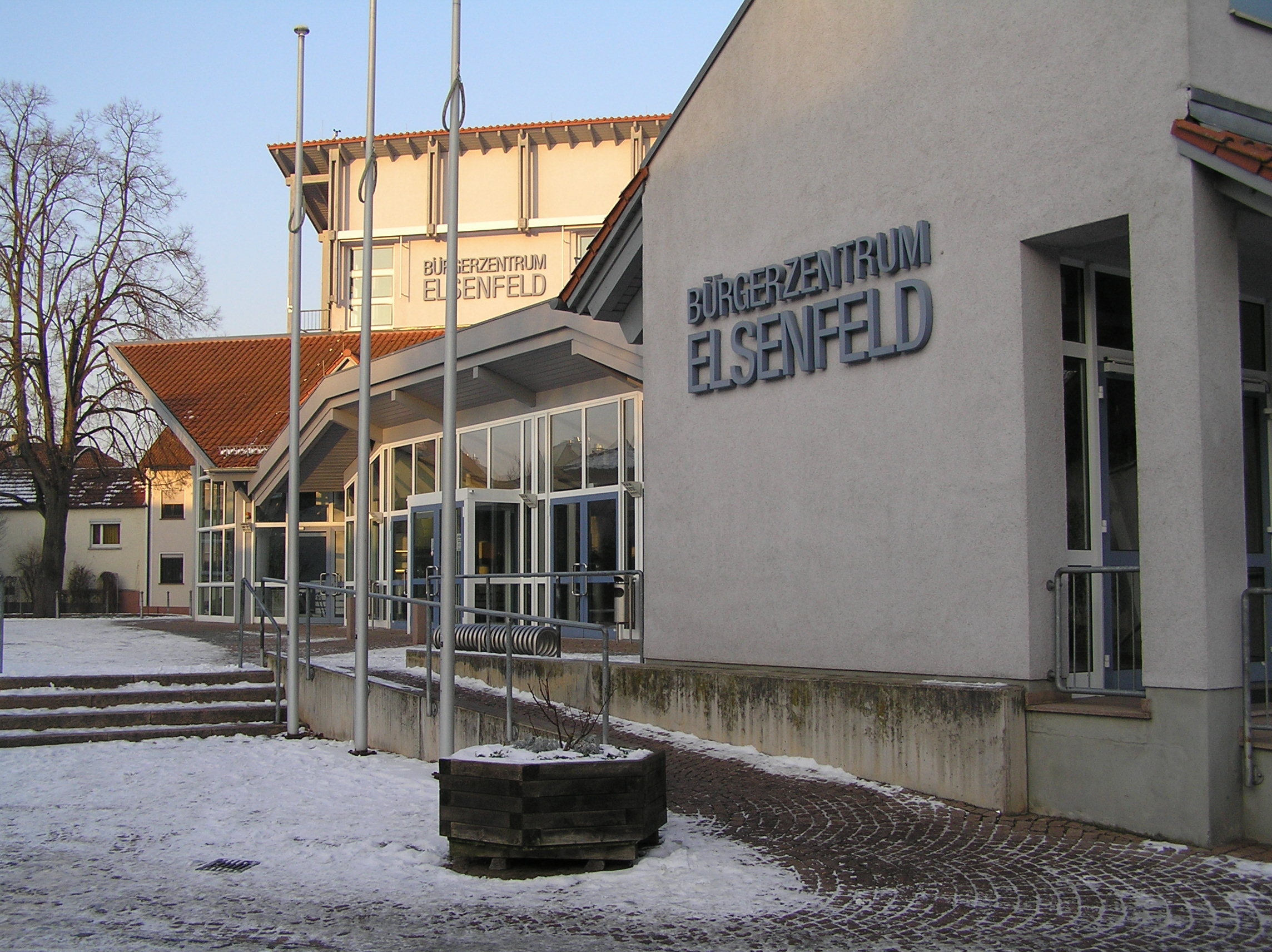
Civic centre

=== Mayor and community council ===
On 14 March 2020, Kai Hohmann (CSU) was elected mayor. The deputies are second mayor Berthold Oberle (UBV) and third mayor Anna Becker (SPD).

Council seats are apportioned thus:

- CSU: 8 seats
- UBV: 7 seats
- SPD: 5 seats

=== Town twinning ===
- Condé-sur-Noireau, Calvados, France since 28 May 2005

=== Coat of arms ===
The community's arms might be described thus: Per pale, dexter gules a wheel spoked of six, in base a bend wavy argent, sinister of the second a mount, thereon an alder tree vert.

The alder in the arms is known locally as an Elsenbaum and stands for the first two syllables. The wavy fess stands for the community's geographical location on the local brook, the Elsava, and at the same time, it refers to the community's name, which is derived from the brook's. The wheel is the Wheel of Mainz; it, along with the tinctures argent and gules (silver and red), refers to Electoral Mainz's former hegemony in this part of Germany.

The arms have been borne since 1954.

== Arts and culture ==
=== Library ===
There is a municipal library with some 22,700 media.

== Attractions ==
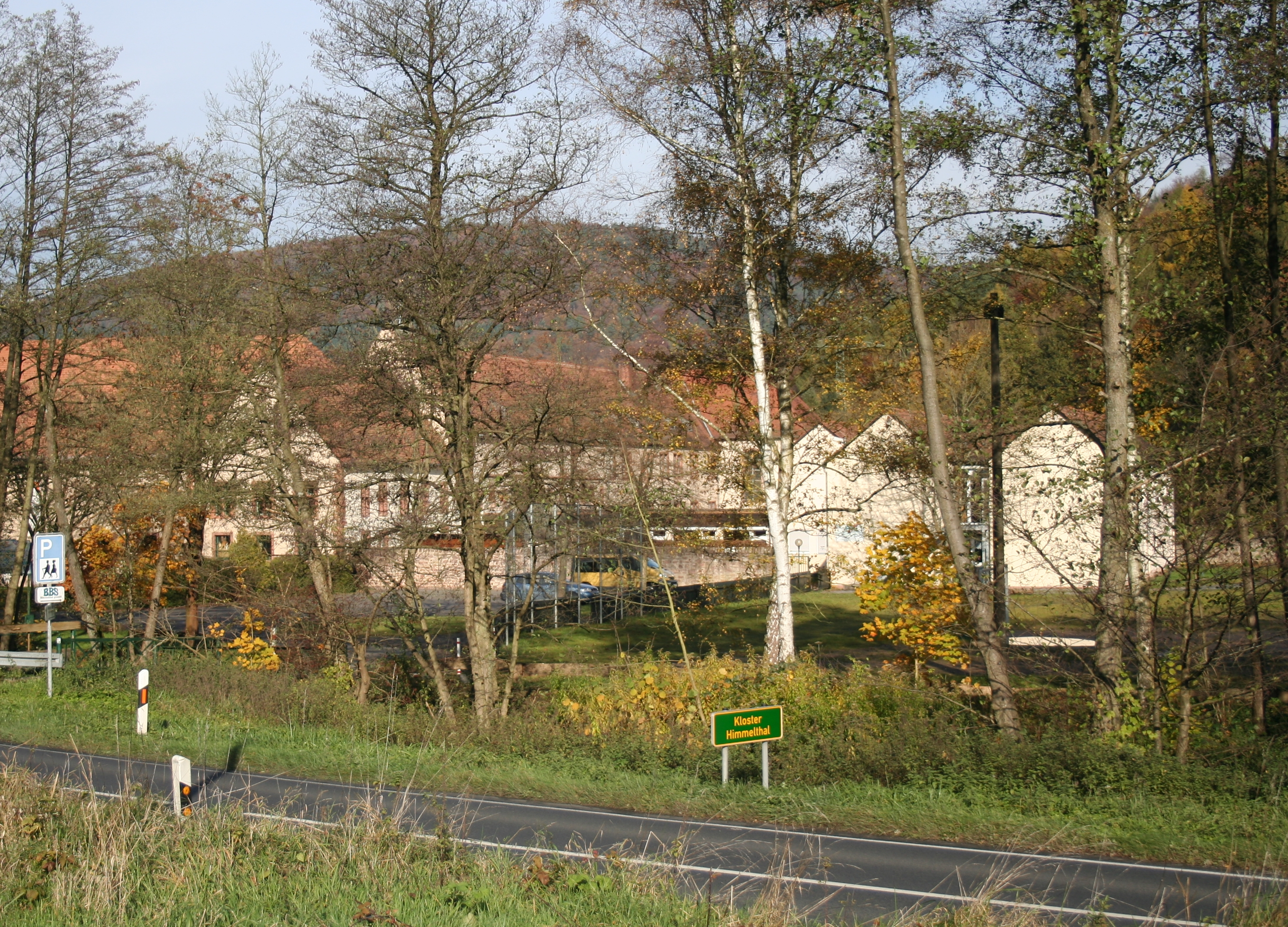
Himmelthal monastery

=== Kloster Himmelthal ===
For 15 years the Himmelthaler Sommerkonzerte have been staged at the church of Kloster Himmelthal (Himmelthal monastery). Furthermore, there is also Elsenfeld's and the Rück Winegrowers’ Association's wine-sampling parlour at the monastery.

=== Hiking paths ===
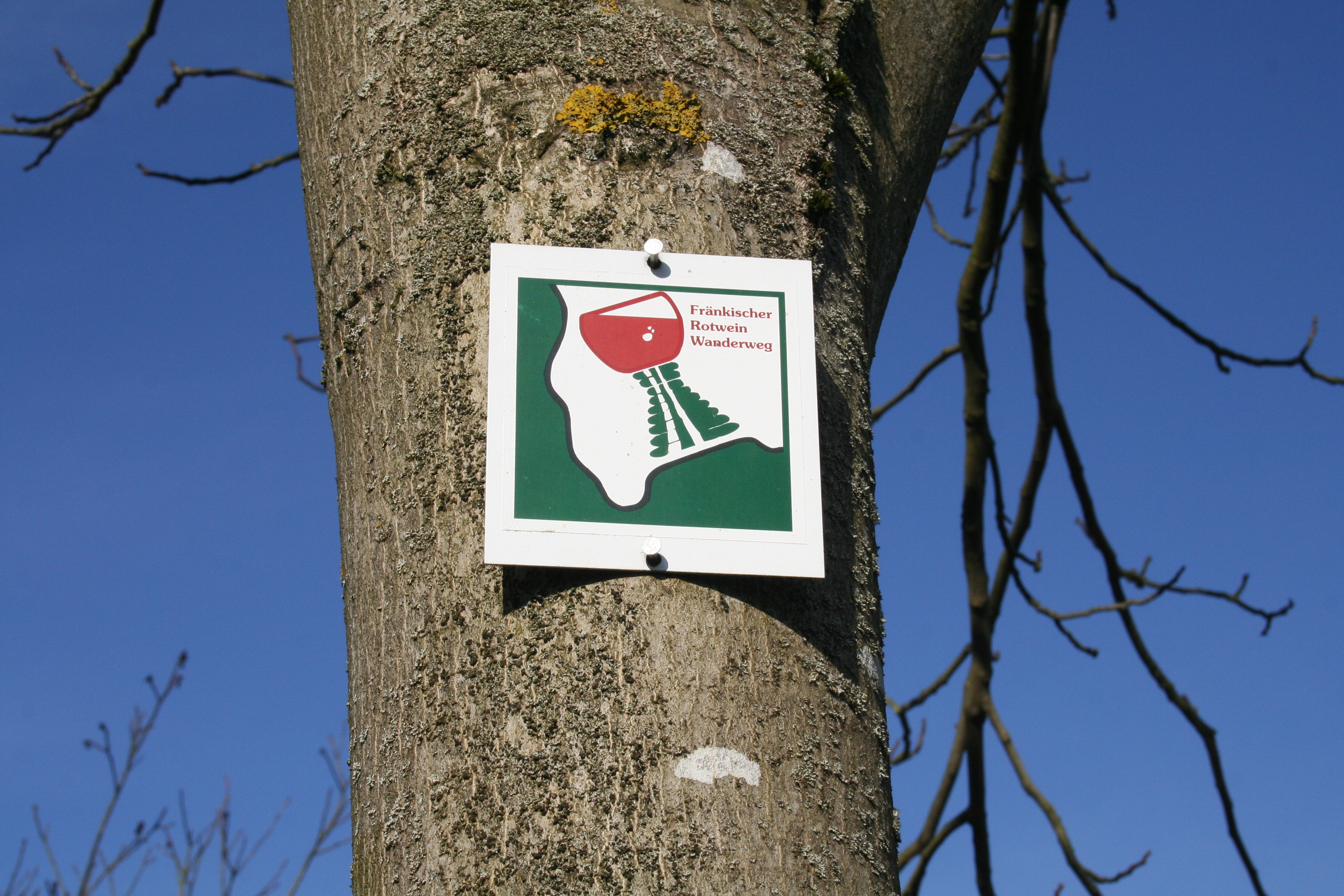
The signage along the Franconian Red Wine Hiking Path

Elsenfeld is located on the long-distance hiking trail Fränkischer Rotwein Wanderweg ("Franconian Red Wine Hiking Path"), established in 1990.

== Infrastructure ==
=== Transport ===
==== Rail ====
Elsenfeld features a railway station, run by Deutsche Bahn AG as Bahnhof Obernburg-Elsenfeld, though it is actually on the Elsenfeld side of the Main. From there run regional services on the Maintalbahn to Aschaffenburg and Miltenberg. The Obernburg-Elsenfeld–Heimbuchenthal railway line was closed by 1978, and has been largely converted into a bicycle path.

==== Road ====
Elsenfeld lies right at the Obernburg am Main interchange of Bundesstraße 469.

=== Leisure ===
==== Leisure pool ====
In 2001, the indoor swimming pool was renovated and reopened as the Elsavamar Leisure Pool. The pool contains a 25 m basin with a non-swimmer area as well as a water and rock playing area for young children. In the foyer and the bathing area is a cafeteria. A sunroom with access to the leisure area and to the sunbathing field is inviting to those who want to unwind. In November 2007, a sauna was opened.

==== Beach and leisure facility ====
On 30 April 2000 in the former outdoor swimming pool property, Northern Bavaria's biggest multifunctional beach sport facility with six beach volleyball courts was opened. In the former diving basin, a skating facility with a halfpipe, a 450 m^{2} wetland biotope, an integrated festival square with a bowls area, a badminton and streetball court, table tennis tables, big chessboards, a music pavilion and in the former wading pool a water and adventure playground for children up to ten years old were built.

== Education ==
Elsenfeld offers roughly 400 Kindergarten places.

=== Schools ===
- Mozart-Volksschule (primary school)
- Georg-Keimel-Volksschule (Hauptschule)
- Staatliche Realschule Elsenfeld, roughly 1000 students
- Julius-Echter-Gymnasium (language Gymnasium, economics and social sciences Gymnasium with social science profile), roughly 950 students

=== Special schools ===
- Elsavaschule for educational help with holistic-pedagogical daycare centre, Himmelthal Monastery
- Richard-Galmbacher-Schule (Special education school with focus on mental development)
- Janusz-Korczak-Schule (school for help with learning)
- Blindeninstitutsstiftung Außenstelle Elsenfeld (school for the blind – branch location)

== Notable people ==
- Daniel Haas, football goalkeeper, b. 1 August 1983
- Anja Kohl, TV journalist and newscaster
- Joachim Spatz, chairman of the Lower Franconian FDP and former Member of the Landtag, b. 5 January 1964
- Heidemarie Wright, SPD Member of the Bundestag, b. 20 February 1951
