= Miltenberg (district) =

Coordinates: 49°45′N 9°15′E

- District
- Flag Coat of arms
- Country: Germany
- State: Bavaria
- Adm. region: Lower Franconia
- Capital: Miltenberg

Government
  - District admin.: Jens Marco Scherf (Greens)

Area
  - Total: 716 km^{2} (276 sq mi)

Population (31 December 2025)
  - Total: 126,746
  - Density: 177/km^{2} (458/sq mi)
- Time zone: UTC+01:00 (CET)
  - Summer (DST): UTC+02:00 (CEST)
- Vehicle registration: MIL, OBB
- Website: landkreis-miltenberg.de

Miltenberg (German: [ˈmɪltn̩ˌbɛʁk]) is a Landkreis (district) in Bavaria, Germany. It is bounded by (from the north and clockwise) the city of Aschaffenburg, the districts of Aschaffenburg and Main-Spessart, and the states of Baden-Württemberg (districts of Main-Tauber and Neckar-Odenwald) and Hesse (districts of Odenwaldkreis and Darmstadt-Dieburg).

== History ==
During the Middle Ages there was continuous fighting between the Archbishop of Mainz and the Counts of Rieneck. Both attempted to rule the region and erected castles in the Spessart hills. Later other small fiefs became involved in these fights as well.

During the 13th century the towns along the river Main emerged. As a result of the trade on the river, their wealth grew, and this became a very prosperous region. Prosperity ended abruptly in the Thirty Years' War, when the area was devastated and depopulated.

In 1803, the ecclesial states of Germany were dissolved, among them the Archbishopric of Mainz. By 1816, the Kingdom of Bavaria had annexed the entire region.

The district of Miltenberg was established in 1972 by merging the former districts of Miltenberg and Obernburg.

== Geography ==
The district is located in a hilly area on both banks of the river Main. On the western bank the Odenwald hills are rising, and on the eastern bank lies the Spessart range.

== Economy ==
In 2017 (latest data available) the GDP per inhabitant was €34,833. This places the district 52nd out of 96 districts (rural and urban) in Bavaria (overall average: €46,698).

== Coat of arms ==
The district's coat of arms might be described thus: Gules a pallet wavy argent, dexter a wheel spoked of six of the same, sinister dancetty of three of the first and second, a chief bendy lozengy argent and azure. The coat of arms displays:

- the blue and silver tilted diamond pattern ("bendy lozengy") of Bavaria's flag in the chief (band at the top)
- a silver wheel, the Wheel of Mainz, symbolising the Archbishopric of Mainz
- a wavy pallet (narrow vertical stripe), symbolising the Main
- three silver points over a red field, the "Franconian Rake", symbolising the Prince-Bishopric of Würzburg

== Towns and municipalities ==
Clickable map of towns and municipalities in the district

Towns
1. Amorbach
2. Erlenbach am Main
3. Klingenberg am Main
4. Miltenberg
5. Obernburg
6. Wörth am Main
Märkte
1. Elsenfeld
2. Eschau
3. Großheubach
4. Kirchzell
5. Schneeberg
6. Sulzbach am Main
7. Weilbach
Municipalities
1. Collenberg
2. Dorfprozelten
3. Eichenbühl
4. Faulbach
5. Großwallstadt
6. Leidersbach
7. Mömlingen
8. Niedernberg

Verwaltungsgemeinschaften
1. Erftal; 1. Bürgstadt^{1,3}; 2. Neunkirchen; 2. Kleinheubach; 1. Kleinheubach^{1,3}; 2. Laudenbach; 3. Rüdenau	3. Kleinwallstadt; 1. Hausen; 2. Kleinwallstadt^{1,3}; 4. Mönchberg; 1. Mönchberg^{1,3}; 2. Röllbach	5. Stadtprozelten; 1. Altenbuch; 2. Stadtprozelten^{1,2}
^{1}seat of the Verwaltungsgemeinschaft; ^{2}town; ^{3}Markt
