= Stadtprozelten (Verwaltungsgemeinschaft) =

- Verwaltungsgemeinschaft
- Location of Stadtprozelten within Miltenberg district
- Interactive map of Stadtprozelten
- Location within Germany Location within Bavaria
- Coordinates: 49°48′N 9°25′E
- Country: Germany
- State: Bavaria
- Admin. region: Lower Franconia
- District: Miltenberg
- Seat: Stadtprozelten
- Subdivisions: 2 municipalities

Area
  - Total: 48.51 km^{2} (18.73 sq mi)

Population (2025-12-31)
  - Total: 2,754
  - Density: 56.77/km^{2} (147.0/sq mi)
- Time zone: UTC+01:00 (CET)
  - Summer (DST): UTC+02:00 (CEST)

Stadtprozelten is a Verwaltungsgemeinschaft (municipal association) in the district of Miltenberg in Bavaria, Germany. Its seat is in Stadtprozelten.

It consists of the following municipalities:

1. Altenbuch
2. Stadtprozelten
