= Himmelthal Abbey =

Coordinates: 49.8222°N 9.2194°E

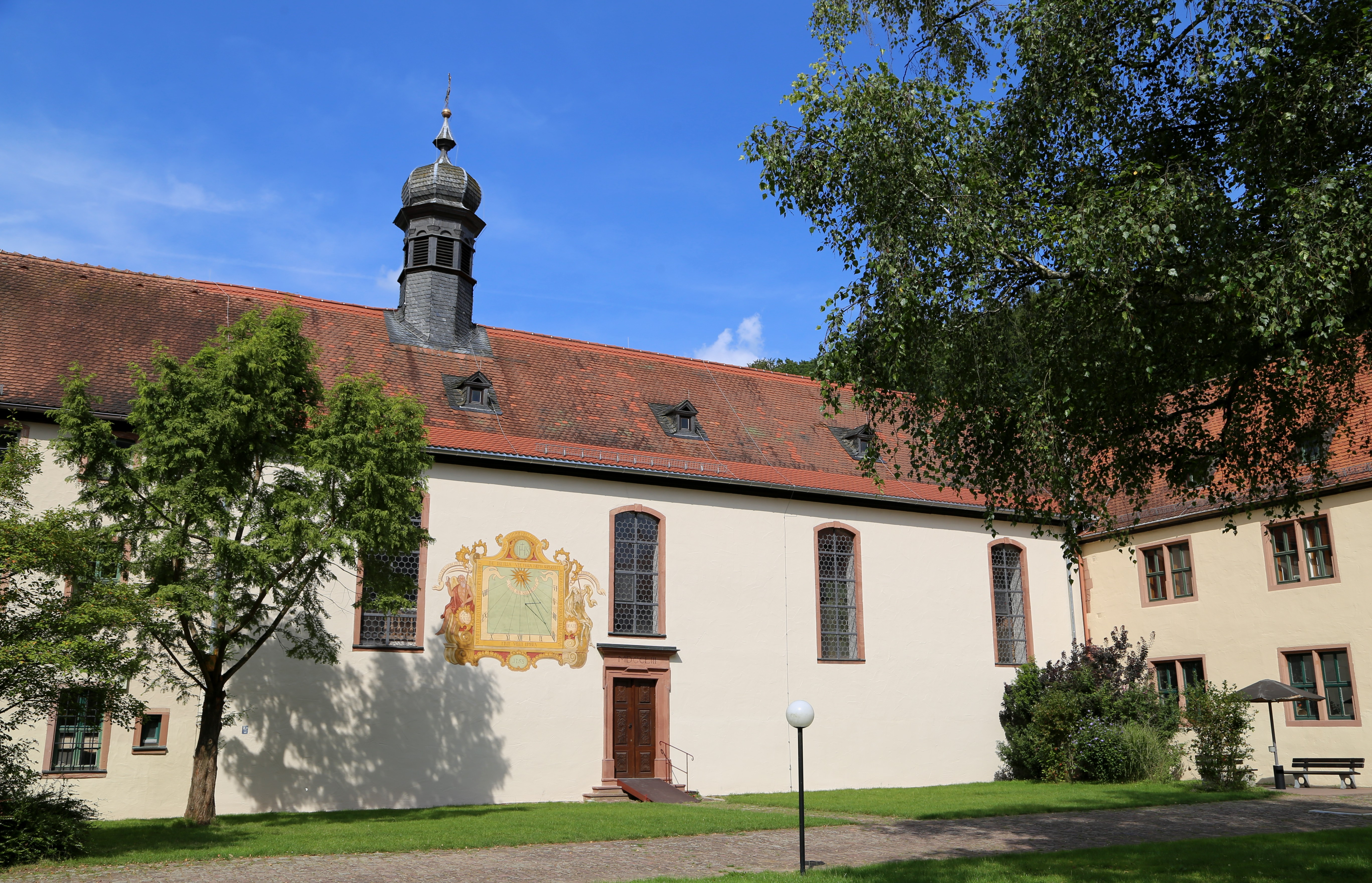
Elsenfeld; Former Cistercian nunnery 1232–1567

Himmelthal Abbey (German: Kloster Himmelthal) was a Cistercian nunnery in Elsenfeld in Bavaria. It was founded by 1232 by Count Ludwig II von Rieneck and his wife Adelheid von Henneberg. It had ceased to function by 1568, when the Archbishopric of Mainz dissolved it and used the premises as a Kameralhof (finance office). It was then used by the Jesuits from 1595 and formally passed to them in 1626. After the German Jesuits were dissolved in 1773, the estate reverted to the Archbishopric of Mainz, which assigned it to an educational establishment. Since 1814 it has been owned by the Gymnasiumsfonds des Stiftungsamtes Aschaffenburg. Some 18th-century panels showing the organisation's holdings are now in the Stiftsmuseum of Aschaffenburg.

== See also ==
- List of Jesuit sites
