= Altenbuch =

- Municipality
- Coat of arms

- Location of Altenbuch within Miltenberg district
- Interactive map of Altenbuch
- Location within Germany Location within Bavaria
- Coordinates: 49°50′N 9°25′E
- Country: Germany
- State: Bavaria
- Admin. region: Lower Franconia
- District: Miltenberg
- Municipal assoc.: Stadtprozelten

Area
  - Total: 37.64 km^{2} (14.53 sq mi)
- Elevation: 240 m (790 ft)

Population (2025-12-31)
  - Total: 1,212
  - Density: 32.20/km^{2} (83.40/sq mi)
- Time zone: UTC+01:00 (CET)
  - Summer (DST): UTC+02:00 (CEST)
- Postal codes: 97901
- Dialling codes: 09392
- Vehicle registration: MIL
- Website: www.altenbuch.de

Altenbuch (German pronunciation: [altn̩ˈbuːχ]) is a municipality in the Miltenberg district in the Regierungsbezirk of Lower Franconia (Unterfranken) in Bavaria, Germany and a member of the Verwaltungsgemeinschaft (municipal association) of Stadtprozelten. Altenbuch has around 1,200 inhabitants.

== Geography ==
=== Location ===
Altenbuch lies in the Bavarian Lower Main (Bayerischer Untermain) region in the Spessart (range).

=== Subdivisions ===
The community has the following Gemarkungen (traditional rural cadastral areas): Altenbucher Forst, Oberaltenbuch, Unteraltenbuch, Altenbucher Leibstuhl.

== History ==
Oberaltenbuch (formerly belonging to the Grünau Charterhouse) was mediatized in 1806 into the Principality of Aschaffenburg. Unteraltenbuch (belonging to Electoral Mainz) passed in the Reichsdeputationshauptschluss to Prince Primate von Dalberg's Principality of Aschaffenburg. After the Treaties of Paris in 1814, Oberaltenbuch and Unteraltenbuch belonged to the Kingdom of Bavaria. In the course of administrative reform in Bavaria, the communities of Oberaltenbuch and Unteraltenbuch came into being with the Gemeindeedikt ("Municipal Edict") of 1818.

On 1 April 1938, the two communities were merged into the one community of Altenbuch.

=== Religion ===
Altenbuch formerly belonged to the Catholic parish of Dorfprozelten and only became a parish in its own right about 1760. Saint Wolfgang's Church was built in 1770 in the Baroque style and was converted and expanded several times.

== Demographics ==
Within town limits were counted:

- 1970: 1,090 inhabitants
- 1987: 1,224 "
- 2000: 1,332 "

== Governance ==
=== Coat of arms ===
The community's arms might be described thus: Per pale dexter argent a Latin cross sable, sinister vert the same of the first, in base an oakleaf palewise counterchanged.

The community was formed out of two formerly separate ones in 1938, and it is for these that the two crosses stand. The Teutonic Knights’s cross on the dexter (armsbearer’s right, viewer’s left) side refers to that order’s commandry of Prozelten, which had holdings in Unteraltenbuch from 1317 onwards, and by 1329 was exercising blood court rights in this part of the commandry. In 1484, the commandry passed to the Archbishopric of Mainz and stayed in its ownership until the Old Empire came to an end in 1803. The silver cross on the sinister (armsbearer’s left, viewer’s right) side is taken from the arms formerly borne by the Charterhouse of Grünau and recalls the Charterhouse’s lordship in Oberaltenbuch beginning in 1657. The Charterhouse was founded by Elisabeth von Hohenlohe and dissolved at Secularization in 1803. The oakleaf represents the community’s geographical location in the Spessart and at the same time refers to Unteraltenbuch’s long tradition of forestry. From the late 15th century the place was the seat of one of the six “riding foresters”; from the late 17th century the district forester had his seat here. Even after being transferred to Bavaria, the forester's office stayed in Unteraltenbuch.

The arms have been borne since 1973.

== Economy ==
According to official statistics, there were 22 workers on the social welfare contribution rolls working in agriculture and forestry in 1998. In producing businesses this was 116, and in trade and transport 13. In other areas, 19 workers on the social welfare contribution rolls were employed, and 532 such workers worked from home. There was 1 businesses each in processing (including mining and quarrying) and construction, and furthermore, in 1999, there were 11 agricultural operations with a working area of 57 ha, of which 3 ha was cropland and 49 ha was meadowland.

Municipal taxes in 1999 amounted to €464,000 (converted), of which net business taxes amounted to €19,000.

== Education ==
In 1999 the following institutions existed in Altenbuch:

- Kindergartens: 50 places with 50 children
