= Collenberg =

- Municipality
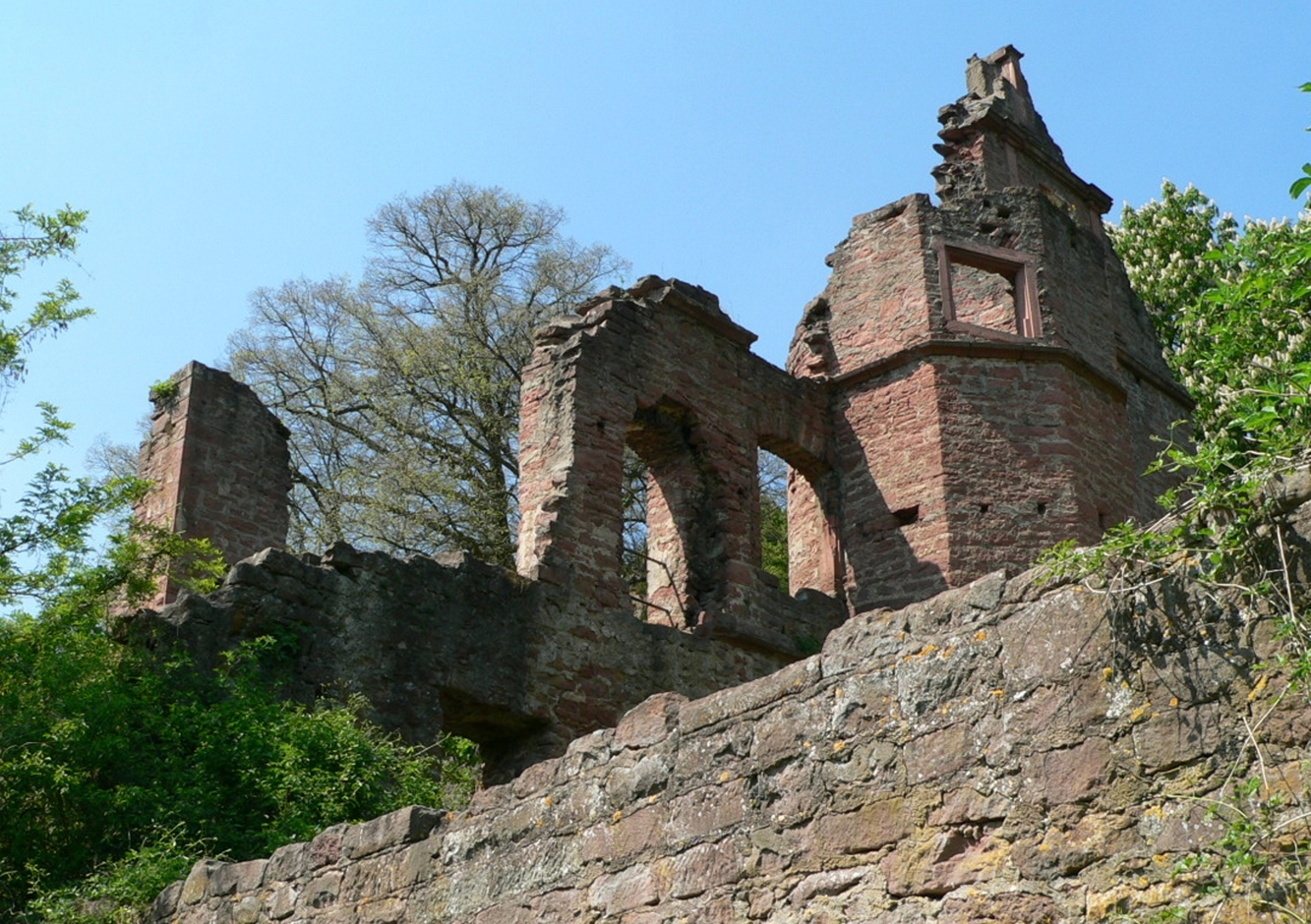
- Ruins of the Collenburg.

- Coat of arms

- Location of Collenberg within Miltenberg district
- Interactive map of Collenberg
- Location within Germany Location within Bavaria
- Coordinates: 49°46′N 09°20′E
- Country: Germany
- State: Bavaria
- Admin. region: Lower Franconia
- District: Miltenberg

Government
  - Mayor (2020–26): Andreas Freiburg

Area
  - Total: 25.66 km^{2} (9.91 sq mi)
- Elevation: 140 m (460 ft)

Population (2025-12-31)
  - Total: 2,448
  - Density: 95.40/km^{2} (247.1/sq mi)
- Time zone: UTC+01:00 (CET)
  - Summer (DST): UTC+02:00 (CEST)
- Postal codes: 97903
- Dialling codes: 09376 (Kirschfurt: 09375)
- Vehicle registration: MIL, OBB
- Website: www.collenberg-main.de

Collenberg (German pronunciation: [ˈkɔlənbɛʁk]) is a municipality in the Miltenberg district in the Regierungsbezirk of Lower Franconia (Unterfranken) in Bavaria, Germany. It has a population of about 2,400.

== Geography ==
=== Location ===
Collenberg lies on right bank of the Main, 13 km away from Miltenberg and 18 km from Wertheim. Along the Main between Collenberg and Freudenberg runs the boundary between Bavaria and Baden-Württemberg. Behind Collenberg lie the wooded hills of the Spessart.

=== Subdivisions ===
Collenberg's Ortsteile are Fechenbach, Reistenhausen and Kirschfurt.

== History ==
The community came into being in 1971 in the framework of municipal reform in Bavaria with the merger of the former communities of Fechenbach, Kirschfurt and Reistenhausen.

== Government ==
=== Community council ===
The council is made up of 14 council members, with the seats apportioned thus:

- CSU 8 seats
- FBC 3 seats
- SPD 3 seats

=== Coat of arms ===
The community's arms might be described thus: A fess wavy argent, in chief gules, dexter a wheel spoked of six and sinister a dog's head erased gorged sable with studs of the first, in base azure three maces, two and one, issuant palewise from the base.

The three maces come from the arms once borne by the Schenken of Klingenberg, former overlords who gave the castle its name after the founder of their line, whose name was Kolbo (and in German, the word for “mace” is Streitkolbe, or simply Kolbe), and are thus a canting charge. The wheel in the escutcheon’s upper half on the dexter (armsbearer’s right, viewer’s left) side is the Wheel of Mainz, and refers to the area’s long rule by Electoral Mainz, lasting until the Holy Roman Empire was at last dissolved in 1803. The dog’s head on the sinister (armsbearer’s left, viewer’s right) side is another canting charge. Although the usual word for “dog” in German is Hund, there is also the word Rüde, and thus this dog's head refers to the noble family of Rüdt von Collenberg. The wavy fesse symbolizes the local river, the Main.

The arms have been borne since 1973.

== Attractions ==
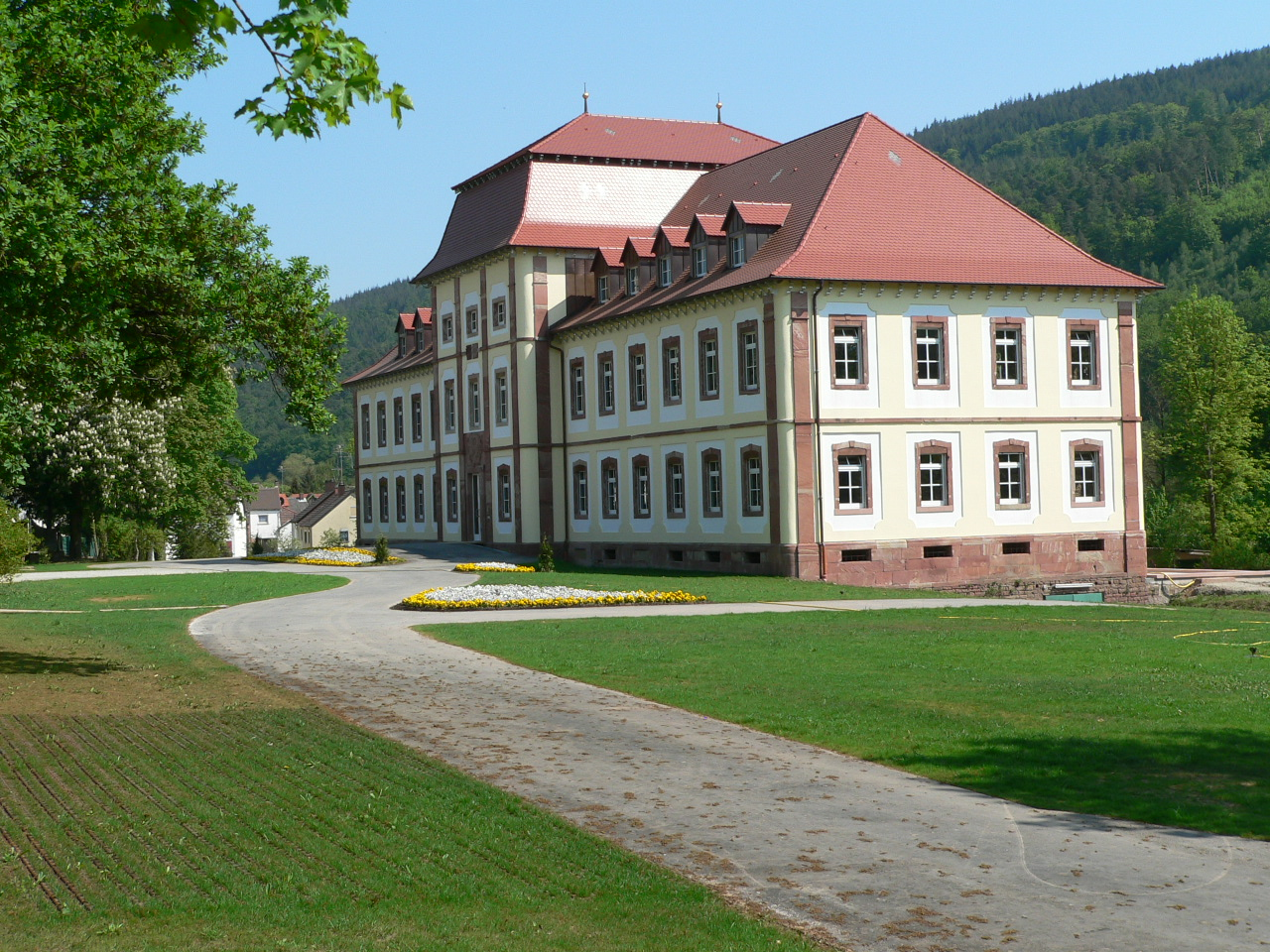
Schloss Fechenbach after restoration work in 2007

- Collenburg, ruined castle originally built by the noble family of Rüdt von Collenberg in 1250, about 1 km east of Fechenbach. It is located just outside the municipal territory of Collenberg, in Dorfprozelten
- Schloss Fechenbach (palace), built in 1750 by the Count of Reigersberg
- Memorial at Fechenbach's former synagogue, which was destroyed on Kristallnacht in 1938

== Infrastructure ==
=== Transport ===
On the other side of the Main runs Staatsstraße (State Road) 2310, which is linked in Kirschfurt with Collenberg's main road. This road leads east along the right bank of the Main to Hasloch.

== Education ==
- Kindergarten St. Martin with roughly 85 children
- Primary school
