= Elsava =

River in Germany

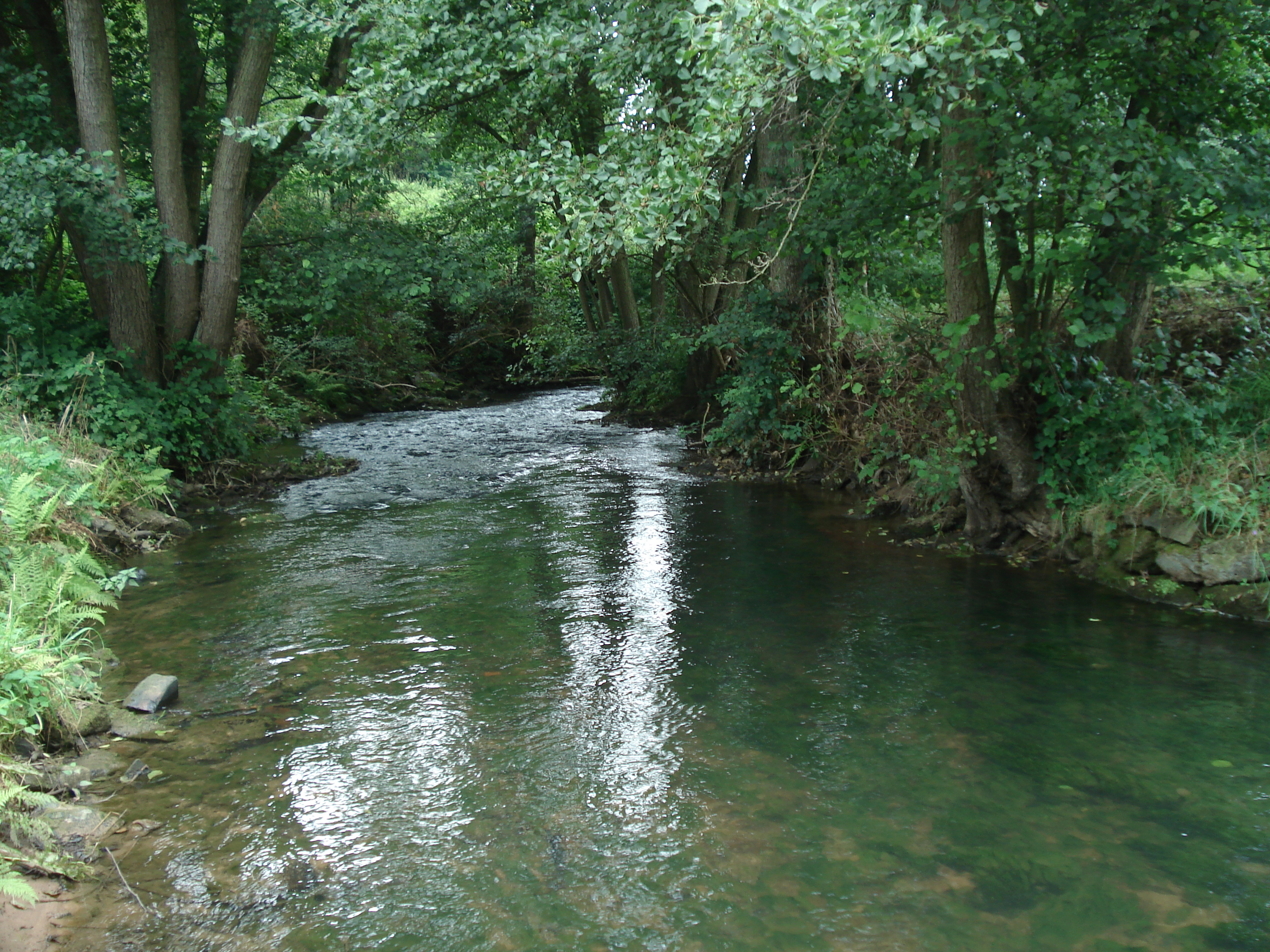
- Elsava near Elsenfeld

Location
- Country: Germany
- State: Bavaria

Physical characteristics
- Source
  - location: Elsavaquelle northeast of Hessenthal
  - coordinates: 49°55′46.26″N 09°19′02.29″E
- Mouth
  - location: Main, Elsenfeld
  - coordinates: 49.8444°N 9.1544°E
- Length: 27.3 km (17.0 mi)

Basin features
- Progression: Main→ Rhine→ North Sea

Elsava is a 27-kilometre-long (17 mi) right tributary of the Main in the administrative districts Aschaffenburg and Miltenberg in the Bavarian Spessart, Germany. It flows into the river Main in Elsenfeld. The short section upstream from Hessenthal to Mespelbrunn is called Kaltenbach.

== Name ==
The original name Elsapha is descended from the Old High German word Els for alder and the Indogermanic word Ap what meant water. As an explanation "watercourse surrounded by alders" arises from it. The river gave the municipality Elsenfeld the name. The river Aschaff flowing nearby (from Ascapha meaning "ash water") has also the same name origin.

== See also ==
- List of rivers of Bavaria
