= Grand Duchy of Frankfurt =

State

Coordinates: 50°7′N 8°41′E

Grand Duchy of Frankfurt Großherzogtum Frankfurt (German) Grand-duché de Francfort (French)
- 1810–1813
- Flag Coat of arms

- The Grand Duchy of Frankfurt (green) in 1812

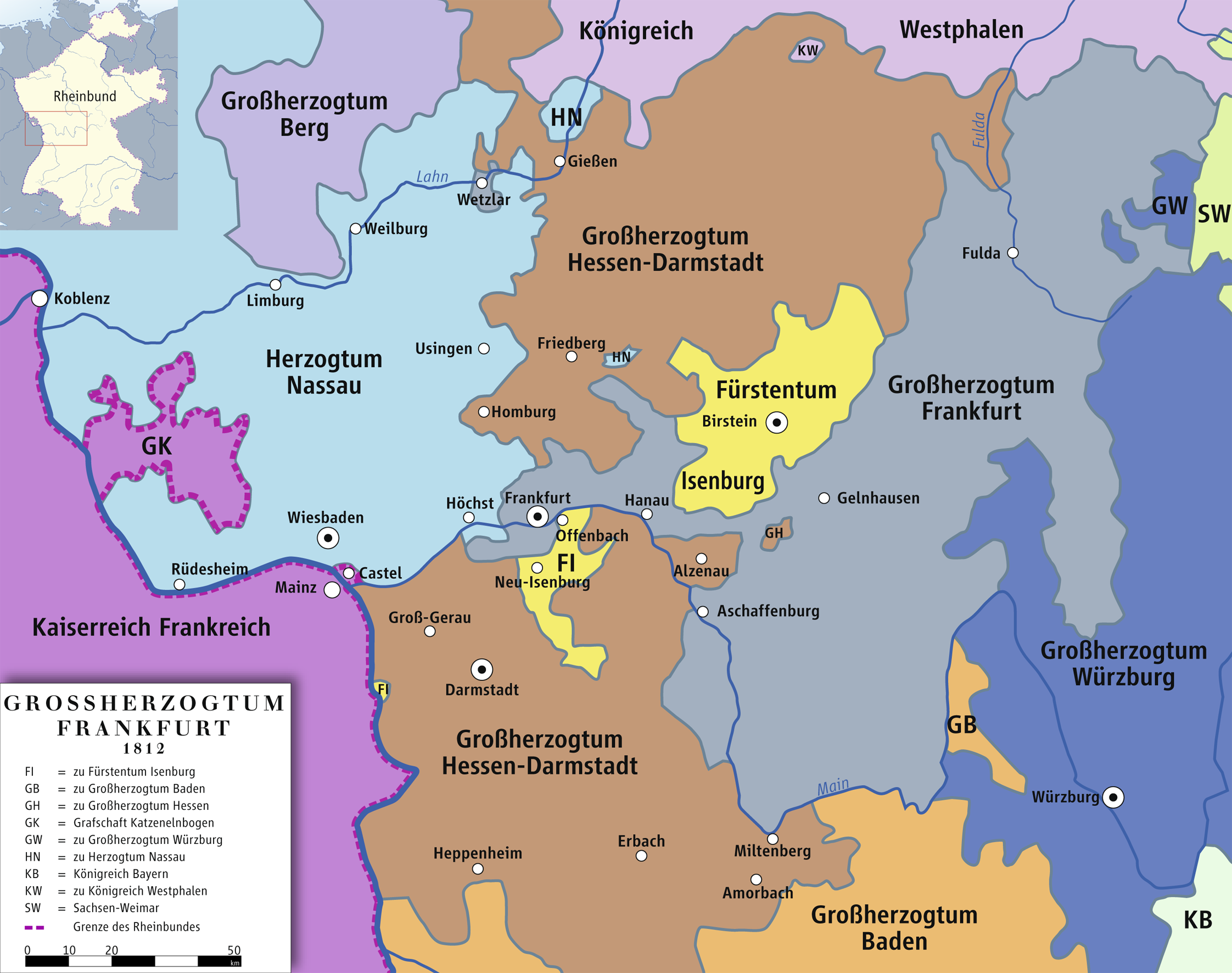
- The Grand Duchy of Frankfurt 1810-1813
- Status: Client state of the French Empire
- Capital: Aschaffenburg
- Government: Absolute monarchy
- Grand Duke
  - 1810–1813: Karl von Dalberg
  - 1813: Eugène de Beauharnais
- Historical era: Napoleonic Wars
  - Established: 16 February 1810
  - Disestablished: December 1813

Area
  - Total: 5,160 km^{2} (1,990 sq mi)

Population
- 302,000
Preceded by
Free City of Frankfurt
Principality of Aschaffenburg
Principality of Nassau-Orange-Fulda
Hesse-Hanau
Wetzlar
Succeeded by
Free City of Frankfurt
Kingdom of Bavaria
Grand Duchy of Hesse
Electorate of Hesse
Kingdom of Prussia
Saxe-Weimar-Eisenach

The Grand Duchy of Frankfurt was a German satellite state of Napoleonic creation. It came into existence in 1810 through the combination of the former territories of the Archbishopric of Mainz along with the Free City of Frankfurt itself.

== History ==
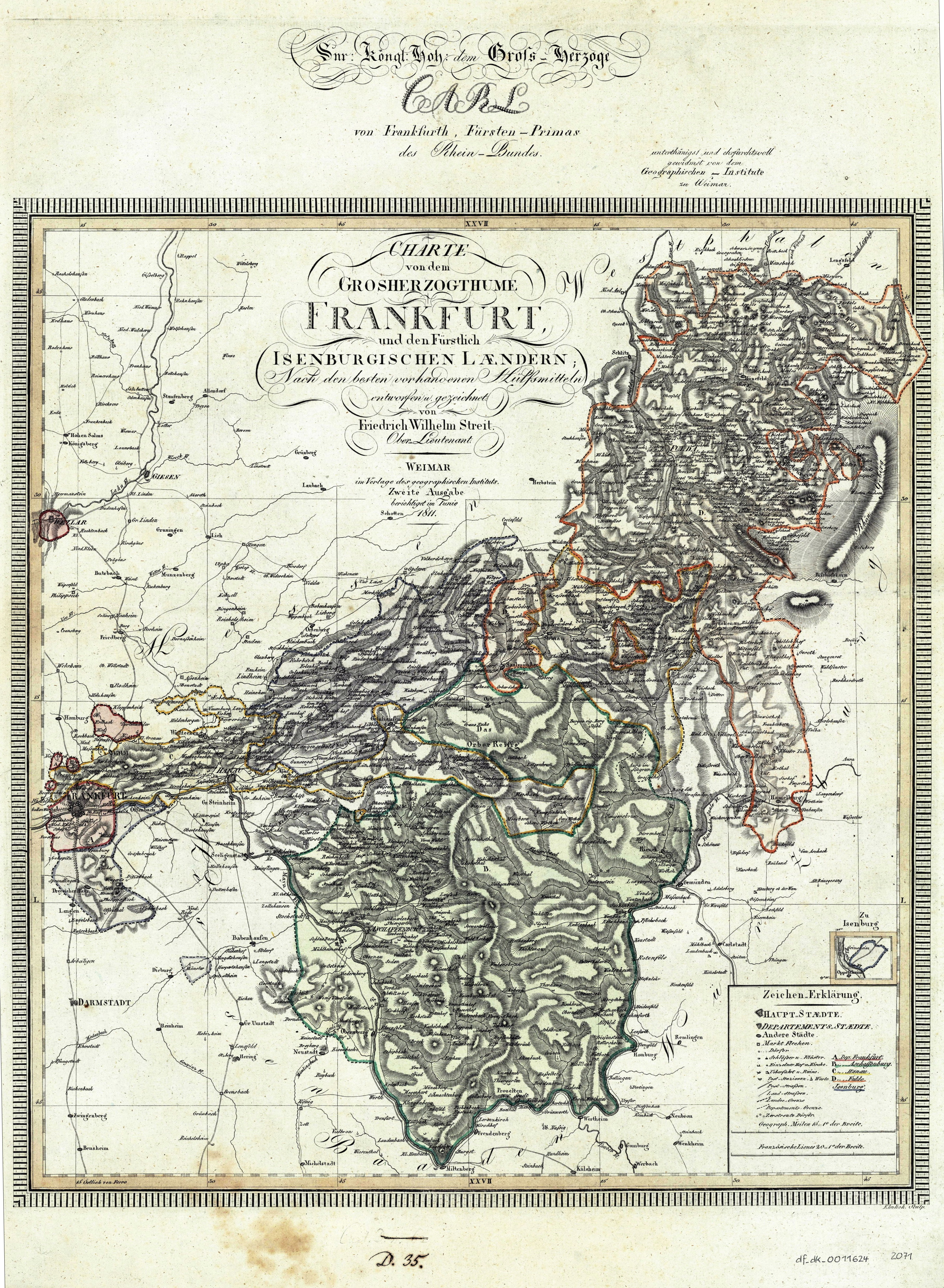
map of Grand Duke of Frankfurt

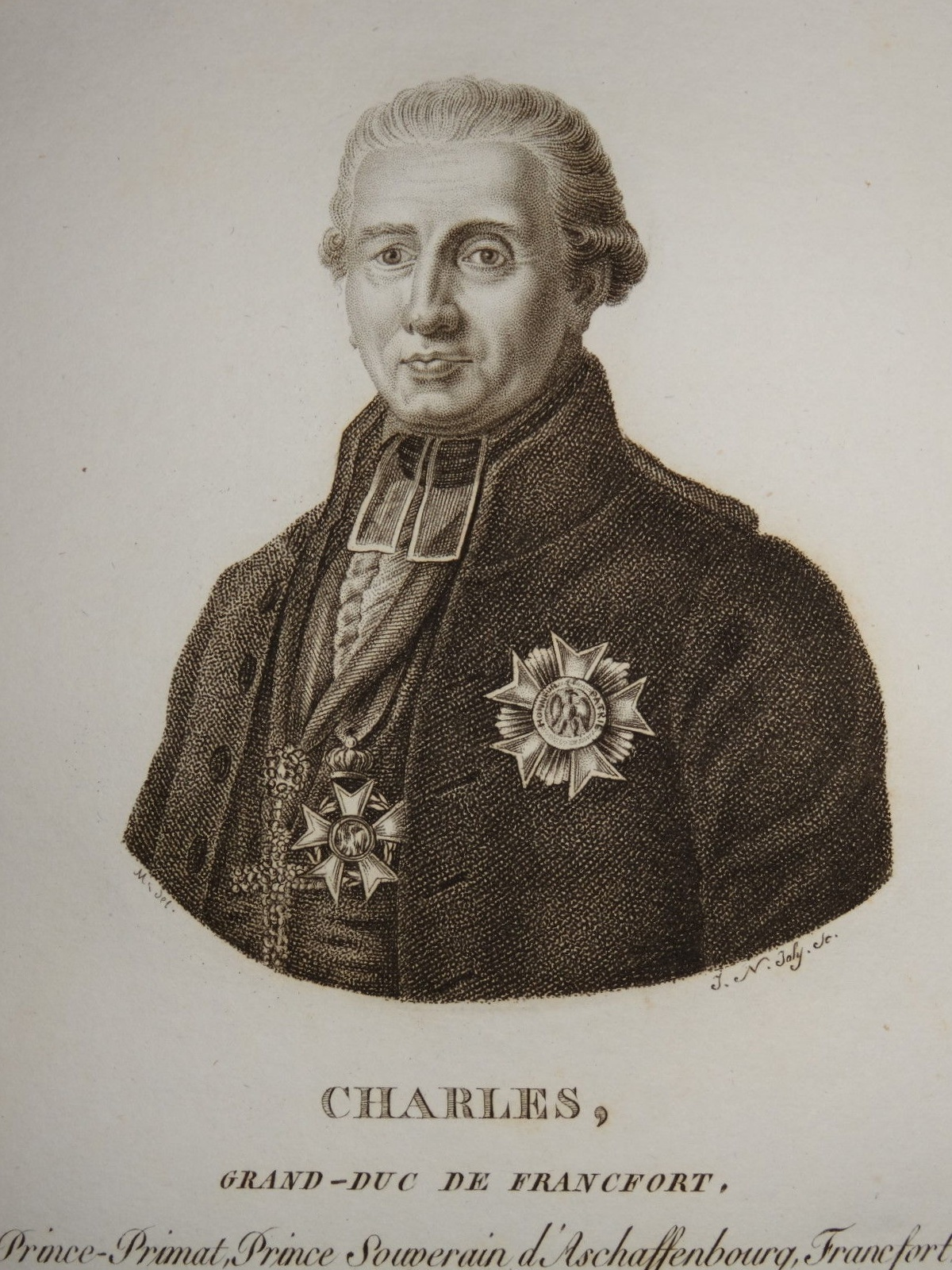
Karl Theodor von Dalberg as Grand Duke of Frankfurt

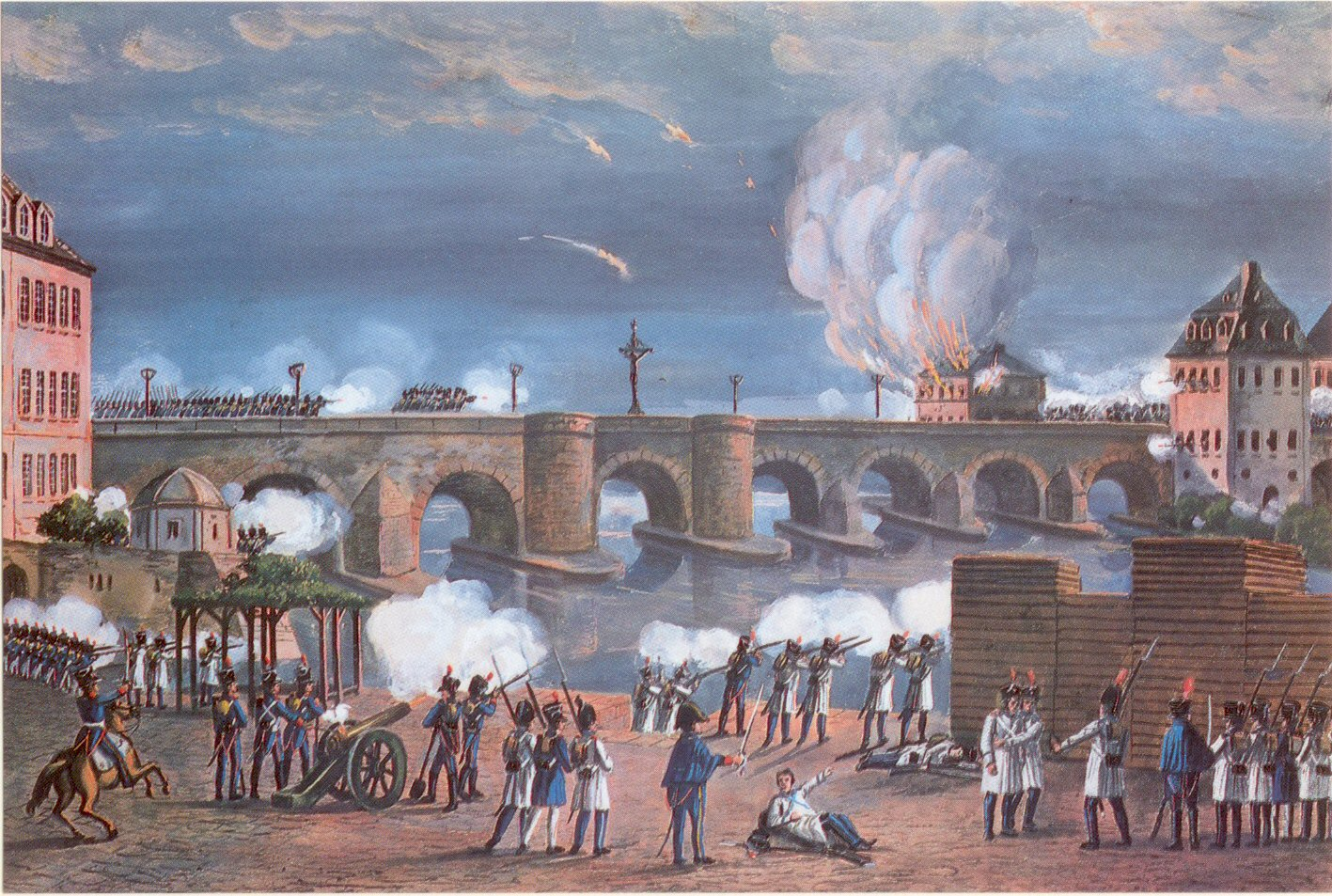
Battle of the Frankfurt Bridge between Austrian/Bavarian and French troops, 1813

Frankfurt lost its status as a free imperial city in 1806 with the dissolution of the Holy Roman Empire. The city was granted to the former archbishop of Mainz, Karl Theodor Anton Maria von Dalberg, and became the Principality of Frankfurt. When Dalberg was forced by Napoleon to relinquish his Principality of Regensburg to the Kingdom of Bavaria in 1810, his remaining territories of Aschaffenburg, Wetzlar, Fulda, Hanau, and Frankfurt were combined into the new Grand Duchy of Frankfurt.

Although the grand duchy was named after Frankfurt, the city was administered by French commissioners while Dalberg resided in the city of Aschaffenburg. According to the constitution of the grand duchy, upon Dalberg's death, the state would be inherited by Napoleon's stepson, Eugène de Beauharnais.

Dalberg abdicated in favour of Eugène on 26 October 1813, following Napoleon's defeat at the Battle of Leipzig. The grand duchy ceased to exist after December 1813, when the city was occupied by allied troops. While Frankfurt itself once again became a free city, most of the territory of the grand duchy was ultimately annexed by the Kingdom of Bavaria.
