= Principality of Aschaffenburg =

Principality

Principality of Aschaffenburg Fürstentum Aschaffenburg (German)
- 1803–1810
- Flag Coat of arms

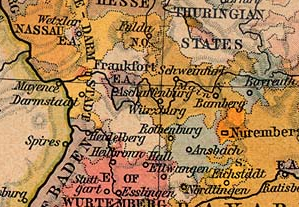
- Principality of Aschaffenburg (1803–1810) The Principality of Aschaffenburg in green, modern day German in light green.
- Status: State of the Holy Roman Empire (until 1806); Client state of the French Empire and State of the Confederation of the Rhine
- Capital: Aschaffenburg
- Government: Principality
- Historical era: Napoleonic Wars
  - Established: 1803
  - Merged into Grand Duchy of Frankfurt: 1810
  - Awarded to Bavaria: 1814
Preceded by	Succeeded by
Electorate of Mainz	Grand Duchy of Frankfurt

The Principality of Aschaffenburg (German: Fürstentum Aschaffenburg) was a principality of the Holy Roman Empire created in 1803 and, following the dissolution of the Empire in 1806, of the Confederation of the Rhine, which existed from 1806 to 1810. Its capital was Aschaffenburg.

With the secularization of the Archbishopric of Mainz in 1803, Karl Theodor Anton Maria von Dalberg was compensated by receiving the newly created principalities of Aschaffenburg and Regensburg and the County of Wetzlar. Along with the city of Aschaffenburg, the Principality of Aschaffenburg also consisted of Klingenberg, Lohr, Aufenau, Stadtprozelten, Orb, and Aura.

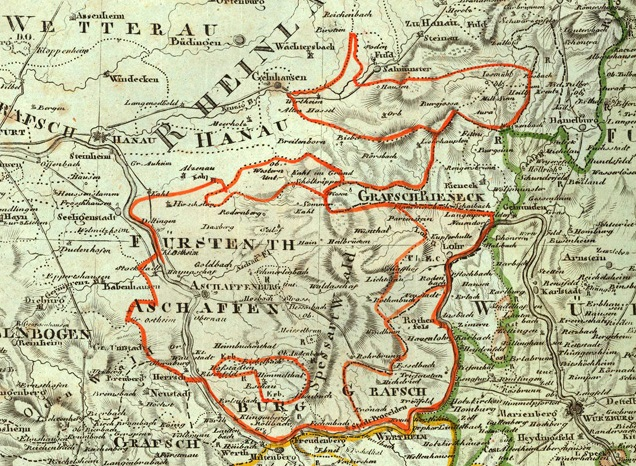
Map of Principality of Aschaffenburg

The principality became part of the Confederation of the Rhine in 1806 after the dissolution of the Holy Roman Empire. In 1810 Napoleon granted Dalberg's Principality of Regensburg to the Kingdom of Bavaria and compensated him with Hanau and Fulda. Dalberg merged his remaining territories of Aschaffenburg, Frankfurt, Wetzlar, Hanau, and Fulda into the new Grand Duchy of Frankfurt, with the Principality of Aschaffenburg becoming a department of the new grand duchy. The city of Aschaffenburg remained the residence of Dalberg, however. The region was annexed by Bavaria in 1814.
