= Josef Stangl =

German Roman Catholic bishop (1907–1979)

The Most Reverend Josef Stangl
- Bishop of Würzburg
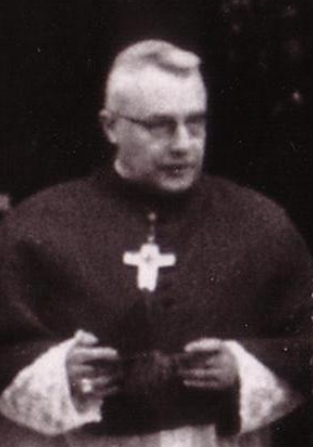
- Appointed: 27 June 1957
- Installed: 12 September 1957
- Term ended: 8 January 1979
- Predecessor: Julius August Döpfner
- Successor: Paul-Werner Scheele

Orders
- Ordination: 16 March 1930
- Consecration: 12 September 1957 by Josef Schneider

Personal details
- Born: Josef Stangl; 12 August 1907 Kronach, German Empire
- Died: 8 April 1979 (aged 71) Schweinfurt, West Germany
- Denomination: Roman Catholic
- Motto: domino plebem perfectam
- Coat of arms

Josef Stangl (German: [ˈjoːzɛf ˈʃtaŋl̩]; 12 August 1907 – 8 April 1979) was a Roman Catholic bishop of Würzburg, Germany.

Born in Kronach, Bavaria, Stangl became a priest on 16 March 1930, and he was appointed by Pope Pius XII as Bishop of Würzburg on 27 June 1957.

He approved the exorcism on Anneliese Michel in 1975 and 1976, ordering total secrecy, "after careful consideration and good information" by Father Arnold Renz. She died of malnutrition from almost a year of semi-starvation while the rites of exorcism were performed.

Stangl consecrated Father Joseph Ratzinger, later Pope Benedict XVI, as a bishop on 28 May 1977.

On 8 January 1979, Stangl withdrew as a bishop of Würzburg, and died in Schweinfurt in April 1979.

Catholic Church titles
Preceded by Julius Cardinal Döpfner	Bishop of Würzburg; 1957-1979	Succeeded by Paul-Werner Scheele
