= Mönchberg =

- Municipality
- Coat of arms

- Location of Mönchberg within Miltenberg district
- Interactive map of Mönchberg
- Location within Germany Location within Bavaria
- Coordinates: 49°47′N 09°14′E
- Country: Germany
- State: Bavaria
- Admin. region: Unterfranken
- District: Miltenberg
- Municipal assoc.: Mönchberg

Government
  - Mayor (2024–30): Bernd Wetzel

Area
  - Total: 24.15 km^{2} (9.32 sq mi)
- Elevation: 254 m (833 ft)

Population (2025-12-31)
  - Total: 2,504
  - Density: 103.7/km^{2} (268.5/sq mi)
- Time zone: UTC+01:00 (CET)
  - Summer (DST): UTC+02:00 (CEST)
- Postal codes: 63933
- Dialling codes: 09374
- Vehicle registration: MIL
- Website: www.moenchberg.de

Mönchberg (German pronunciation: [ˈmœnçbɛʁk]) is a market municipality in the Miltenberg district in the Regierungsbezirk of Lower Franconia (Unterfranken) in Bavaria, Germany. It is the seat of the Verwaltungsgemeinschaft (Administrative Community) of Mönchberg and a state-recognized climatic spa (Luftkurort).

== Geography ==
=== Location ===
Mönchberg lies in the Bavarian part of the Spessart (range), 13 km from the district seat of Miltenberg, 30 km from Aschaffenburg, 69 km from Frankfurt am Main and 76 km from Würzburg.

=== Neighbouring communities ===
Mönchberg borders in the west on Klingenberg and Erlenbach (with the outlying centres of Mechenhard and Streit), in the north on Elsenfeld and Eschau, in the east on Collenberg (on the Main) and in the south on Röllbach.

=== Subdivisions ===
The outlying centre, or Ortsteil, of Schmachtenberg, was amalgamated in 1978.

== History ==
The community was originally a postal station on the way from Würzburg by way of Wertheim to Aschaffenburg. Its original name was Manno Gebur, meaning "Manno's Building", after the station's first owner. In the 1387, Mönchberg was granted town rights along with its own jurisdiction by Charles IV, Holy Roman Emperor. The settlement in the Spessart earned its livelihood through forestry and handicrafts. Because the town lay far off the trade routes and so far from the settled areas on the Main, however, Mönchberg could develop no further in the end and therefore had to give up its town rights, which today are granted strictly to communities with a population of 5,000 or more. However, the community kept its market rights.

=== Schmachtenberg ===
The village of Schmachtenberg had its first documentary mention in 1298. The Baroque church was built between 1759 and 1761. Until after the Second World War, Schmachtenberg's economy was wholly agriculturally based, and in 1978, the formerly self-administering community was amalgamated with Mönchberg. In 1997, Schmachtenberg was enlarged by a new building area. The place currently has roughly 450 inhabitants.

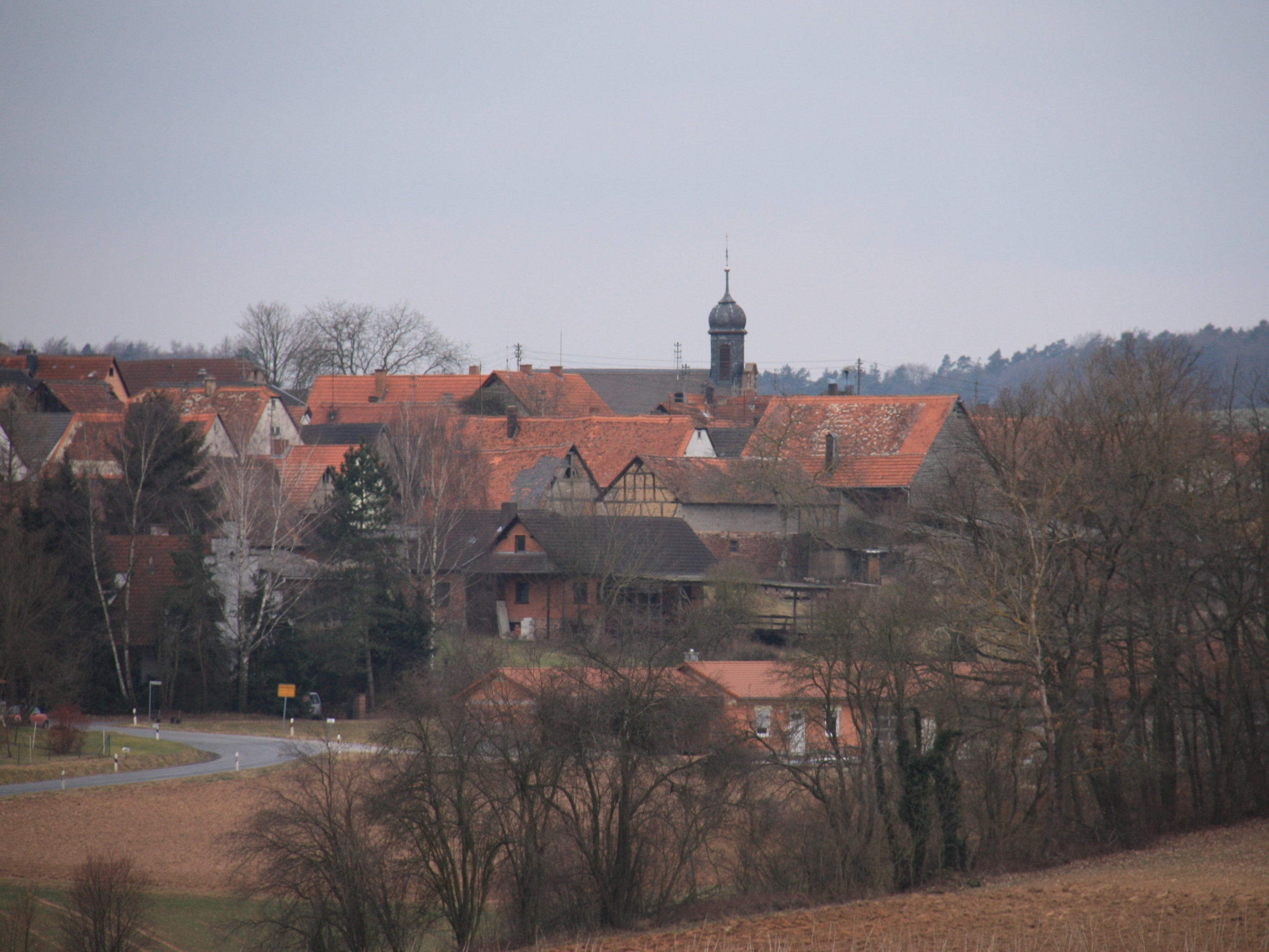
Schmachtenberg

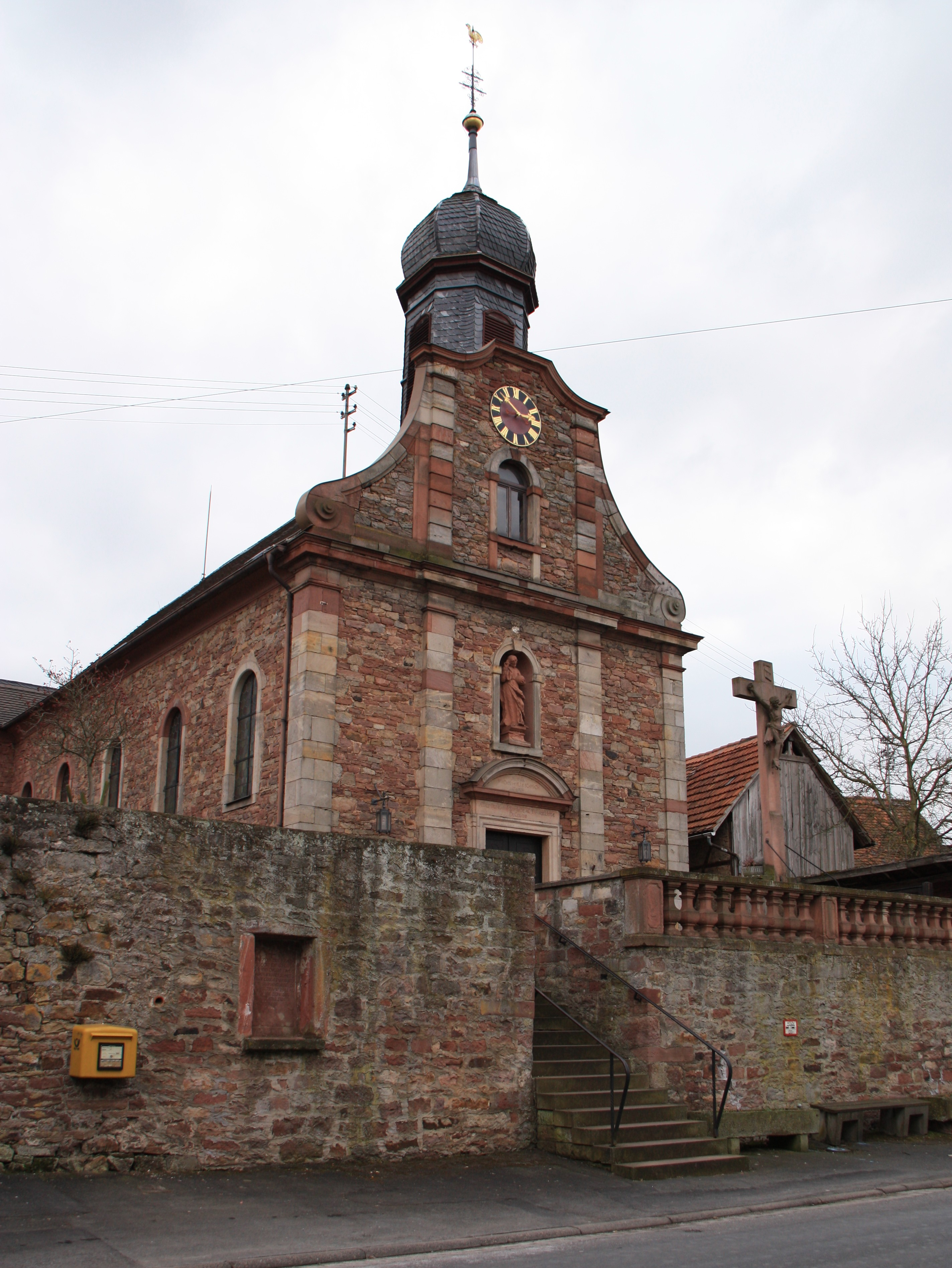
Schmachtenberg parish church

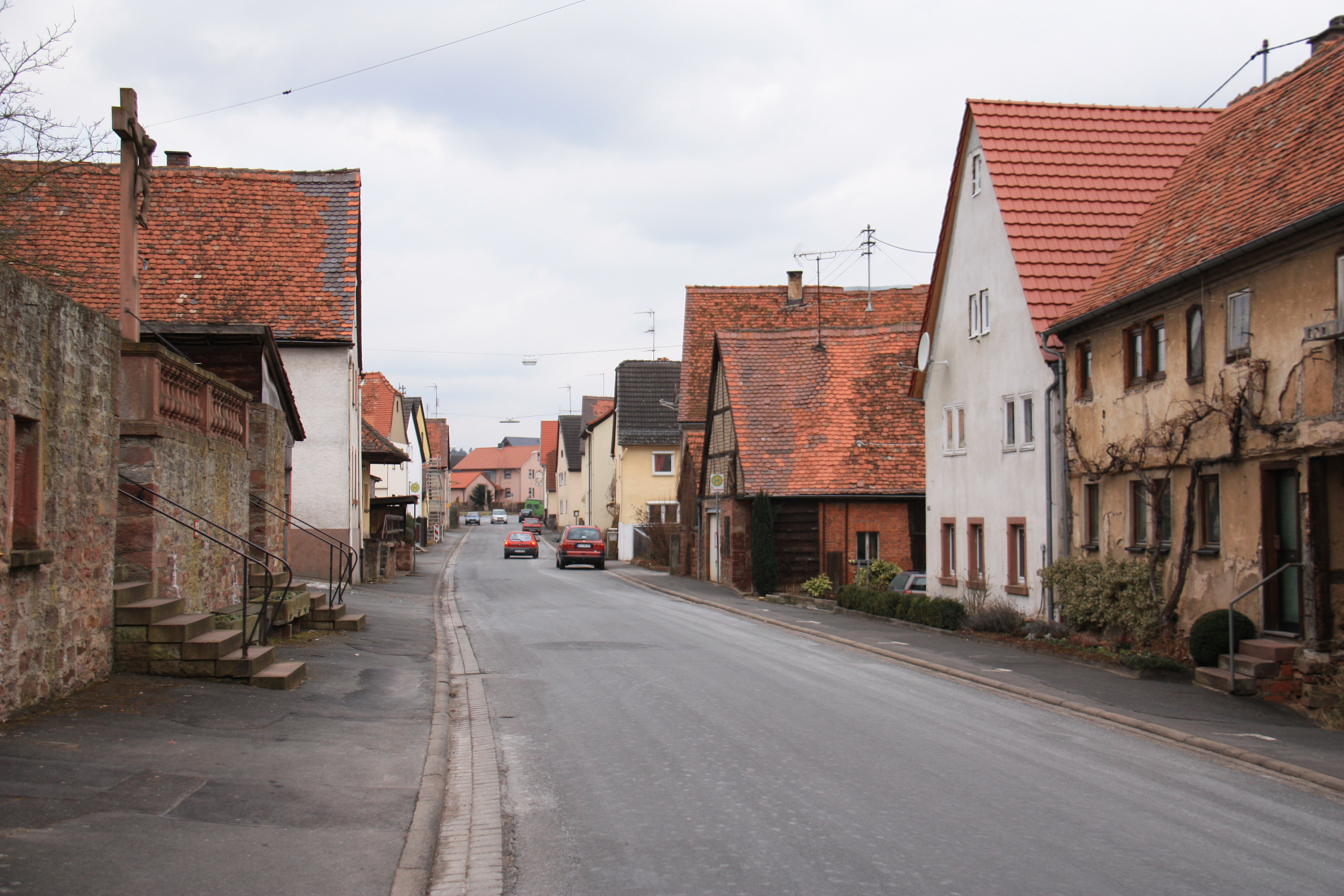
Schmachtenberg main street

== Economy ==
The market community's main draw is the Spessartbad (a public swimming pool). Further leisure facilities on offer are tennis courts, a music pavilion and a Kneipp pool facility.

Because it has been recognized as a climatic spa (Luftkurort) and because of its location in the Spessart, Mönchberg is a popular destination for hikers and tourists. In and around Mönchberg, 90 km of hiking trails have been laid out.

== Attractions ==
The old town wall is still preserved, and can be seen, for instance, at the music pavilion in the rosegarden. Furthermore, the community has many mediaeval buildings and timber-frame houses, as well as a big Baroque parish church.

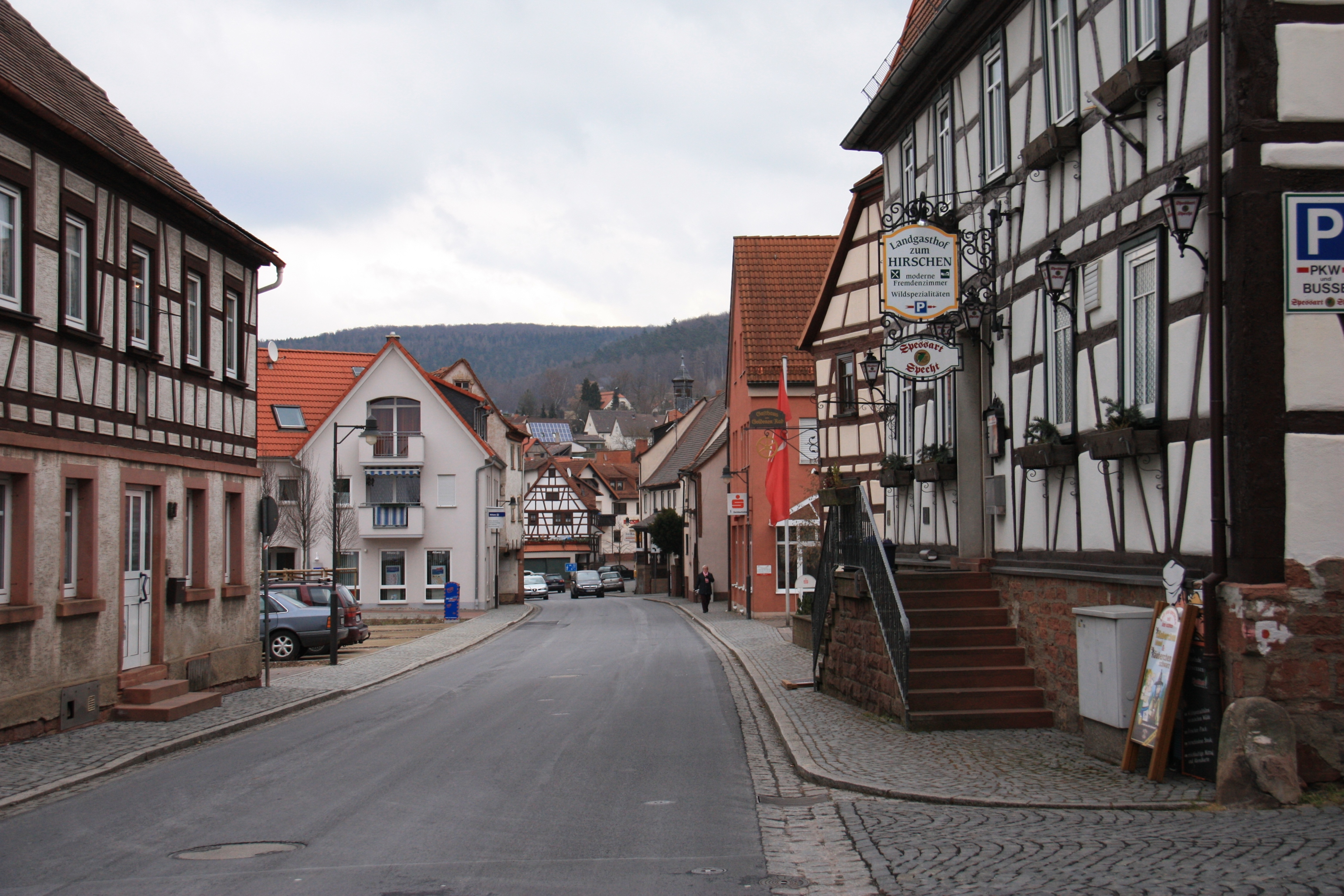
Main street

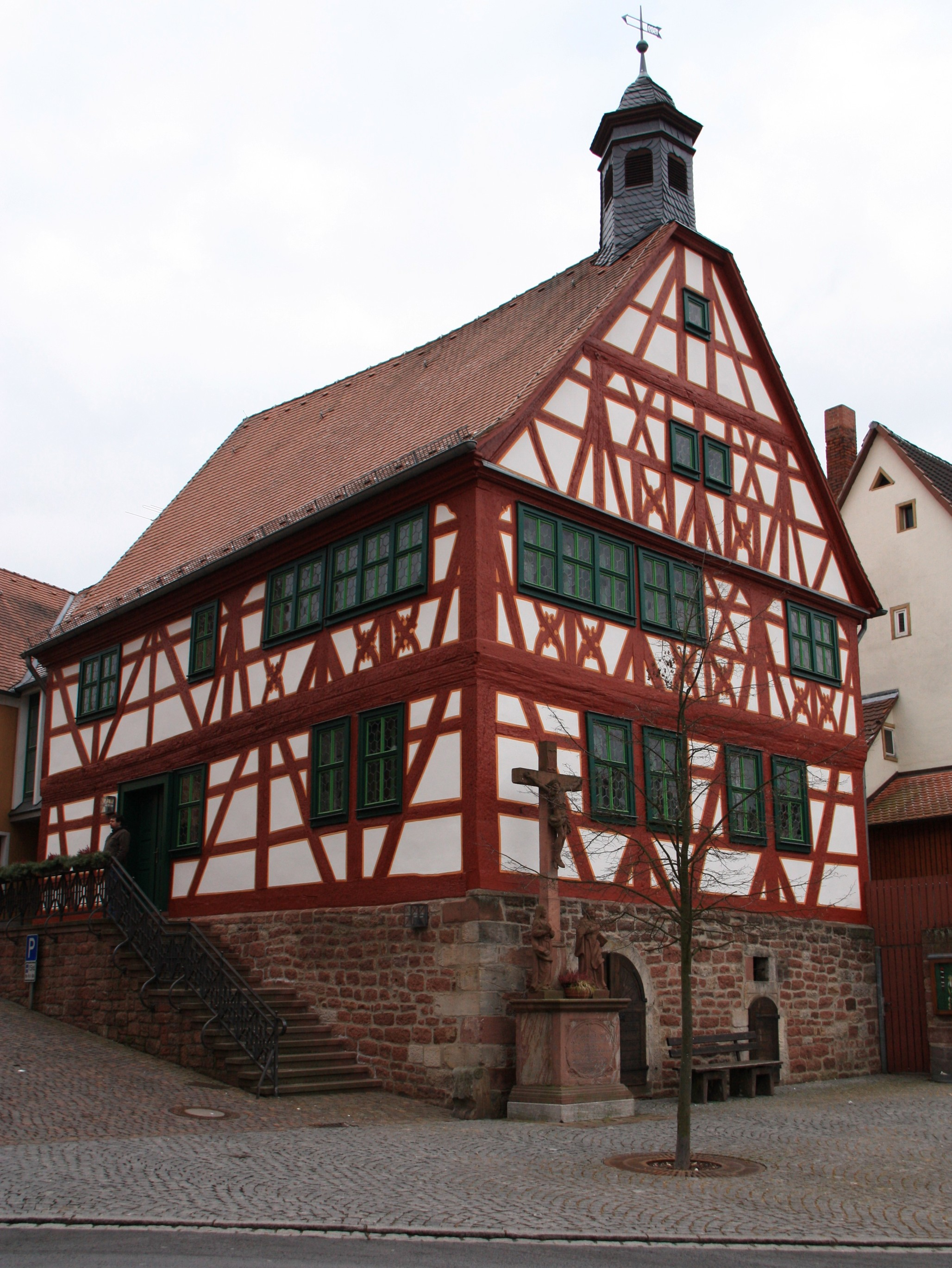
Old town hall

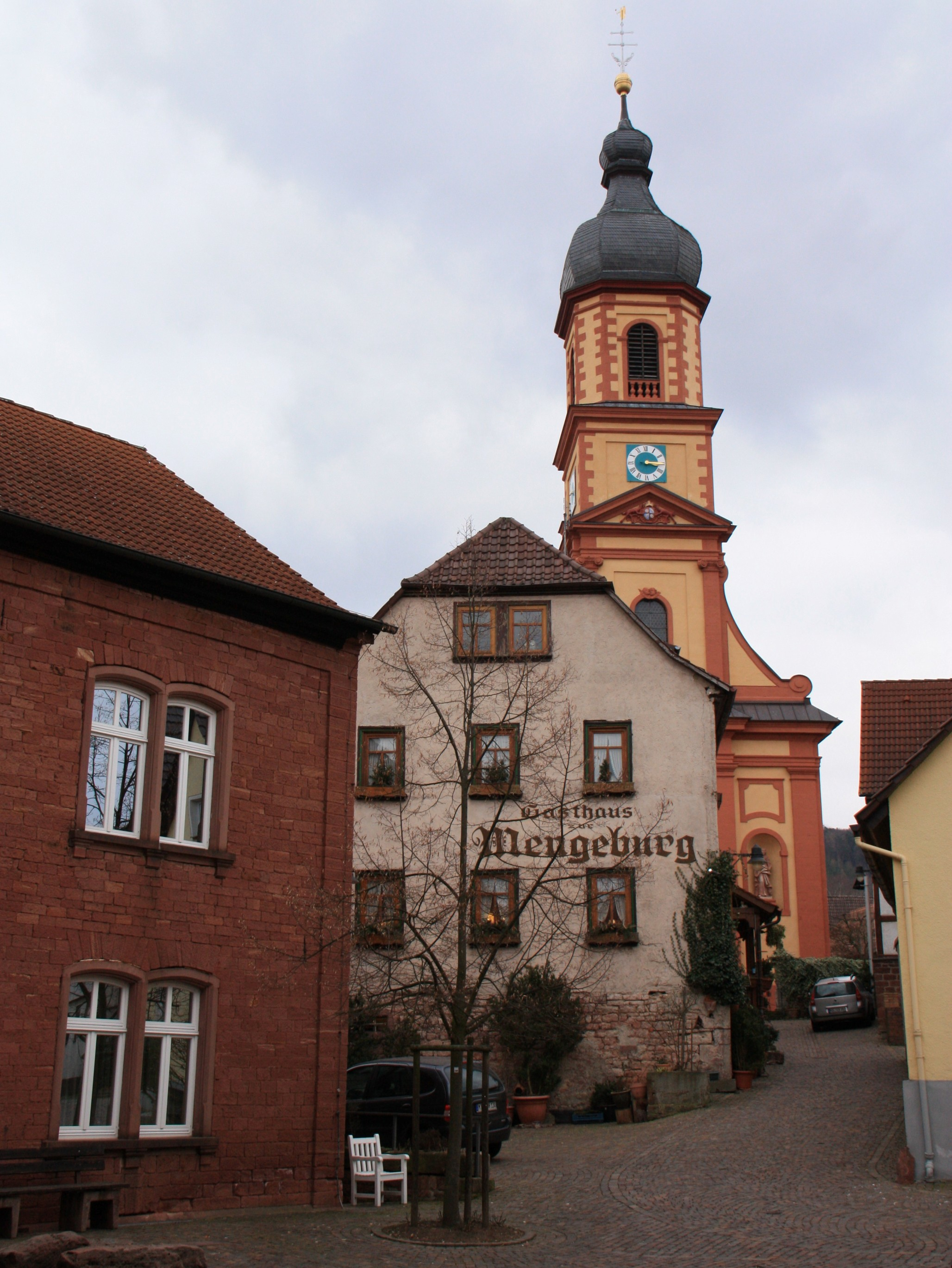
Parish church

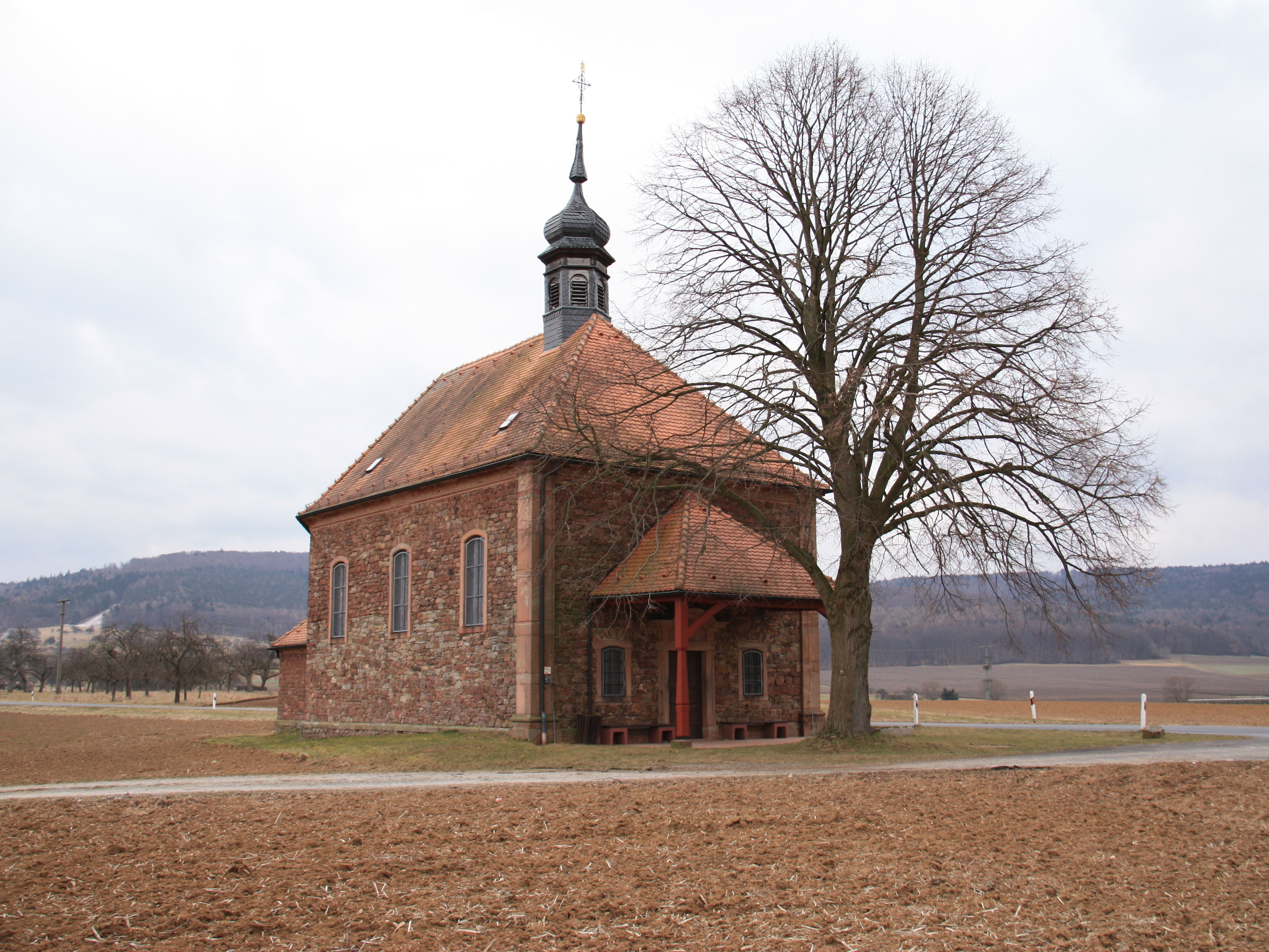
Wendelinuskapelle (Wendelin's Chapel)

== Government ==
=== Community council ===
The council is made up of 14 council members with seats apportioned thus (2020 election):

- CSU: 5 seats
- Bürgerblock Mönchberg (BBM): 7 seats
- Wählergemeinschaft Schmachtenberg (WGS): 2 seats

=== Coat of arms ===
The community's arms might be described thus: Per pale, dexter argent a pikestaff issuant from base sable bladed azure and tasselled Or, sinister gules in chief a crown Or, in base a wheel spoked of six of the first.

The pikestaff and the crown both refer to the Carolingian king's soldier-farmers (Wehrbauern) who settled the community. The community's overlords changed several times throughout its history, and several times it belonged to the Archbishopric of Mainz, ending up in Mainz's hands for good, or at least until the Old Empire's 1803 downfall, in 1720. The so-called Wheel of Mainz refers to this state.

The arms have been borne since 1965.

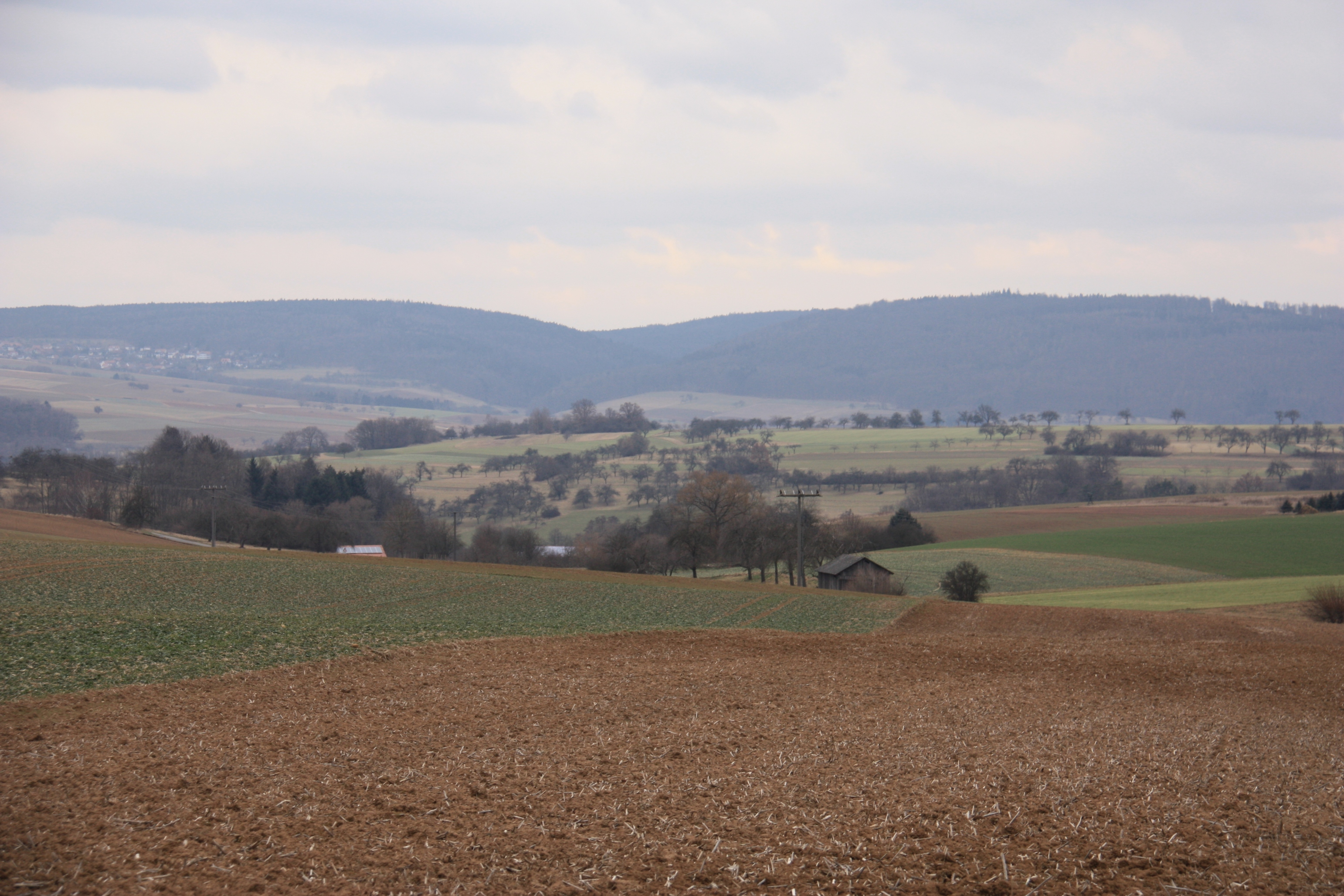
Landscape near Mönchberg
