= Klingenberg am Main =

- Town
- View of the town from the Clingenburg

- Coat of arms

- Location of Klingenberg am Main within Miltenberg district
- Interactive map of Klingenberg am Main
- Location within Germany Location within Bavaria
- Coordinates: 49°47′N 9°11′E
- Country: Germany
- State: Bavaria
- Admin. region: Unterfranken
- District: Miltenberg

Government
  - Mayor (2020–26): Ralf Reichwein (CSU)

Area
  - Total: 21.12 km^{2} (8.15 sq mi)
- Elevation: 128 m (420 ft)

Population (2025-12-31)
  - Total: 6,006
  - Density: 284.4/km^{2} (736.5/sq mi)
- Time zone: UTC+01:00 (CET)
  - Summer (DST): UTC+02:00 (CEST)
- Postal codes: 63911
- Dialling codes: 09372
- Vehicle registration: MIL
- Website: www.klingenberg-main.de

Klingenberg am Main (German pronunciation: [ˈklɪŋənˌbɛʁk ʔam ˈmaɪn], lit. 'Klingenberg on the Main') is a town in the Miltenberg district in the Regierungsbezirk of Lower Franconia (Unterfranken) in Bavaria, Germany. It has a population of around 6,200 and is located on both banks of the river Main.

== Geography ==
=== Location ===
The town lies right on the boundary with the state of Hesse on the Lower Main and is made up of the old town of Klingenberg and the two villages of Trennfurt and Röllfeld that were amalgamated with the town in 1976. Lying on the Main’s right bank at the foot of the Spessart (range) are Klingenberg and Röllfeld, whereas Trennfurt is over on the left bank at the foot of the Odenwald (range).

There are two vineyards above the main town of Klingenberg with their terrace-shaped slopes: the Hohberg (towards Erlenbach) and the Schlossberg (towards Großheubach), where, among others, the well known Klingenberg red wine is grown (mainly Pinot noir and Blauer Portugieser).

Klingenberg lies 12 km away from the district seat of Miltenberg, 28 km from the greater centre of Aschaffenburg and 67 km from Frankfurt, and is – like the whole Bavarian Lower Main (Bayerischer Untermain) – part of the Rhein-Main-Gebiet (Frankfurt Rhine Main Region).

=== Neighbouring communities ===
Klingenberg borders in the north on the towns of Erlenbach (on the same side of the Main as Klingenberg) and Wörth (on the Trennfurt side), in the east on the Spessart communities of Mönchberg and Röllbach, in the south on the market community of Großheubach (on the same side of the Main as Klingenberg) and the community of Laudenbach (on the Trennfurt side) and in the west on the Hessian Odenwald community of Lützelbach.

== History ==
A Roman worship stone, an early mediaeval circular rampart and the Grubinger Kirchhof (churchyard) on the road to Großheubach, likely going back to Alamannic times, are the oldest witnesses to Klingenberg's history. In the 2nd century, the Romans built the border fortifications of the Limes Germanicus through Germany, which ran along the Trennfurt side of the Main. The limes was strengthened with a fort in Trennfurt.

In 1100, a nobleman named Heinrich named himself after the old Clingenburg (castle). He belonged to the noble family of Reginbodo.

The Staufen-era Clingenburg was built around 1170 by Conradus Colbo, who was cup-bearer to Emperor Friedrich Barbarossa.

About 1250, the Bickenbach noble family moved into the castle; the Bickenbachs later held many influential offices in the Holy Roman Empire and many a time turned up in Imperial politics as brokers. In Bickenbach times, the town of Klingenberg beneath the castle had its first documentary mention, namely in 1276.

After the Bickenbachs died out in 1500, the town, castle and lordly domain passed to the Archbishop of Mainz. In 1552, Klingenberg's old town, like many other towns, was almost completely destroyed by the Albert Alcibiades, Margrave of Brandenburg-Kulmbach in the Second Margrave War. In the years that followed there was reconstruction.

Clingenburg castle was destroyed by the French in the late 17th century and never rebuilt. It remained a ruin.

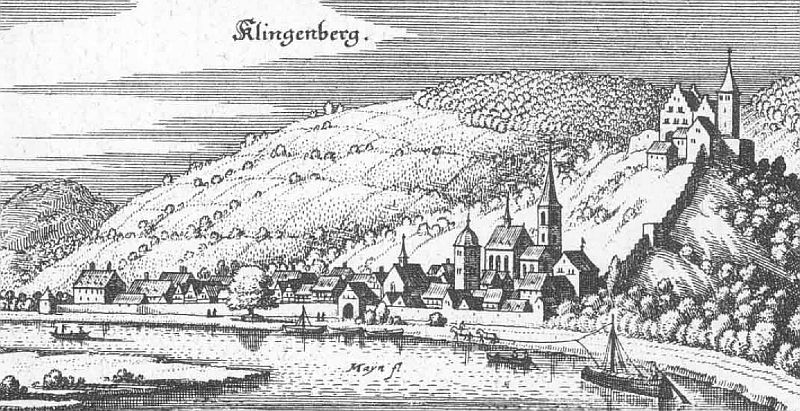
Klingenberg in the Topographia Hassiae by Matthäus Merian the Younger, 1655

After the dissolution of the Archbishopric of Mainz in the course of the 1803 Reichsdeputationshauptschluss, Klingenberg at first belonged to Prince Primate von Dalberg's newly formed Principality of Aschaffenburg, which was swallowed in 1810 by the Grand Duchy of Frankfurt along with its capital, Aschaffenburg. After the 1814/15 Congress of Vienna, Klingenberg, along with the whole Aschaffenburg-Miltenberg region and the Grand Duchy of Würzburg (the successor state to the old Prince-Bishopric of Würzburg) passed to the Kingdom of Bavaria.

In the 19th and early 20th centuries, the clay mine (first mentioned in 1567) brought the town great wealth. The citizens were therefore exempt from taxes in the late 19th century and indeed were paid Bürgergeld (literally "citizens' money"), a dividend from the town's earnings. Furthermore, among other things, a lookout tower, a bridge across the Main, a school, a new town hall and many elegant middle-class houses (Bürgerhäuser), such as those on Wilhelmstraße and Ludwigstraße, were built. Klingenberg was one of the first municipalities in the region to get an underground electrical supply network with its own power station in 1897. The population figure rose sharply.

In 1945, late in the Second World War, there was fighting in Klingenberg between German troops and advancing Americans. The Germans eventually withdrew, but not before blowing up the Main bridge between Klingenberg and Trennfurt, which was rebuilt only in 1950. The town's historic buildings were hardly affected by the fighting.

In 1976, Klingenberg earned worldwide notice for the case of a young woman named Anneliese Michel, whom the Church believed to be possessed by demons. After an exorcism lasting several months, she died.

In the framework of municipal reform, Klingenberg was united in 1976 with Trennfurt and Röllfeld to form the new greater town of Klingenberg.

== Economy ==
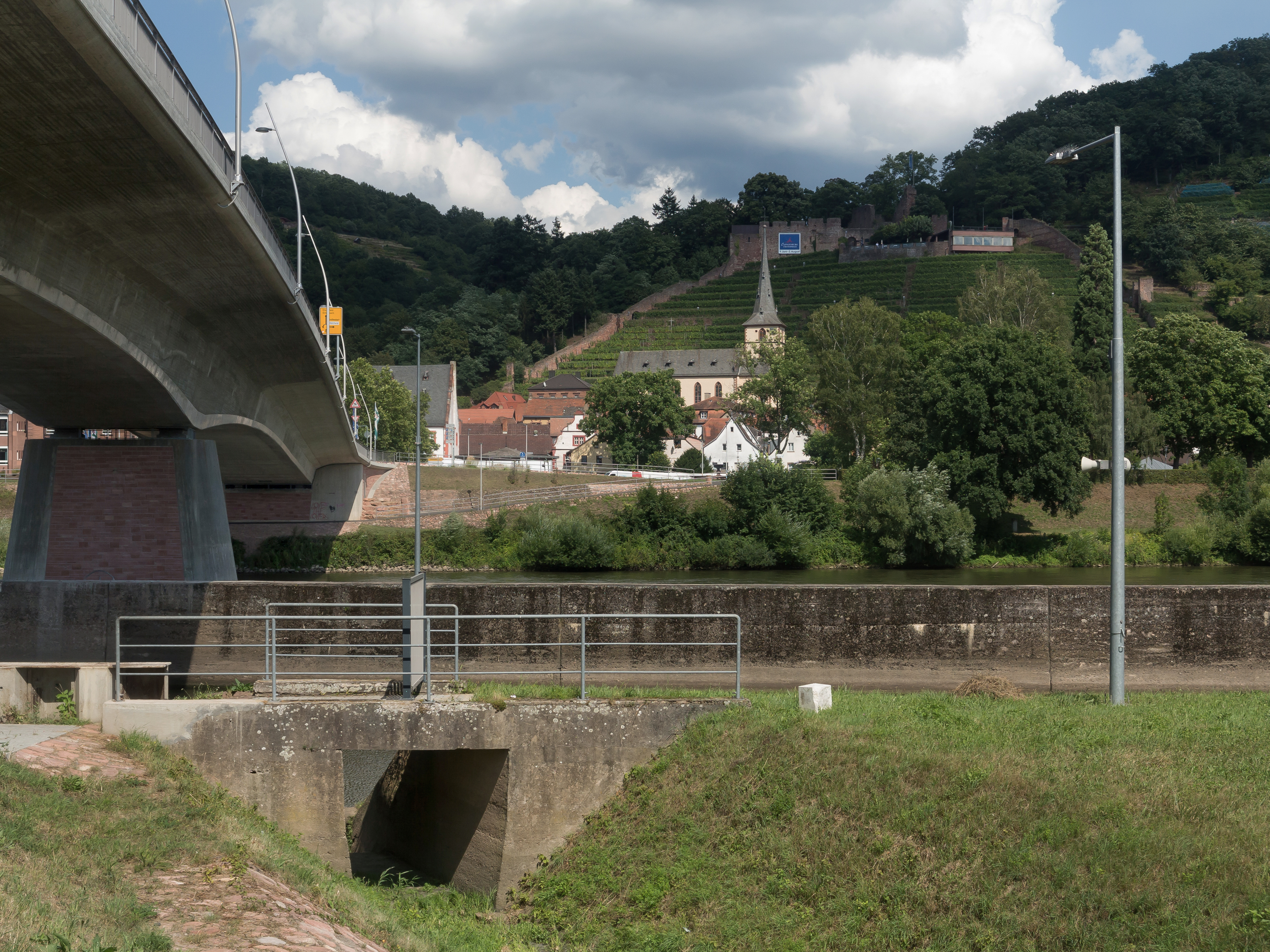
Klingenberg view of the town across the Main

Big firms in Klingenberg are the WIKA manometer factory, the ceramic manufacturer Klingenberg Dekoramik in Trennfurt and the lacquer manufacturer Hemmelrath in Röllfeld. Besides industry, tourism is an important sector. Klingenberg clay, which among other things is used in the pencil industry as a graphite additive, is still quarried today as it has been for hundreds of years (first documentary mention in 1567), albeit not in such great quantities as in the past. Since 1860, the clay pit has been owned by the municipality. It generated significant profits that even enabled the town to pay its citizens a stipend before World War I.

The town lies on the Route der Industriekultur Rhein-Main ("Rhine-Main Route of Industrial Culture"), a designated holiday route.

=== Winegrowing ===
Winegrowing here dates back at least to the 13th century. Klingenberg has at its disposal roughly 30 ha of winegrowing lands under commercial cultivation, whose ancient terraces make up part of the town's appearance.

All together there are three vineyards, the Schlossberg (25 ha) and the Erlenbacher Hohberg (2 ha) on the same side of the Main as Klingenberg, and the Einsiedel (2 ha) in the outlying centre of Trennfurt. In the three Stadtteile there are all together 13 winemakers, among which is the municipal wine estate. Almost throughout the year there are traditional Häckerwirtschaften at which several winemakers regularly take it in turns to serve their wares. In Klingenberg vineyards, it is mostly (ca. 75%) red wine that is grown, with Pinot noir and Blauer Portugieser as the dominant varieties. Among white wine, Müller-Thurgau is the most common variety.

Since 1950, a wine festival, the Klingenberger Winzerfest, has been held each year in August. It is one of the biggest such festivals in the region. Klingenberg lies on the Fränkischer Rotwein Wanderweg ("Franconian Red Wine Hiking Trail"), a sign-posted long-distance hiking trail.

== Government ==
=== Town council and mayor ===
The council is made up of 20 council members, not counting the mayor, with seats apportioned thus:

- CSU 5 seats
- SPD 2 seats
- Green Party 3 seats
- Freie Wähler Klingenberg-Röllfeld (FWKR), local group, 2 seats
- Freie Wähler Trennfurt (FWT), local group, 4 seats
- Neue Mitte Klingenberg (NMK), local group, 4 seats

(as at municipal election held on 15 March 2020)

The mayor is Ralf Reichwein (CSU). He was re-elected on 15 March 2020 (60,3 % of the votes).

=== Town twinning ===
- Saint-Laurent-d'Arce, Gironde, France since 1980

Saint-Laurent-d'Arce is a fellow winegrowing centre, near Bordeaux.

=== Coat of arms ===
The town's arms might be described thus: Argent a wheel spoked of six gules, in base a mount of three vert.

Klingenberg's coat of arms comes from the 16th century and shows the Wheel of Mainz. The “mount of three” (or Dreiberg, as this device is called in German heraldry) stands for the Schlossberg and Hohberg mountains.

The arms have been borne since the 16th century.

== Attractions ==
Above Klingenberg's old town and the vineyards stands the mediaeval Clingenburg. The Electoral Mainz bailiffs (Amtmänner) resided at the castle until the mid-16th century. Thereafter, the castle fell into disrepair; the ruins were acquired by the town in 1871. In the 20th century it was opened up to tourism with a restaurant and a lookout platform affording visitors a view over the old town and the Main valley. Since 1994, the Clingenburg-Festspiele have been taking place, drawing many visitors each year with changing plays and musicals.

Klingenberg also features an historic old town with many timber-frame buildings from the 16th century, in particular the Altes Rathaus (old town hall) from 1561 (today a tourist information centre). Also in the old town stands the Stadtschloss ("town palace"), a Renaissance building from 1560 wherein lived the Mainz bailiffs of the Kottwitz von Aulenbach family and, beginning in 1693, the von Mairhofen family. The old town was once ringed by a town wall with three towers, most of which fell victim to the town's development at the beginning of the 20th century. Today, the parts of the wall between the castle and the old town and at the Stadtschloss are preserved. Also still standing is the southernmost of the three towers, the Brunntorturm (13th and 16th century) with a characteristic onion dome.

The church was built ca. 1467, replacing an older chapel.

In 1903, in the forest on the Hohberg (hill), a lookout tower was built in mediaeval style, which today is visited by many hikers and tourists.

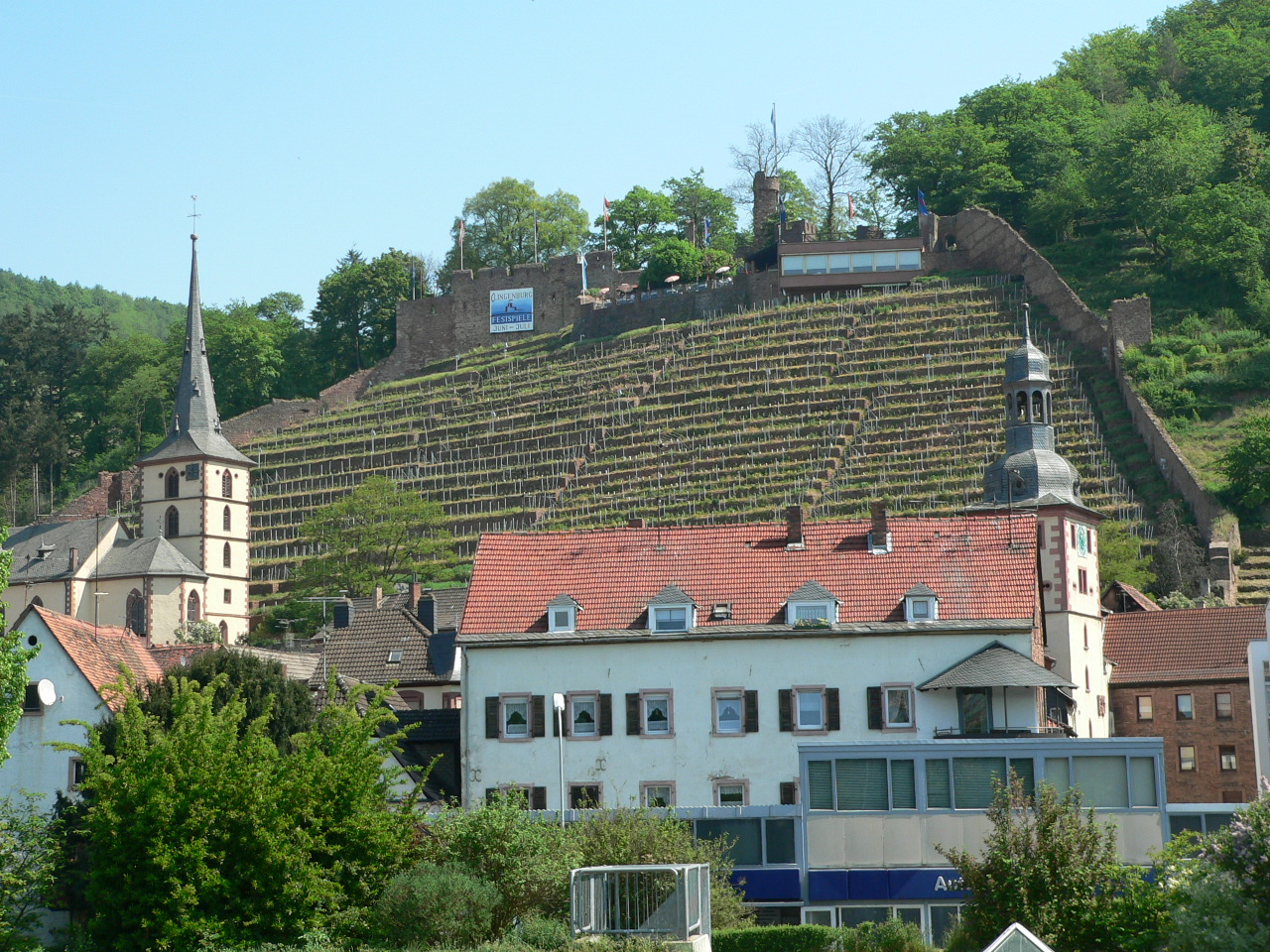
Vineyard and Clingenburg

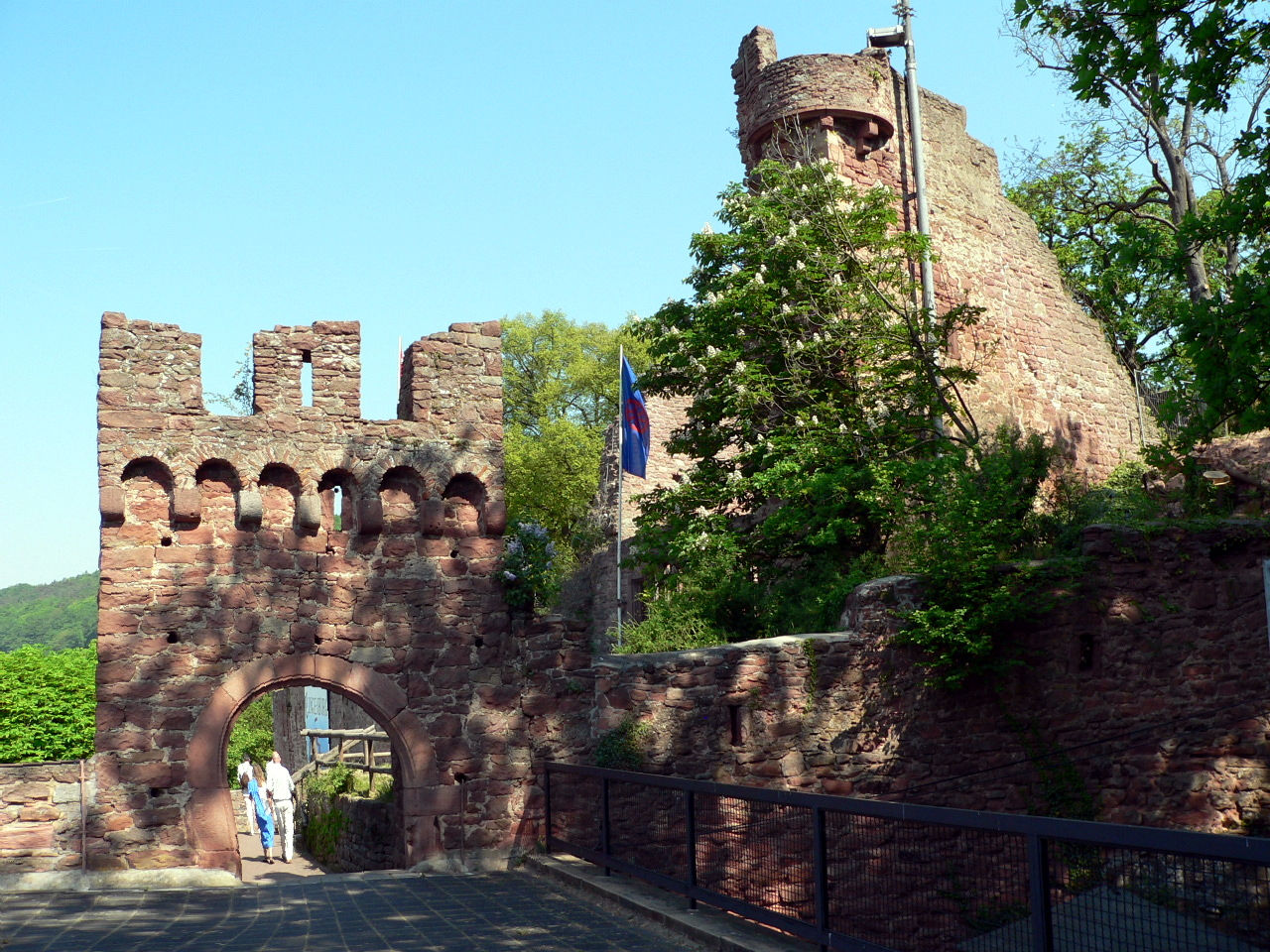
Clingenburg

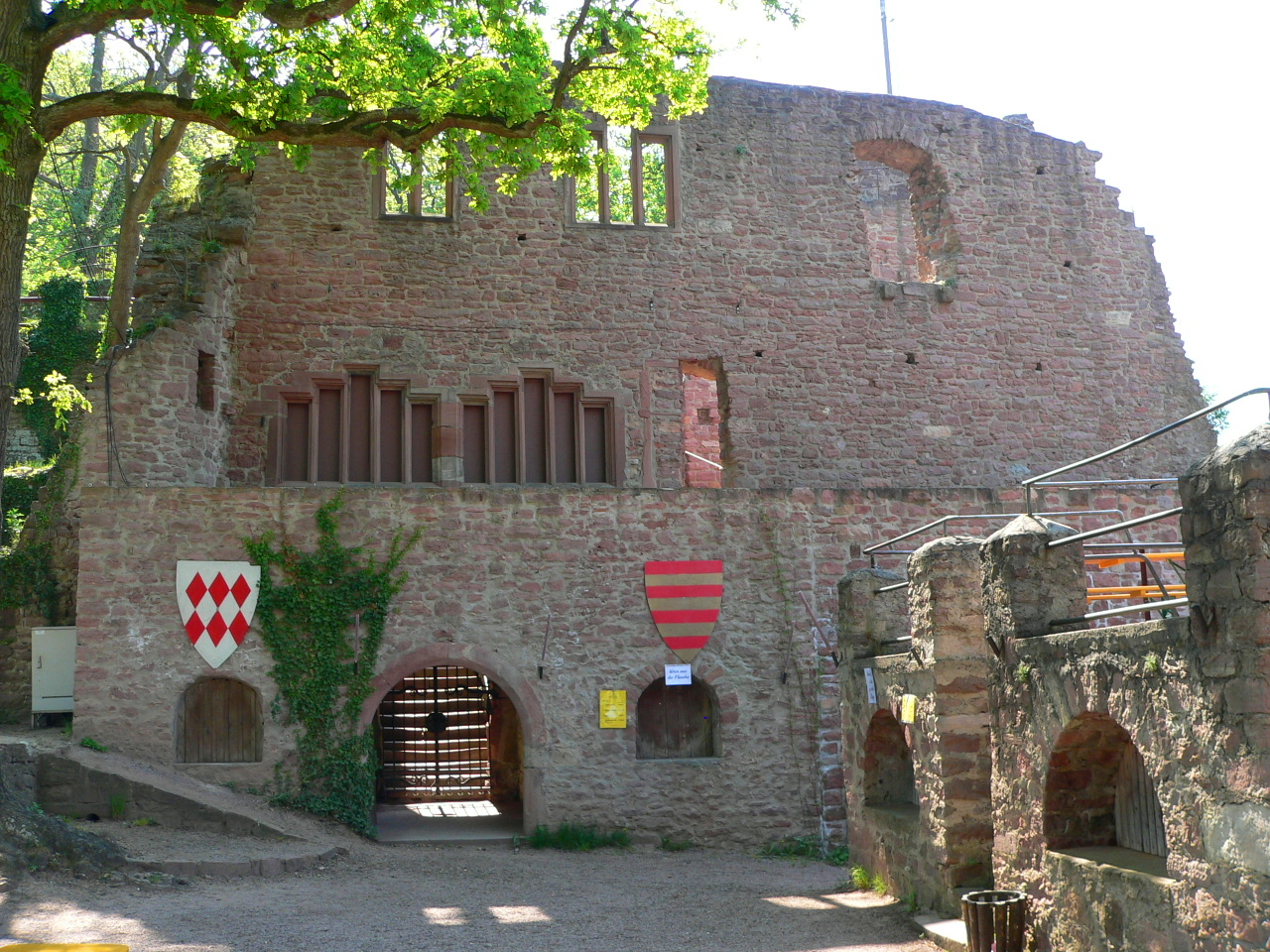
Clingenburg

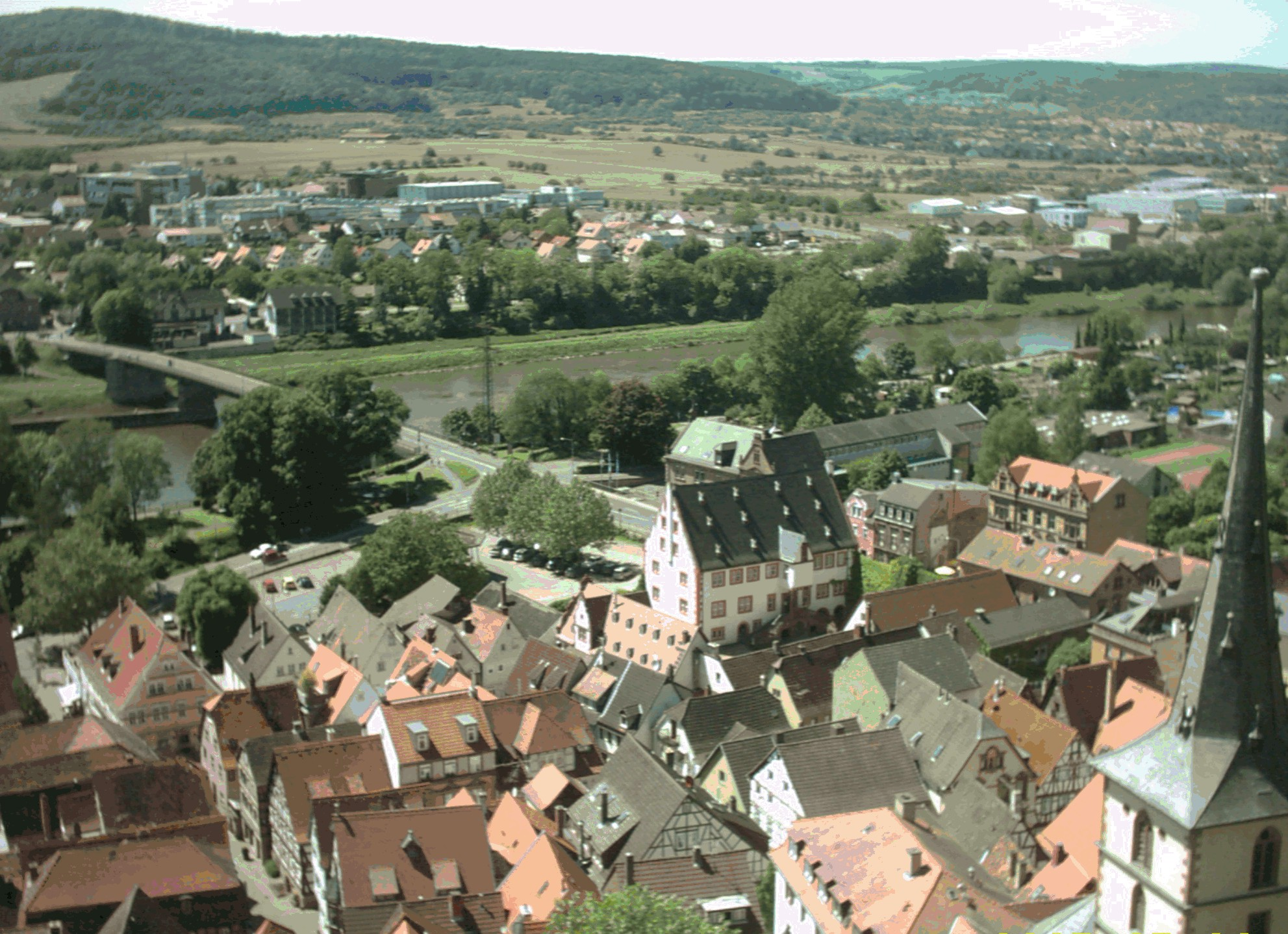
View of the old town
(seen from the Clingenburg)

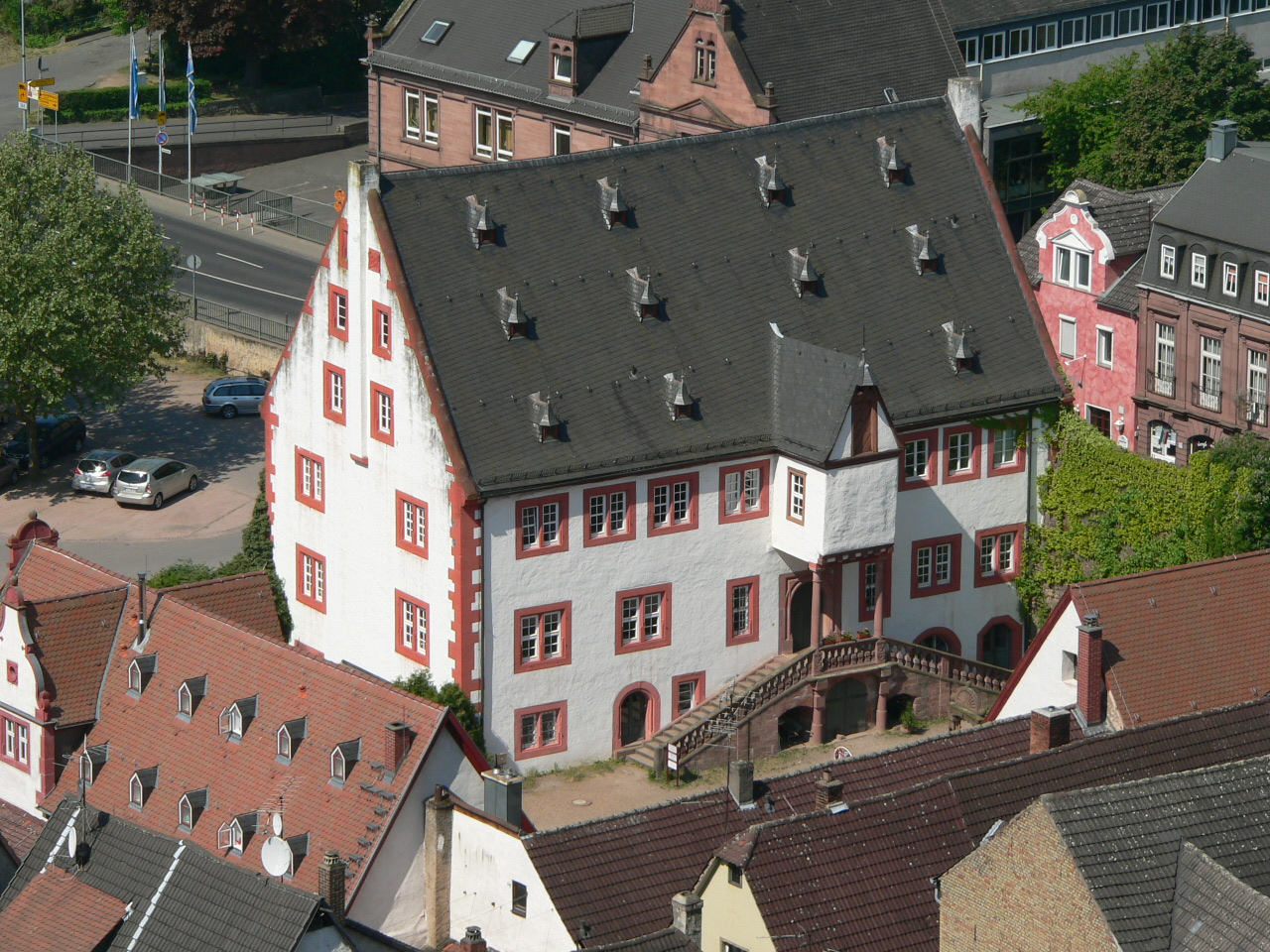
Stadtschloss

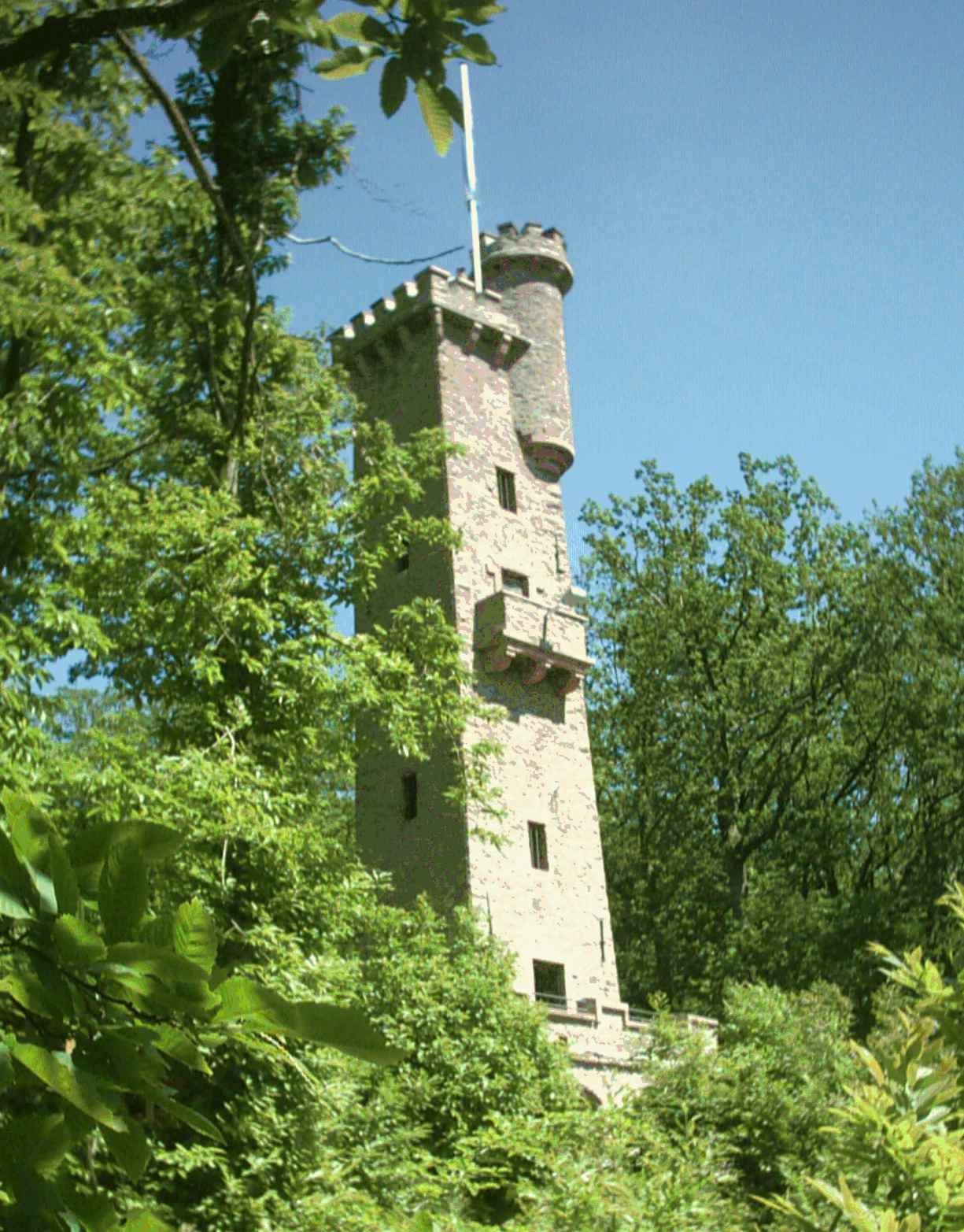
Lookout tower

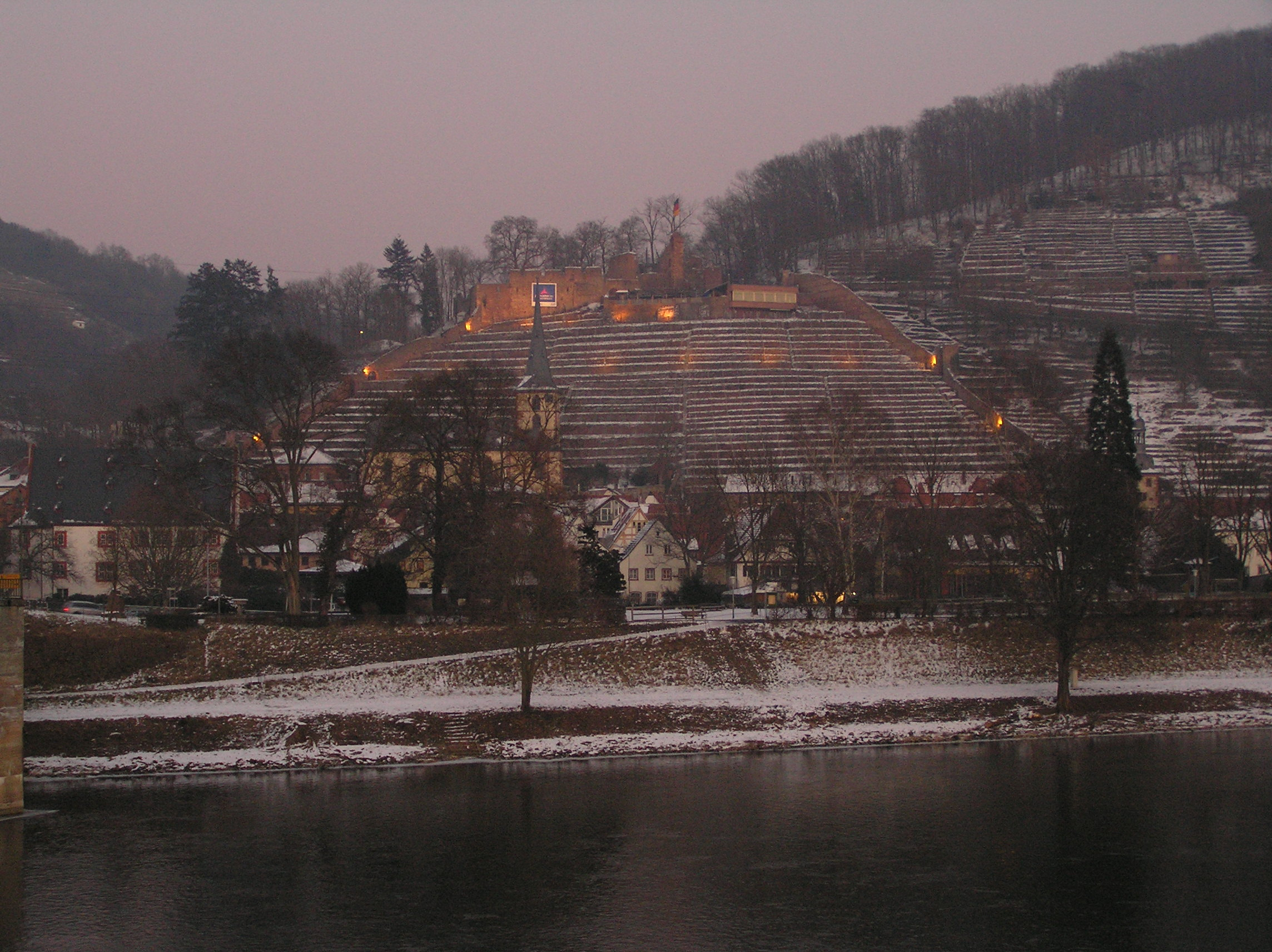
Klingenberg in the evening

Brunnentorturm

== Religion ==
The town of Klingenberg has a Catholic majority. The three parishes of Saint Pancra's in Klingenberg, the Assumption of Mary in Röllfeld and Mary Magdalene in Trennfurt belong to the deaconry of Obernburg within the Diocese of Würzburg.

The oldest of the three churches is the Kirche St. Pankratius (Saint Pancras's) in the main town of Klingenberg, which stands prominently above the old town. The Gothic quire and the sacristy come from the 15th century. The churchtower and the nave were built in 1617. Its current layout and the Gothic Revival appointments the church was given in the late 19th century. Both the churches in Röllfeld and Trennfurt come from Baroque times (17th to 18th century). The one in Trennfurt underwent some new building work after a fire in 1975 started by a lightning strike.

== Infrastructure ==
=== Transport ===
Bundesstraße 469, a four-lane highway running through Klingenberg, affords the town a link with Aschaffenburg and the Autobahnen A 3 (Frankfurt-Würzburg), A 45 (Dortmund-Aschaffenburg) and A 66 (Hanau-Fulda). The section running in the opposite direction to Miltenberg, however, has only two lanes (2008), although a three-lane expansion of the heavily travelled road has been considered.

Klingenberg features a railway station in the Stadtteil of Trennfurt. It is served by the Main Valley Railway (Aschaffenburg-Miltenberg-Wertheim).

== Notable people ==
- Johann Valentin Adrian (1793 - 1864), writer, librarian
- Werner Beierwaltes (b. 8 May 1931), philosophy professor
- Anneliese Michel (1952 - 1976), well known possession victim
- Willi Neuberger (b. 15 April 1946), footballer
