= Helmut Bauer (bishop) =

German Roman Catholic bishop (1933–2024)

- Auxiliary Bishop Emeritus of Würzburg
- Archdiocese: Bamberg
- Diocese: Würzburg
- Appointed: 11 July 1988
- Term ended: 18 March 2008
- Other post: Titular Bishop of Velefi (1988–2024)

Orders
- Ordination: 21 July 1957 by Aloisius Joseph Muench
- Consecration: 14 October 1988 by Paul-Werner Scheele

Personal details
- Born: 18 March 1933 Schimborn, Bavaria, Germany
- Died: 5 October 2024 (aged 91) Würzburg, Bavaria, Germany
- Education: University of Würzburg
- Motto: IN VIAM PACIS
- Coat of arms

Helmut Bauer (18 March 1933 – 5 October 2024) was a German Catholic theologian and an auxiliary bishop of the Diocese of Würzburg. In the diocese he represented the bishop and was responsible for the department of church music. He was instrumental in the revision of the Gotteslob hymnal and directed an ecumenical commission for hymns. Bauer acted as bishop of Würzburg during a year of vacancy beginning in 2003.

== Life and career ==
Bauer was born in Schimborn in Kahlgrund on 18 March 1933; his parents were farmers, Otto Bauer (1903–1983) and his wife Maria née Daniel (1905–1998). He attended primary school in Schimborn and received his secondary education at the Kilianeum in Würzburg, in Münnerstadt and Miltenberg. After completing school with the Abitur, he studied philosophy and Catholic theology at the University of Würzburg. Bauer was ordained as a priest in Würzburg on 21 July 1957 by archbishop Aloisius Joseph Muench. He worked for four years as a chaplain at Heilig Geist, Schweinfurt. He became prefect of the boys' seminary at the Kilianeum in 1961. From 1964 he directed the Studienseminar in Bad Königshofen, and from 1968 the Kilianeum.

Bishop Paul-Werner Scheele appointed Bauer to be a priest at the Würzburg Cathedral in 1983. He was elected dean in Würzburg the same year. Pope John Paul II appointed him titular bishop of Velefi and auxiliary bishop in Würzburg on 8 July 1988. He was consecrated as a bishop on 14 October 1988 by Bishop Scheele at the Würzburg Cathedral, assisted by Anton Schlembach from the Diocese of Speyer and Alfons Kempf. Bauer considered confirmations his prime duty as a bishop, and confirmed more than 150,000 young people, including 500 on a visit to Tanzania. Bauer became Bischofsvikar, representing the bishop, in 1989. He was responsible for church music and liturgy in the diocese. He was an enthusiastic singer and played horn and trombone. He was particularly engaged in the church music at the Würzburg Cathedral and remained its patron in retirement.

Bauer also presided over the commission for the Gotteslob, the 2013 second edition of the common Catholic hymnal in German, and an ecumenical commission for hymns, Arbeitsgemeinschaft für ökumenisches Liedgut, from 1990 to 2008. He was president of the commission for ecumenism of the Bavarian bishops for twelve years, and represented the Bavarian bishops in the work group of Christian churches in Bavaria (Arbeitsgemeinschaft christlicher Kirchen in Bayern). After Scheele retired in July 2003, Bauer was elected interim bishop and served until Friedhelm Hofmann was consecrated on 19 September 2004.

On 18 March 2008 Pope Benedict XVI accepted Bauer's retirement; he remained active in his positions in the Diocese until his successor Ulrich Boom took office on 31 January 2009. Bauer remained in Würzburg in retirement; he enjoyed bicycling, and played the piano to relax. The 30th anniversary of Bauer's consecration as a bishop was celebrated with a service at the Würzburg Cathedral. Bauer died at the Juliusspital in Würzburg while receiving palliative care on 5 October 2024, at the age of 91.

== Coat of arms ==
Bauer's coat of arms included the Celtic cross on a green background, related to Ireland, where the apostles of Franconia, saints Kilian, Colman and Totnan, came from. His motto was "in viam pacis" (on the way of peace) from the Benedictus canticle, also related to his love of church music.

== Maria im Aufgang chapel ==
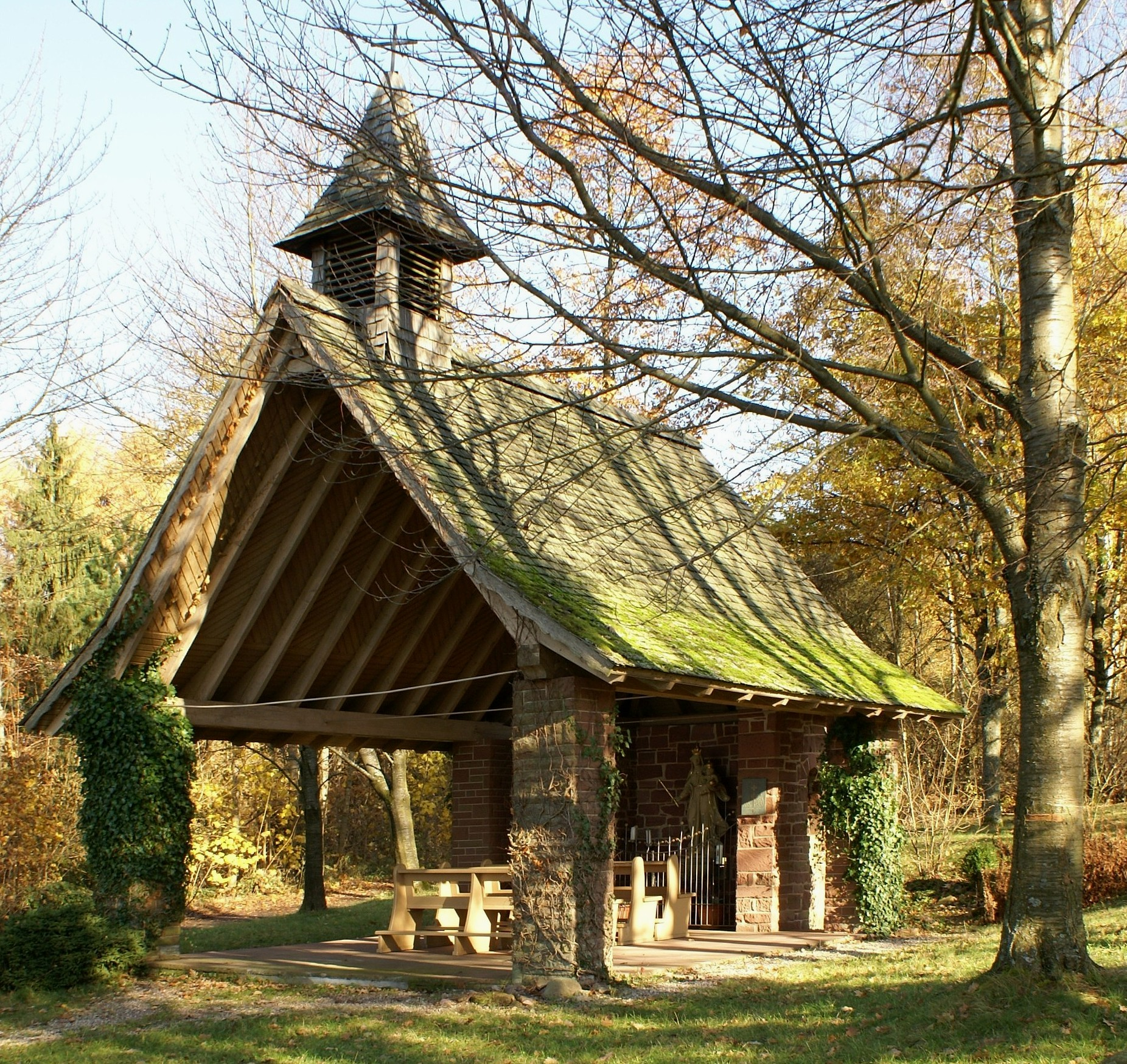
Maria im Aufgang chapel

Bauer founded a Feldkapelle in his home parish in 1984, named Maria im Aufgang (Mary rising). It was consecrated on the feast Assumption of Mary. Each year a procession and prayer have been held on this feast, which Bauer often attended. The chapel became a destination of the Fränkischer Marienweg long-distance trail in 2019.

== Awards and honours ==
Bauer received several regional plaques and medals, and was honorary member of many associations and institutions such as choirs, pilgrimages and charities. He was also an honorary member of the Catholic fraternity KDStV Gothia Würzburg, one of the organizations making up the Cartellverband, and of the Dommusikverein Würzburg. The rehearsal hall of the cathedral choirs in Würzburg was named after him.

Major honours included:

- Bavarian Order of Merit
- 1995: Order of Merit of the Federal Republic of Germany
- 2001: Honorary citizen of Mömbris
- 2003: Frankenwürfel

Catholic Church titles
Preceded by Vicente Navarra	Titular Bishop of Velefi; 1988–2024	Succeeded by Vacant
