= Frankfurt homosexual trials =

Trials of homosexual men in West Germany (1950–51)

The Frankfurt Homosexual Trials were a series of criminal trials in Frankfurt that took place in 1950 and 1951. Criminal proceedings were initiated against over 200 people during the trials, beginning a wave of persecution against homosexuals across Germany. The trials marked the end of the relative restraint exercised by the judiciary in criminalizing homosexuality after the end of World War II in Europe.

== Background ==
=== The gay community in Frankfurt ===
While a gay community existed in Frankfurt prior to the Second World War, the Nazi party's seizure of power, especially after the Night of the Long Knives, led to a massive persecution of gay men, and the visible gay scene in Frankfurt disappeared completely. After WWII, the community was rebuilt, with well-known meeting places including the Kleist Casino in the Freßgass 6 and the Felsenkeller in Luginsland 1. The Felsenkeller had a license that allowed men to dance together there. The first organization of homosexuals, the "Association for Humanitarian Lifestyle" (Verein für humanitäre Lebensgestaltung, or VhL), had a seat in the Felsenkeller. A prostitution hotspot emerged in the Taunusanlage park, where 80 to 100 male prostitutes offered their services. Although homosexual activity was a criminal offense under German law, the enforcement of those laws was initially lax. This led many people in Frankfurt's gay community to believe that the relevant criminal provisions were no longer applicable.

=== Legal background ===
In 1950s, Paragraph 175 (also known as § 175), a provision in the German Criminal Code (StGB) which criminalized homosexuality, was still in effect. The code had remained unchanged since it was amended to be more severe in 1935. At that time the Nazi party extended § 175, so that criminality included all "lewd" acts, which in extreme cases could also be interpreted as eye contact between men. Section 175a of the Criminal Code, also newly inserted in 1935, stipulated that the offence could incur a sentence of up to 10 years.

After the war, the Allied Control Council suspended a number of Nazi-era laws and legislative changes. The regulations of § 175 and § 175a remained in force and were incorporated into the Federal German Criminal Code in 1949. In a general clause, the Control Council had decreed that any amendment of criminal law made by the National Socialists should be checked on a case-by-case basis to determine whether they conformed to the rule of law. This also applied to Section 175a of the Criminal Code.

== Investigations ==
The wave of persecution in Frankfurt was triggered by the investigation of 17-year-old prostitute Otto Blankenstein, who was arrested on July 16, 1950, in Frankfurt for "commercial same-sex prostitution". The investigating public prosecutor, Dr. Fritz Thiede, personally took over the management of the police investigations. Under interrogation, Blankenstein claimed to have had sexual contact with at least 70 clients over 200 times. He became a key witness, however, crown witnesses were not yet enshrined in German law. He was such an important source of information for the police and the public prosecutor that he was placed in special custody instead of prison. Blankenstein either remained in the police prison or he was imprisoned in the Preungesheim correctional facility. At times during the investigation, Blankenstein was questioned daily. Thiede temporarily relocated his office to the Police Headquarters. The public prosecutor's office justified its considerable investigative effort to the public with the protection of minors and later with blackmail. The latter is considered to have been a definite pretext, as it was never mentioned as the reason for arrest.

The men named by Blankenstein were summoned, processed for identification and also photographed, and these photos were shown to other prostitutes. This resulted in 173 investigations against 214 people, of whom around 50 were arrested, many of them minors, resulting in 42 indictments. The investigations initiated by Blankenstein's statements were joined by others, so that Thiede finally conducted 240 investigations into a total of 280 people for violations of Section 175 of the Criminal Code. Over the course of the investigation, 100 people were arrested and 75 charges were brought against them by the end of the year. Recent research has supported these numbers, reconstructed by Dieter Schiefelbein.

== The criminal trials ==
=== The trials in autumn 1950 ===
The first trial opened on October 23, 1950. On October 1, 1950, a new version of the Courts Constitution Act had come into force. The Courts Constitution Act provides the framework for which a judge is responsible for a process. The new version of the law was announced on September 12, 1950, in the Bundesgesetzblatt.

Judge Dr. Kurt Ronimi was known for prosecuting cases of violations of Paragraph 175 of the Criminal Code during the Nazi era, and had convicted around 400 men under the legal code. Romini relied on the previously valid version of the law from 1937 and referred all trials of this series to the Chamber of the Regional Court Frankfurt am Main (it was a Court of Aldermen). However, this was no longer permissible in October 1950 and the proceedings should have been distributed to different chambers in accordance with the business distribution plan. This violated the principle of the "Statutory Judge" according to the Article 101, Paragraph 1, Clause 2 of the Basic Law. This argument was also taken up by contemporary press reports, but not the judiciary.

The local press, especially the Frankfurter Neue Presse and the Frankfurter Rundschau, reported extensively on the trials. The reporting was initially approving of the law enforcement authorities, which affected the opinion of the readership. A reader survey showed broad approval of Paragraph 175 and the convictions. Due to the clear evidence, the trials ended with convictions in almost all cases.

=== Changed public discussion ===
As the number of trials increased, public opinion turned. It became clear that Blankenstein was acting as a witness for the state (testifying in exchange for more lenient treatment or immunity), which was not permitted under contemporary laws and thus the public reaction was negative. The personality of Blankenstein and thus his credibility as a witness was also increasingly questioned. As a result of these discussions, the first appeal proceedings were initiated. In one case, the defence obtained an order from the Frankfurt Higher Regional Court (Oberlandesgericht) for a psychological report on Blankenstein to be prepared. Blankenstein subsequently refused to testify and the case ended with an acquittal.

The trials had by then attracted nationwide attention. The press, in particular Der Spiegel and the Frankfurter Rundschau, were generally skeptical about the purpose of and motivation for the trials. Roger Nash Baldwin, one of the co-founders of the American Civil Liberties Union, said that it was "incomprehensible that such proceedings against innocent adults in the 20th century are still possible", and complained directly to the Federal Ministry of the Interior, which said it was not responsible.

The lawyer Erich Schmidt-Leichner brought about a decisive turning point in the series of trials. As the criminal defense lawyer for a homeless man accused of same-sex prostitution with minors, his strategy in his main hearing on November 8, 1950, was to doubt the legality of the instruction of the Frankfurt District Court President. According to the Court President's orders, Judge Kurt Ronimi was alone entrusted with the 150 court hearings in accordance with §§ 175, 175a. Upon Schmidt-Leichner's accusation, the hearing against his client was adjourned. Together with court reporter Rudolf Eims, Schmidt-Leichner then introduced his criticism of the Frankfurt judiciary to the press. Presumably, the two men knew each other from meetings of the homophile Association for Humanitarian Lifestyle (VhL) in the Frankfurt bar Felsenkeller, whose first chairman was the homosexual activist Heinz Meininger.

At the end of December 1950, an anonymous threatening letter was delivered to the chief public prosecutor, Hans-Krafft Kosterlitz. As a result, the public prosecutor's office suspected Schmidt-Leichner of having written the murder threat, since they apparently attributed the defense lawyer to circles of the homophile movement. However, the investigation was eventually dropped due to lack of evidence. The author of the letter may have been “connected with the circle of lawyers and journalists fighting legally and in public”, and its drastic choice of words shows “how repressive the investigative pressure exerted in the Main metropolis was perceived by those affected.” According to Speier, the letter is the manifestation of the "desperate-aggressive[...] radicalism and bitterness" of those affected by the persecution:

I would also like to draw your attention to the fact that a connection has been formed among those who have been persecuted by Kosterlitz and their families with the aim of getting rid of this man if the persecutions that have been going on for months are not stopped. This is not an act of cheap revenge, but an act of self-defense by people who were driven to a degree of despair by K[osterlitz] that does not let them shy away from the consequences of such an act. The elimination of a sadist who has killed no fewer than 6 people is not murder but a necessity and an obligation to those he continues to threaten. You don't let rabid dogs run around—you beat them to death! Perhaps such an act of self-defense will finally prompt the Bonn bureaucracy to consider whether a public prosecutor should be allowed to carry out private manhunts 6 years after Hitler's downfall on the basis of National Socialist criminal provisions, which can only be paralleled in the persecution of Jews in the past epoch find.

The threatening letter addressed to Kosterlitz was not only sent to the Federal President Theodor Heuss, but also leaked to the Frankfurter Rundschau and the Frankfurter Neue Presse. Although the Frankfurter Neue Presse categorized the actions of the anonymous threatening letter writer as unacceptable, they also gave a broad description of the content of the letter and advocated sympathy towards the persecuted homosexuals, professing an understanding of their powerlessness before the Frankfurt courts. The motives of the writer of the threatening letter were thus outlined as easily understandable. Thus, the pressure to justify the public prosecutor's office and the court towards politicians and the public appears to have increased steadily at the turn of 1950/51.

In early 1951, Ronimi was promoted to the Landgericht Hanau. There he immediately made further sentences under Paragraph 175. His successor in Frankfurt, Dr. Brückner, dissolved the chamber's special jurisdiction constructed by Ronimi, and had public prosecutor Thiede cede 60 investigations to colleagues and discontinue 60 more - a high number that made "Thiede's zeal appear even more sinister". In Frankfurt, the wave of persecution came to an end.

=== Trial of Blankenstein ===
The trial of Blankenstein took place on February 15, 1951. The public prosecutor's office and the court did their best to prove that an unlawful leniency agreement had not been made. Since Ronimi and Thiede were largely eliminated from the event, their possible agreements with Blankenstein no longer protected the former key witness. The criminal proceedings were heard in public, which was very unusual in proceedings under the Youth Courts Act. Blankenstein was sentenced to two and a half years' youth penalty, which was quite high. Out of seven months spent in pre-trial detention, only four were credited to him as time served.

== Consequences and reactions ==
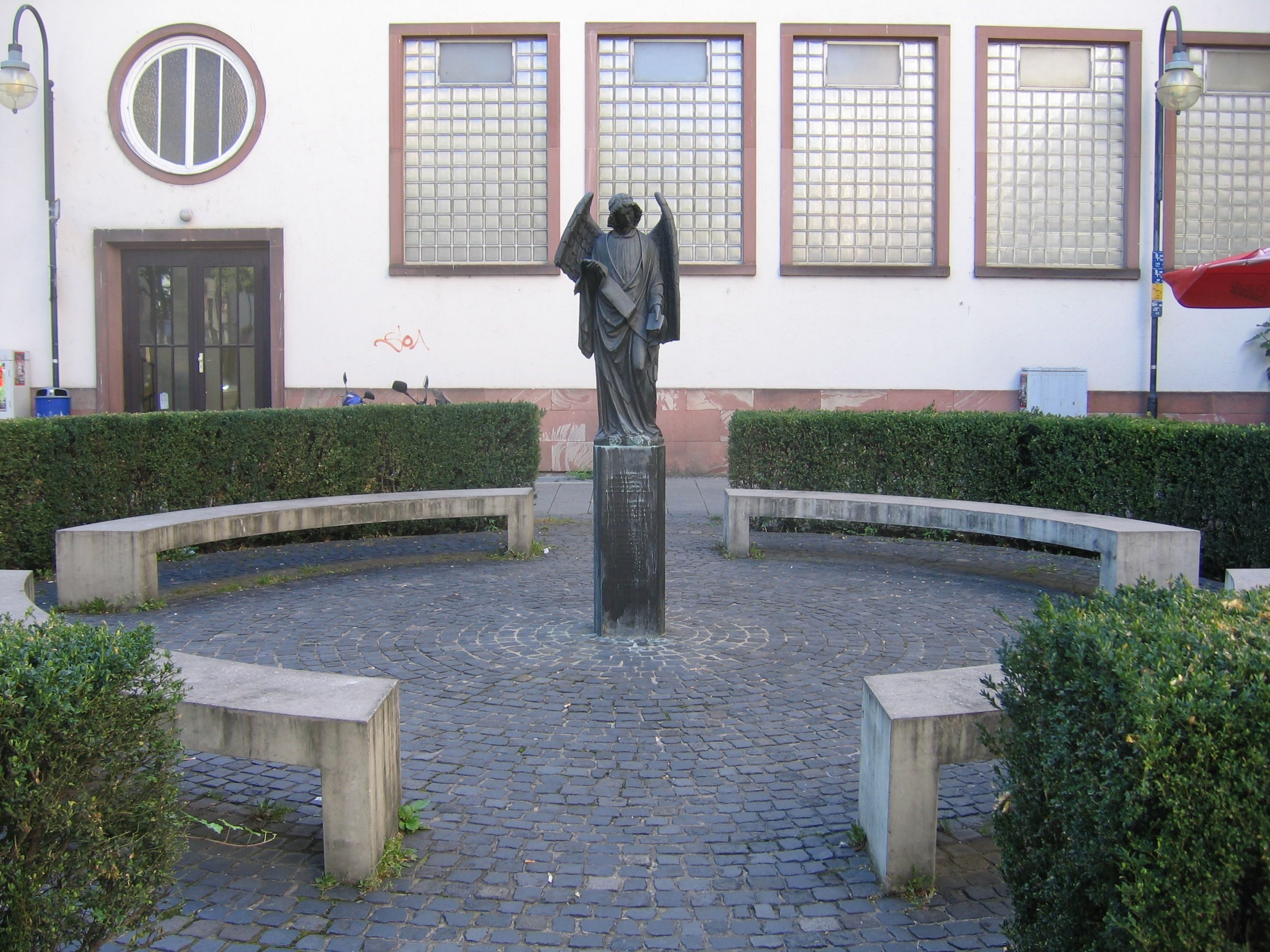
The Frankfurter Engel monument to the victims of the trials.

The Frankfurt Homosexual Trials in the Adenauer era marked a turning point that ended the relatively lax enforcement after the Second World War, and began a period of more intense persecution of homosexuals in Germany. Omar G. Encarnación, a professor of Political Studies at Bard College, called the trials "the most vicious episode of gay persecution in postwar Europe."

A total of six of the persecuted men committed suicide: a 19-year-old jumped from the Goethe Tower, a dental technician and his friend poisoned themselves with illuminating gas. However, current research assumes only two suicides were related to the trials. Many of the accused were harmed professionally or socially. Others fled abroad.

The psychiatrist Reinhard Redhardt examined some of the individuals involved in the trials and prepared a study about it. This is accompanied by an appendix, which contains biographical sketches for some of the examined.

The trials were the inspiration for the play The Right to Self by Rolf Italiaander, which premiered on April 2, 1952, at the Hamburg Kammerspiele. The play's premiere marked the first time since the Second World War ended that homosexuality was discussed on a German stage.

In 1994, the Frankfurter Engel memorial was installed in the vicinity of the Frankfurt courthouse, to commemorate those persecuted under anti-homosexual legislation.

== Literature ==
=== Sources ===
- Kraushaar, Elmar: Unzucht vor Gericht. In: Elmar Kraushaar (Hrsg.): Hundert Jahre schwul. Eine Revue. Berlin 1997. ISBN 3 87134 307 2, p. 60–69.
- Redhardt, Reinhard: Zur gleichgeschlechtlichen männlichen Prostitution. In: Studien zur Homosexualität = Beiträge zur Sexualforschung 5 (1954), p. 22–72.
- Schiefelbein, Dieter: Wiederbeginn der juristischen Verfolgung homosexueller Männer in der Bundesrepublik Deutschland. Die Homosexuellen-Prozesse in Frankfurt am Main 1950/51. In: Zeitschrift für Sexualforschung 5/1 (1992), p. 59–73.
- Speier, Daniel: Die Frankfurter Homosexuellenprozesse zu Beginn der Ära Adenauer – eine chronologische Darstellung. In: Mitteilungen der Magnus-Hirschfeld-Gesellschaft 61/62 (2018), p. 47–72.
- Velke, Marcus: Verfolgung und Diskriminierung – Männliche Homosexualität. In: Kirsten Plötz und Marcus Velke: Aufarbeitung von Verfolgung und Repression lesbischer und schwuler Lebensweisen in Hessen 1945–1985. Bericht im Auftrag des Hessischen Ministeriums für Soziales und Integration zum Projekt „Aufarbeitung der Schicksale der Opfer des ehemaligen § 175 StGB in Hessen im Zeitraum 1945 bis 1985" (2018), p. 134–265, 275–276. [URL: https://soziales.hessen.de/sites/default/files/media/hsm/forschungsbericht_aufarbeitung_verfolgung.pdf].

=== Further reading ===
- H. T. Riethausen: Judasengel. Frankfurt 2016. ISBN 978-3-944485-12-6

== Documentary film ==
- Das Ende des Schweigens by Van-Tien Hoang.
