= Mönchberg (Verwaltungsgemeinschaft) =

- Verwaltungsgemeinschaft
- Location of Mönchberg within Miltenberg district
- Interactive map of Mönchberg
- Location within Germany Location within Bavaria
- Coordinates: 49°48′N 9°16′E
- Country: Germany
- State: Bavaria
- Admin. region: Lower Franconia
- District: Miltenberg
- Seat: Mönchberg
- Subdivisions: 2 municipalities

Area
  - Total: 36.56 km^{2} (14.12 sq mi)

Population (2025-12-31)
  - Total: 4,262
  - Density: 116.6/km^{2} (301.9/sq mi)
- Time zone: UTC+01:00 (CET)
  - Summer (DST): UTC+02:00 (CEST)
- Website: www.moenchberg.de

Mönchberg is a Verwaltungsgemeinschaft (municipal association) in the district of Miltenberg in Bavaria, Germany. Its seat is in Mönchberg.

It consists of the following municipalities:

1. Mönchberg
2. Röllbach
