= Anneliese Michel =

Woman who died from malnutrition after attempted exorcisms

- Born: Anna Elisabeth Michel; 21 September 1952; Leiblfing, Bavaria, West Germany
- Died: 1 July 1976 (aged 23); Klingenberg am Main, Bavaria, West Germany
- Cause of death: Malnutrition and dehydration
- Cause of death: Homicide
- Resting place: Klingenberg am Main, Bavaria, Germany
- Known for: Death as a result of attempted exorcism

Anna Elisabeth "Anneliese" Michel (21 September 1952 – 1 July 1976) was a German woman who underwent 67 Catholic exorcism rites during the year before her death. She died of malnutrition, for which her parents and the priest who performed the exorcism were convicted of negligent homicide. She was diagnosed with epileptic psychosis (temporal lobe epilepsy) and manic depression (bipolar disorder), and had a history of psychiatric treatment that proved ineffective.

When Michel was 16, she experienced a seizure and was diagnosed with psychosis caused by temporal lobe epilepsy. Shortly thereafter, she was diagnosed with depression and was treated by a psychiatric hospital. By the time that she was 20, she had become intolerant of various religious objects and began to hear voices. Her condition worsened despite medication, and she became suicidal, also displaying other symptoms, for which she took medication as well. After taking psychiatric medications for five years failed to improve her symptoms, Michel and her family became convinced she was possessed by a demon. As a result, her family appealed to the Catholic Church for an exorcism. While rejected at first, two priests got permission from the local bishop, Josef Stangl, to perform the exorcism in 1975. The priests began performing exorcisms and the family stopped consulting doctors. Michel stopped eating food and died of malnourishment and dehydration after 67 exorcism sessions. Michel's parents and the two Catholic priests were found guilty of negligent homicide and were sentenced to six years in jail (reduced to three years of probation), as well as a fine.

Several religious horror films are based on her story, including the 2005 film The Exorcism of Emily Rose, the 2006 film Requiem, and the 2011 film Anneliese: The Exorcist Tapes.

== Early life ==
Born Anna Elisabeth Michel on 21 September 1952 in Leiblfing, Bavaria, West Germany, to a Roman Catholic family, Michel and her three sisters were raised by their parents, Joseph and Anna. She attended Mass twice a week. When she was 16, she experienced a severe convulsion and was diagnosed with temporal lobe epilepsy. In 1973, Michel attended the University of Würzburg. Her classmates later described her as "withdrawn and very religious".

== Psychiatric treatment ==
In June 1970, Michel had a third seizure at the psychiatric hospital where she had been staying. She was prescribed anti-convulsion drugs for the first time, including Dilantin, which did not alleviate the problem. She described seeing "devil faces" at various times of the day. That same month, she was prescribed Aolept, which is similar to chlorpromazine and is used in the treatment of various psychotic conditions, including schizophrenia, disturbed behavior, and delusions. By 1973, she began experiencing depression, hallucinated while praying and complained about hearing voices telling her that she was "damned" and would "rot in hell." Michel's treatment in a psychiatric hospital did not improve her health and her depression worsened. Long-term treatment did not help, either, and she grew increasingly frustrated with her medical care after having taken pharmacological drugs for five years. Michel became intolerant of Christian sacred places and objects, such as the crucifix.

Michel visited the unauthorized shrine of San Damiano in Piacenza, with a family friend who regularly organized Christian pilgrimages to Italy. Her escort in Piacenza was convinced that she was suffering from demonic possession because she was unable to walk past a crucifix and refused to drink the water of a Christian holy spring.

Anneliese told me—and Frau Hein confirmed this—that she was unable to enter the shrine. She approached it with the greatest hesitation, then said that the soil burned like fire and she simply could not stand it. She then walked around the shrine in a wide arc and tried to approach it from the back. She looked at the people who were kneeling in the area surrounding the little garden, and it seemed to her that while praying they were gnashing their teeth. She got as far as the edge of the little garden, then she had to turn back. Coming from the front again, she had to avert her glance from the picture of Christ [in the chapel of the house]. She made it several times to the garden, but could not get past it. She also noted that she could no longer look at medals or pictures of saints; they sparkled so immensely that she could not stand it.

— Father Ernst Alt

Michel's mother said that she saw stigmata on her daughter. Michel believed she could communicate with Mary, mother of Jesus.

Michel's family and community became convinced that she was possessed and consulted several priests to request an exorcism. The priests declined, recommended the continuation of medical treatment and informed the family that exorcisms required the bishop's permission. In the Catholic Church, official approval for an exorcism is granted when the subject strictly meets the set criteria and is considered to be suffering from possession (infestatio) and under demonic control. Intense dislike for religious objects and supernatural powers are some of the first indications.

Michel worsened physically and displayed aggression, injured herself, drank her own urine and ate insects. In November 1973, Michel began treatment with Tegretol, an anti-seizure drug and mood stabilizer. She was prescribed antipsychotic drugs during the course of the religious rites and consumed them frequently until some time before her death. Despite taking these neuroleptic medications, Michel's symptoms worsened and she began "growling obscenities, screaming guttural curses, and raving wildly."

== Exorcism ==
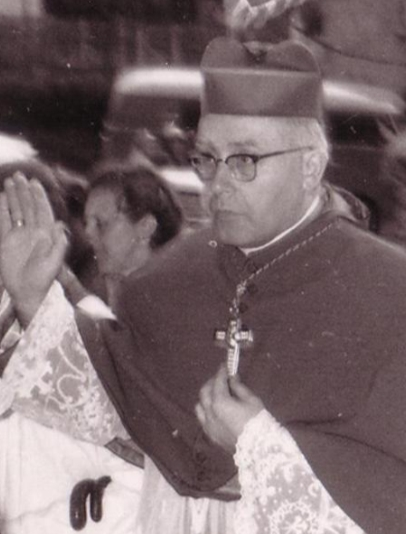
Bishop Josef Stangl, who approved the exorcism, in a May 1959 photo

A family friend of the Michels requested the elderly Jesuit priest Adolf Rodewyk to visit Anneliese, but he declined due to his old age and put the family in contact with another Jesuit. In September 1974, the local priest who had visited her, Father Ernst Alt, declared that Michel "didn't look like an epileptic" and that he did not observe her experiencing seizures. However, between July and August 1975, Alt came to believe that she was suffering from demonic possession and urged Josef Stangl, the Bishop of Würzburg, to allow an exorcism. In a letter to Alt in 1975, Michel wrote, "I am nothing; everything about me is vanity. What should I do? I have to improve. You pray for me" and also once told him, "I want to suffer for other people [...] but this is so cruel." In August 1975, Stangl granted Father Alt the permission of performing the "small exorcism" upon Michel, i.e. Pope Leo XIII's Exorcism against Satan and the Apostate Angels, a rite which any priest could recite as it doesn't require episcopal approval.

In September 1975, Father Rodewyk visited Anneliese with Alt and wrote a detailed report of her case to the Bishop Josef Stangl "unintelligible to third parties", arguing in favor of a genuine demonic possession and urging Stangl to allow them to perform the major rite of exorcism. Eventually, Stangl granted Salvatorian priest Arnold Renz permission to conduct an exorcism according to the Roman Ritual (Latin: Rituale Romanum), but ordered total secrecy. (Note: "In Nov '73, exorcism expert Jesuit priest Adolf Rodewyk examined Michel and recommended exorcism, which Stangl authorized in Sept '75.") Renz performed the first session on 24 September. Michel began increasingly speaking about "dying to atone for the wayward youth of the day and the apostate priests of the modern church." Her parents stopped consulting doctors at her request and relied solely on the exorcism rites. A total of 67 exorcism sessions, one or two each week lasting up to four hours each, were performed over approximately ten months in 1975 and 1976. Toward the end of her life, Michel began to refuse food.

== Death ==
Killing of Anneliese Michel
- Date: 1 July 1976; 50 years ago
- Location: Klingenberg am Main, Bavaria, West Germany
- Type: Homicide by malnutrition and dehydration
- Motive: Attempted exorcism
- Organized by: Joseph Michel; Anna Michel; Ernst Alt; Arnold Renz
- Verdict: Guilty
- Convictions: Negligent homicide
- Sentence: Three year suspended sentence

On 1 July 1976, Michel died in her home. The autopsy report stated the cause of death as malnutrition and dehydration resulting from almost a year in a state of near starvation while the rites of exorcism were performed. She weighed 30 kilograms (66 lb), suffered broken knees from continuous genuflections, was unable to move without assistance and was reported to have contracted pneumonia.

== Prosecution ==
After an investigation, the state prosecutor maintained that Michel's death could have been prevented as late as one week before she died.

In 1976, the state charged Michel's parents and priests Ernst Alt and Arnold Renz with negligent homicide. The parents were defended by famed Nuremberg trials defense attorney Erich Schmidt-Leichner and the priests' defense counsel were paid by the church. The state recommended that none of the involved parties be jailed; instead, the recommended sentence for the priests was a fine, while the prosecution concluded that the parents should be exempt from punishment as they had "suffered enough," a mitigating legal factor in German penal law (cf. § 60 StGB).

On July 14, 1977, a New York Times article reported the Aschaffenburg prosecutor had announced that two Roman Catholic priests had been charged with negligent homicide in the death of Anneliese Michel, who had undergone exorcism a year previously.

=== Trial ===
The trial began on 30 March 1978 in the district court and drew intense interest. Doctors testified that Michel was not possessed, stating that the manifestations of demonic possession were a psychological effect of her strict religious upbringing as well as her epilepsy. Schmidt-Leichner argued that the exorcism was legal and that the German constitution protected citizens in the unrestricted exercise of their religious beliefs. The defense played tapes recorded at the exorcism sessions, sometimes featuring what was claimed to be "demons arguing" to assert their claim that Michel was possessed. Both priests claimed that six demons identified themselves as Lucifer, Cain, Judas Iscariot, Nero, Adolf Hitler, and an evil priest named Fleischmann. They also stated that Michel was finally freed of demonic possession resulting from the exorcism just before her death.

Bishop Stangl said that he was not aware of Michel's alarming health condition when he approved of the exorcism and did not testify in court. In April 1978, the Michels and the two priests were convicted of negligent homicide but were given suspended prison sentences, and were ordered to share the costs of the legal proceedings. The sentences have been described as stiffer than those requested by the prosecutor, who had asked that the priests only be fined and that the parents be found guilty but not punished. By approving the ancient exorcism rite, the Catholic Church drew public and media attention.

== Exhumation and aftermath ==
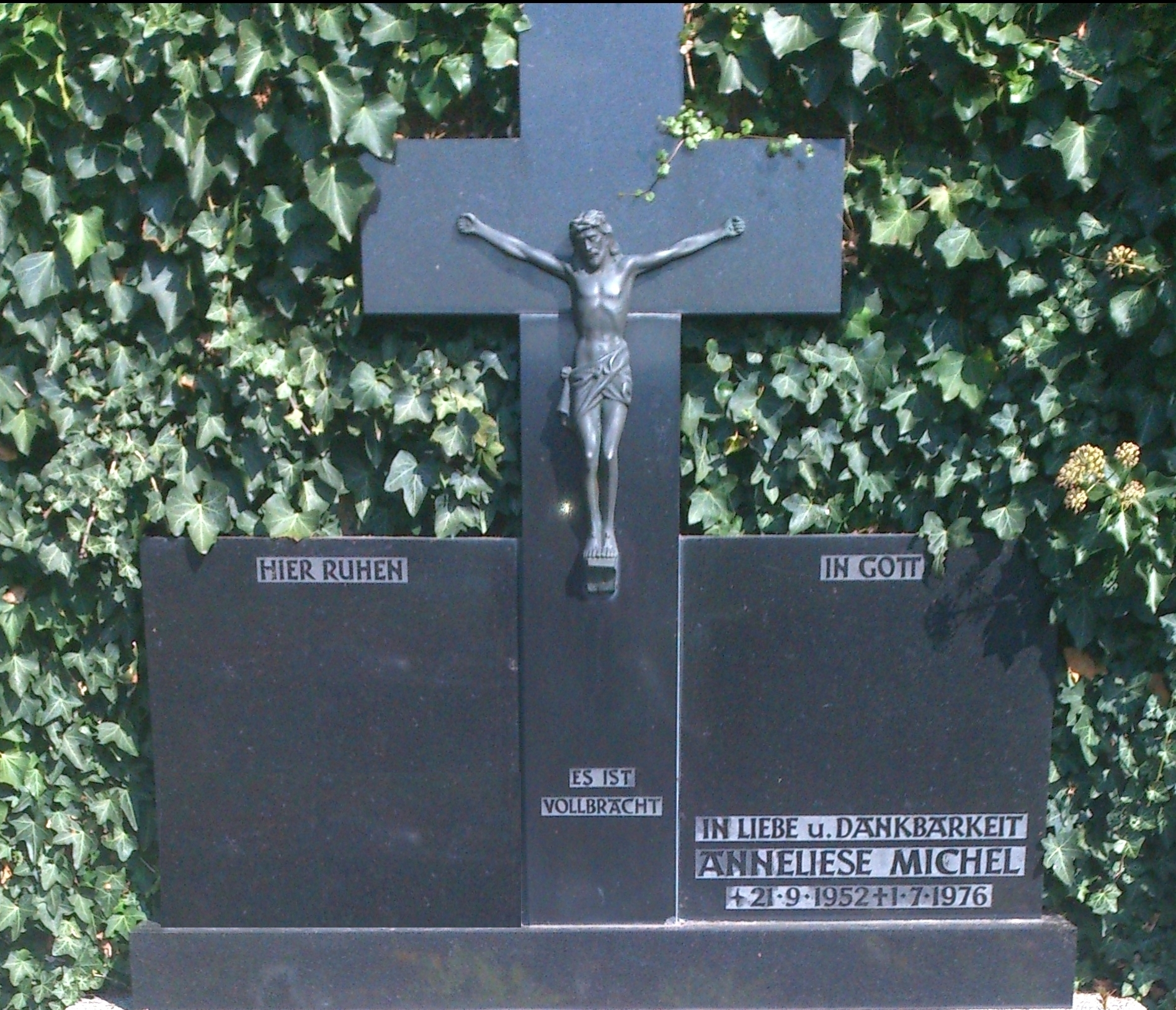
Michel's gravesite, which became a place of pilgrimage

After the trial, the Michels asked the authorities for permission to exhume the remains of their daughter because she had been buried in undue hurry in a cheap coffin. Almost two years after the burial, on 25 February 1978, her remains were replaced in a new oak coffin lined with tin. The official reports state that the body bore signs consistent with deterioration of a corpse of that age. The family and the priests were discouraged from viewing Michel's remains. Father Renz later stated that he had been prevented from entering the mortuary. Michel's gravesite remains a pilgrimage site as she is "revered by small groups of Catholics who believe she atoned for wayward priests and sinful youth."

The number of officially sanctioned exorcisms decreased in Germany following the incident.

Michel's father, Joseph Michel, died in 1999. In a 2006 interview, Anna Michel stated that she did not regret her actions, saying, "I know we did the right thing because I saw the sign of Christ in her hands". On 6 June 2013, a fire engulfed the house where Michel had lived. Although some locals attributed the fire to the exorcism case, the arsonist turned out to be a member of the local fire brigade .

== See also ==
- Exorcism in Christianity
- Religion and schizophrenia
