= Velefi =

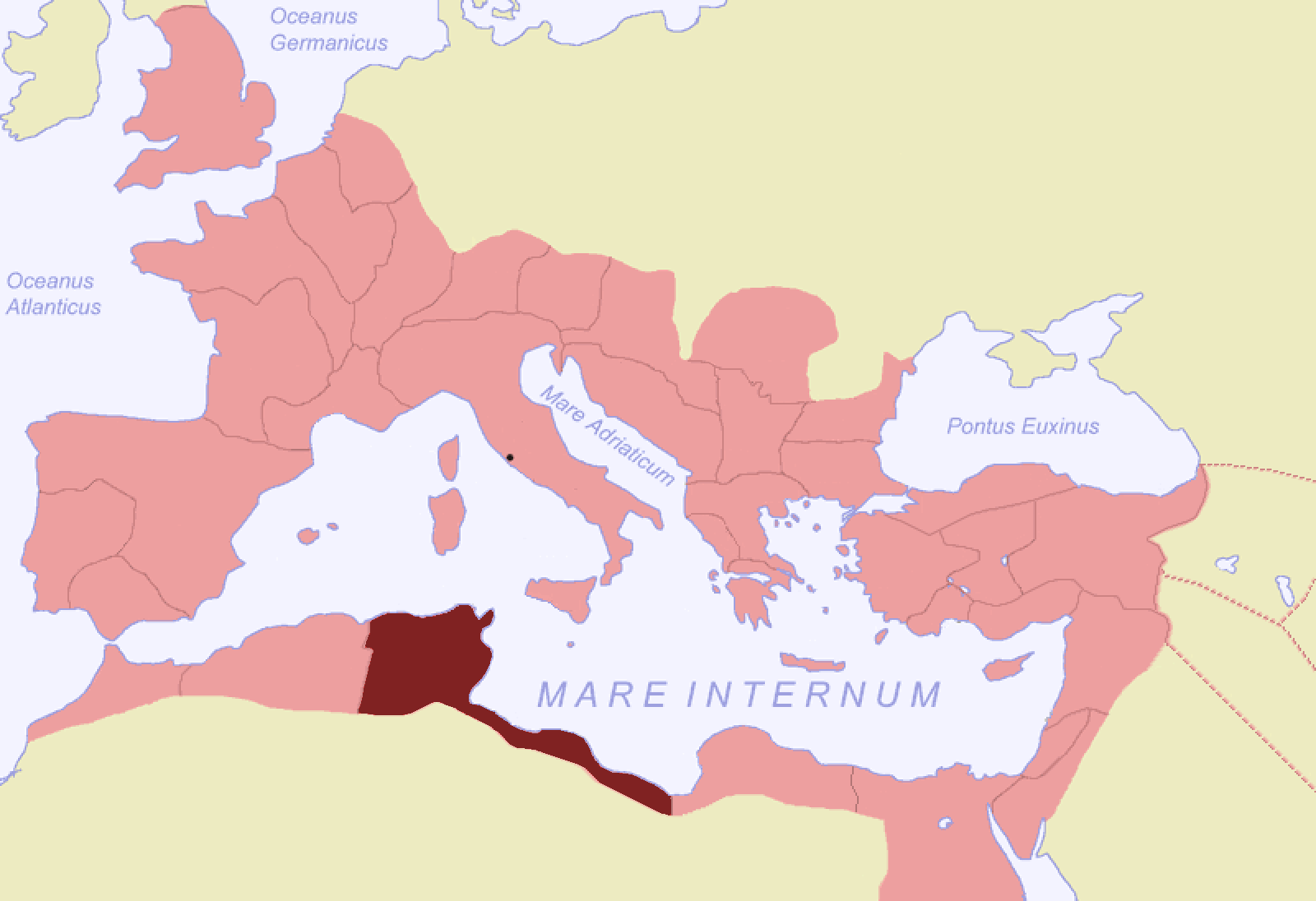
Africa proconsularis SPQR.

Velefi was the name of an ancient town of Roman North Africa.

== Location ==
Velefi is tentatively given as the ruins of Fedj-Es-Soyoud. The town is shown at Segment grid 3C3 of the Tabula Peutingeriana.

== Bishopric ==
Velefi was also the seat of an ancient episcopal see of the Roman province of Numidia. One bishop is known of this African diocese, Ianuario (Gennaro), who participated in the synod meeting in Carthage in 484 called by the Vandal king Huneric, and who was later exiled.

Today the diocese of Velefi survives as a titular bishopric. Bishops

- Ianuario (mentioned in 484)
- João Batista Muniz, C.SS.R. † (9 December 1966 – 16 March 1971 resigned)
- Jorge Bernal Vargas, LC (7 December 1973 – 15 February 1978 resigned)
- Vicente Macanan Navarra (23 April 1979 – 21 November 1987 appointed bishop of Kabankalan)
- Helmut Bauer, 11 July 1988 to 2008

Velefi is today a titular bishopric of the Roman Catholic Church, with the ancient bishops' seat in Numidia.
