= Erich Schmidt-Leichner =

German lawyer (1910–1983)

- Born: 14 October 1910
- Died: 17 March 1983 (aged 72)
- Occupation: Lawyer

Erich Schmidt-Leichner (14 October 1910 – 17 March 1983) was a German lawyer who made a name as a distinguished defense counsel at the Nuremberg trials (1945–1946), as assistant counsel in the Flick Trial and the IG Farben Trial, as well as main counsel in the Ministries Trial.

He distinguished himself again as defense counsel in the 1950 - 1951 Frankfurt homosexual trials. In the early 1960s, he represented Werner Heyde, a chief accused in Aktion T4, the involuntary euthanasia program in Nazi Germany. Starting in October 1966, he represented Franz Six who had been found guilty in the 1947–1948 Einsatzgruppen Trial, and was being reinvestigated for crimes committed by the Reichssicherheitshauptamt (RSHA).

In 1978, in the Klingenberg Case, which attracted international attention, he was defense counsel for the parents of Anneliese Michel, a German woman who underwent 67 Catholic exorcism rites during the year before her death. A court found that she had died of malnutrition and medical neglect, for which her parents and two priests were found guilty and convicted of negligent homicide.
