= WIKA =

German equipment manufacturing company

WIKA Alexander Wiegand SE & Co. KG

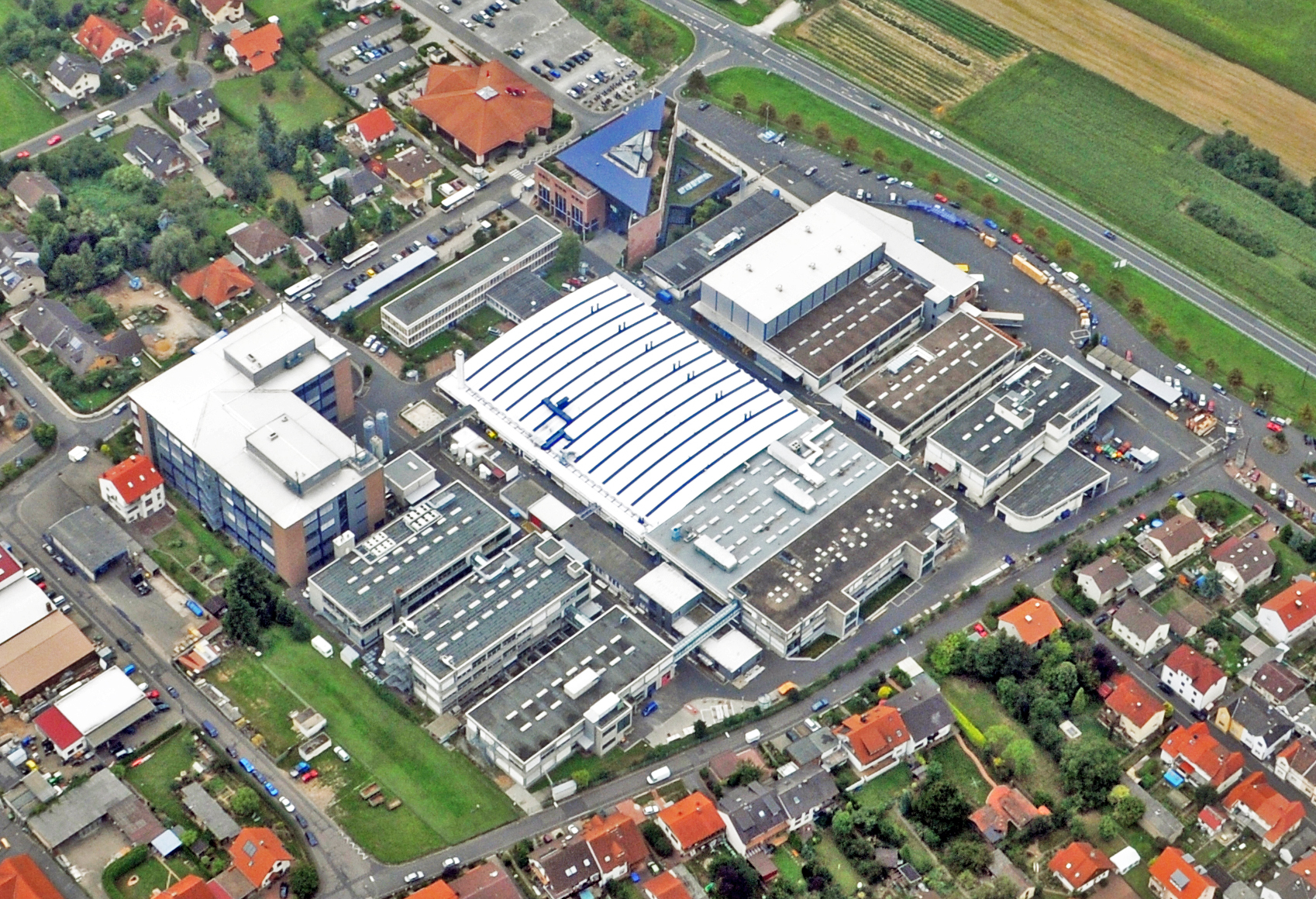
- WIKA main establishment in Klingenberg
- Type: Societas Europaea
- Industry: Measuring instruments
- Founded: 1946
- Headquarters: Klingenberg am Main, Germany
- Number of employees: 11,200 (2023)
- Website: www.wika.com

WIKA Alexander Wiegand SE & Co. KG is a company which manufactures pressure and temperature measuring equipment.

As of financial year 2024, the company employed about 11,200 people at its 45 subsidiaries and production sites worldwide. Its turnover was about €1.3 billion (USD 1.5 billion). The company was established in 1946 in the town Klingenberg am Main, located in the district of Lower Franconia in Bavaria. It is headquartered and has its main industrial establishment there since then.

== History ==
The name of the company WIKA was combined from the initial letters of the names of its founders Alexander Wiegand and Philipp Kachel. In 1956 Kachel left the company and founded his own business to produce thermometers. WIKA is still owned and chaired by a descendant of Alexander Wiegand. His son Konrad Wiegand took over in 1951. After the death of Konrad Wiegand in 1967 Ursula Wiegand, his widow, became chief of the company. Her son, who bears the same name as his grandfather, followed in 1996.

The production in 1946 began with mechanical pressure and temperature gauges. The company held its position as one of the world market leaders also after the classical manometry was more and more replaced by electronic pressure and temperature measuring and display devices. In 2010 WIKA produced more than 43 Million units. In 1986 the company was reunited with the Kachel-thermometer-factory.

== Products ==
WIKA analog high-pressure gauge from the 1990s, with a measuring range of 0–600 bar.

The company manufactures around 800 pressure and temperature measurement products in thousands of variants, as well as level, flow & force instrumentation. The pressure measuring ranges extend between vacuum and 15,000 bar. WIKA temperature products can measure and display temperatures in the spectrum between minus 250 and plus 1800 degrees Celsius.
