= Röllbach =

- Municipality
- Coat of arms

- Location of Röllbach within Miltenberg district
- Interactive map of Röllbach
- Location within Germany Location within Bavaria
- Coordinates: 49°46′23″N 09°14′45″E
- Country: Germany
- State: Bavaria
- Admin. region: Unterfranken
- District: Miltenberg
- Municipal assoc.: Mönchberg

Government
  - Mayor (2020–26): Michael Schwing (CSU)

Area
  - Total: 12.41 km^{2} (4.79 sq mi)
- Elevation: 219 m (719 ft)

Population (2025-12-31)
  - Total: 1,758
  - Density: 141.7/km^{2} (366.9/sq mi)
- Time zone: UTC+01:00 (CET)
  - Summer (DST): UTC+02:00 (CEST)
- Postal codes: 63934
- Dialling codes: 09372
- Vehicle registration: MIL
- Website: www.roellbach.de

Röllbach (German pronunciation: [ˈʁœlbax]) is a municipality in the Miltenberg district in the Regierungsbezirk of Lower Franconia (Unterfranken) in Bavaria, Germany and a member of the Verwaltungsgemeinschaft (Administrative Community) of Mönchberg.

== Geography ==
=== Location ===
The municipality lies in the Spessart (range), in the Mainviereck (“Main Square”) between Klingenberg, Mönchberg and Großheubach.

== Politics ==
Until 1984, all members of Röllbach municipal council came exclusively from the CSU. Since the 1984 municipal election, the CWR (Christliche Wählergemeinschaft Röllbach, or Christian Voters’ Community) has also been represented on municipal council. At the 2003 Landtag elections, the CSU garnered 74.15% of the second votes.

=== Municipal council ===
The council is made up of 13 council members, counting the part-time mayor, with seats apportioned thus:

	CSU	Christliche Wählergemeinschaft e.V	Total
2002	7	6	13 seats
2008	8	5	13 seats

(as at municipal election held on 2 March 2008)

=== Mayor ===
Röllbach’s mayor is Michael Schwing (CSU). He was first elected in 2020.

=== Coat of arms ===
The municipality’s arms might be described thusly: Gules a pallet argent, dexter a wheel spoked of six of the same, sinister five billets Or, two, one and two.

The arms are based on the Schultheiß’s (roughly, “sheriff’s”) seal from the 18th century. The Wheel of Mainz refers to Electoral Mainz’s former hegemony in the region, while the pallet (narrow vertical stripe) and the billets on the sinister side (i.e., armsbearer’s left, viewer’s right) are drawn from the arms formerly borne by the Barons of Hoheneck, who are known to have been in Röllbach in 1718, and who died out in 1808.

The arms have been borne since 1970.
