= Paul-Werner Scheele =

German prelate and theologian (1928–2019)

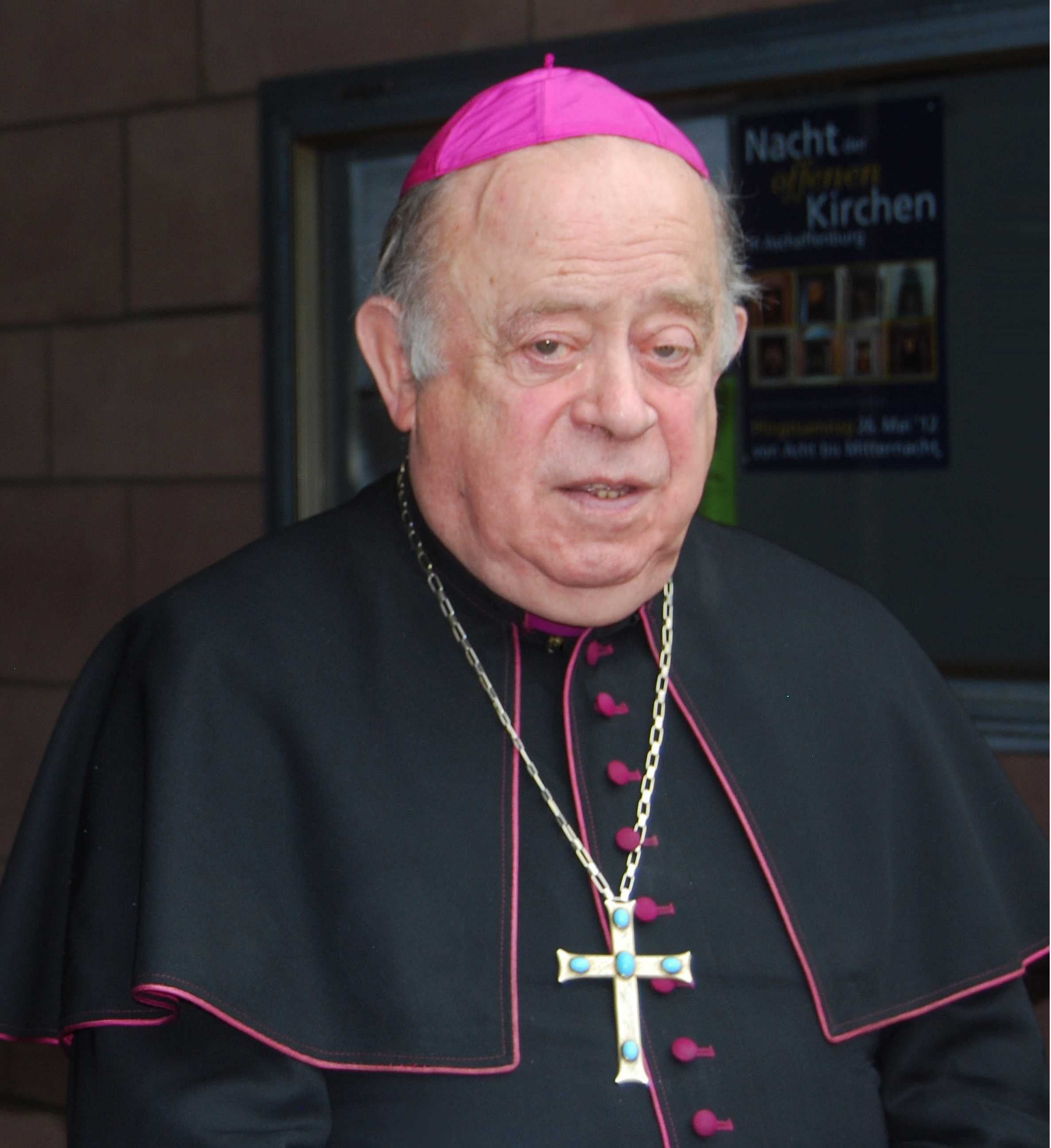
Scheele in May 2012

Paul-Werner Scheele (6 April 1928 – 10 May 2019) was a German Catholic prelate and theologian. Born in Olpe, Scheele was ordained to the priesthood in 1952, and appointed Auxiliary Bishop of Paderborn in 1975. In 1979, he became the Bishop of Würzburg, serving until his retirement in 2003.

Scheele died on 10 May 2019 in Würzburg, at the age of 91.
