= Hohe Warte =

Hohe Warte may refer to the following geographical locations:

In Germany:

- Hohe Warte (ridge), a forested upland in the Fichtel Mountains of North Bavaria
- Hohe Warte (Fichtel Mountains), a hill in the Fichtel Mountains
- Hohe Warte (Schwäbische Alb), a mountain in the Swabian Jura
- 2 mountains in the Thuringian Forest, in Ilm district:
  - Hohe Warte (Elgersburg) (765 m) southwest of Elgersburg
  - Hohe Warte (Frankenhain) (776 m) northeast of Oberhof on the Frankenhainer Gemarkung
- Hohe Warte (Rothaargebirge), a mountain in the Rothaar Mountains
- Hohe Warte (Spessart), a hill in the Spessart
- Hohe Warte (Odenwald), a hill in the Odenwald
- Hohe Warte (Eifel), a mountain in the Eifel
- Hohe Warte (Gießen), forested heights east of Gießen
- a district of Stuttgart-Feuerbach in Stuttgart
- an observation tower in Pforzheim, see Hohe Warte (Pforzheim)
- Hohe Warte (Engelskirchen), a mountain near Engelskirchen in the Oberbergischen Kreis

In Austria:

- Hohe Warte, Vienna, a hill in the 19th Vienna parish of (Döbling)
- Hohe Warte (Carnic Alps), a mountain on the border of Carinthia and Italy
- Hohe Warte (Zillertal Alps), a mountain in the Zillertal Alps
- Hohe Warte (Karwendel), a mountain in the Karwendel, Tyrol
- Hohe Warte (Tux Alps), a mountain in the Tux Alps, Tyrol
- the old name for a hill in the 18th Vienna parish, see Türkenschanze

as well as:

- Hohe Warte Casino Stadium, a stadium in Vienna

See also

- Hohe Wart, a mountain in Bavaria's Spessart hills
- Hohenwarth, Hohenwart, Hohe Wart Tunnel
- Hohenwarte
- Hohenwarthe
