= Hohe Wart =

Highest point
- Elevation: 433 m (1,421 ft)
- Coordinates: 49°54′52″N 9°15′59″E

Geography
- Location within Bavaria
- Location: Bavaria, Germany
- Parent range: Spessart

Geology
- Mountain type: Mittelgebirge

Hohe Wart is a wooded hill of the Spessart range in Bavaria, Germany. It is located in the unincorporated area Forst Hohe Wart, between the districts of Aschaffenburg and Miltenberg.

Hohe Wart is part of the latter and is bordered by Bessenbach, Mespelbrunn, Leidersbach and Sulzbach am Main. The town of Aschaffenburg is the sole land owner on the hill.

Hohe Wart Haus, an inn frequented by day trippers (bikers, hikers) is located on the hill.

Note that the similarly named Hohe Warte is a different hill of the Spessart, located near Rohrbrunn.
