= Dammbach (disambiguation) =

Dammbach is a community of Lower Franconia in Bavaria, Germany.

Dammbach may also refer to:

- Dammbach (Bühler), a river of Baden-Württemberg, Germany, tributary of the Bühler
- Dammbach (Elsava), a river of Bavaria, Germany, tributary of the Elsava
- Dammbach (Rappbode), a river of the Harz in Saxony-Anhalt and Thuringia, Germany, tributary of the Rappbode
