= Hessenthal =

Hessenthal can mean:

- Hessenthal (Mespelbrunn), an Ortsteil of Mespelbrunn, Germany
- Hessental (Schwäbisch Hall) (in the past also: Hessenthal), an Ortsteil of Schwäbisch Hall, Germany
