= Leidersbach =

- Municipality
- Coat of arms

- Location of Leidersbach within Miltenberg district
- Interactive map of Leidersbach
- Location within Germany Location within Bavaria
- Coordinates: 49°54′N 9°13′E
- Country: Germany
- State: Bavaria
- Admin. region: Unterfranken
- District: Miltenberg
- Subdivisions: 4 Ortsteile

Government
  - Mayor (2023–29): Michael Schüßler

Area
  - Total: 19.84 km^{2} (7.66 sq mi)
- Elevation: 196 m (643 ft)

Population (2025-12-31)
  - Total: 4,634
  - Density: 233.6/km^{2} (604.9/sq mi)
- Time zone: UTC+01:00 (CET)
  - Summer (DST): UTC+02:00 (CEST)
- Postal codes: 63849
- Dialling codes: 06028, 06092
- Vehicle registration: MIL
- Website: www.leidersbach.de

Leidersbach (German pronunciation: [ˈlaɪdɐsbax]) is a municipality in the Miltenberg district in the Regierungsbezirk of Lower Franconia (Unterfranken) in Bavaria, Germany.

== Geography ==
=== Location ===
Leidersbach lies roughly 10 km south of Aschaffenburg in the Spessart.

=== Neighbouring communities ===
From the north, clockwise: Forst Hohe Wart (gemeindefreies Gebiet), Mespelbrunn, Heimbuchenthal, Hausen, Kleinwallstadt, Sulzbach am Main.

=== Subdivisions ===
Leidersbach's Ortsteile are Leidersbach, Ebersbach, Roßbach and Volkersbrunn.

== History ==
The Schlossberg, a hill between Ebersbach and Soden, part of neighbouring Sulzbach, was already inhabited in Neolithic times and in the period of the Hallstatt culture (see Attractions).

The founding of the community itself came about in the Middle Ages. By comparing the place with other places with similar name origins, it can be inferred that the places ending in —bach (meaning “brook” in German) were likely founded in Carolingian times in the late 8th century. Ebersbach had its first documentary mention in 1183, and Leidersbach and Roßbach had theirs in 1200. Volkersbrunn's first written reference is from 1248.

Already by this time, these villages belonged to Electoral Mainz. When this state was dissolved by the 1803 Reichsdeputationshauptschluss, the villages passed to the newly formed Principality of Aschaffenburg, with which they passed in 1814 (by this time it had become a part of the Grand Duchy of Frankfurt) to the Kingdom of Bavaria.

=== Amalgamations ===
On 1 January 1972, the formerly self-administering communities of Leidersbach, Ebersbach, Roßbach and Volkersbrunn merged into a new unitary community of Leidersbach.

== Economy ==
Leidersbach business is characterized by the clothing industry. Moreover, there are businesses in software development and marketing as well as an analytical laboratory.

== Attractions ==
=== Altenburg ===
The Altenburg is an oval hilltop fortress on the Schlossberg, right at the municipal border between Sulzbach and Leidersbach. The circular rampart measures about 365 m west to east, with a width of up to 180 m. The remains of the rampart consist of an inner and an outer wall and a moat. Excavations in 2008 and 2009 indicated at least three distinct periods of use. The first period was during the Neolithic Michelsberg culture, as evidenced by findings of ceramic fragments and stone artefacts. No extant structures can be attributed to this period, however. The second phase of use was during the late Hallstatt period (700 to 450 BC). The inner wall (a Pfostenschlitzmauer) was built during this time. It likely had a fortified gate to the southeast. This inner wall was destroyed by a fire. The outer wall is the most recent, but it has not been possible so far to date it. It may have seen use well into early medieval times, possibly as a refuge castle for the population of the surrounding villages.

A map from the 19th century shows remains of a square building near the southeast of the structure. However, this area was especially affected by locals using the Altenburg as a source of construction material and today no trace of the building remains. Additional damage to the structures resulted from post-World War II use as a training ground for US Armed Forces stationed nearby. They pitched tents in the area and dug trenches at the Altenburg.

=== Others ===
- Marienaltar at Saint Barbara's Church in Ebersbach
- Historic Saint Jacob's Church in Leidersbach built out of red bunter

== Religion ==
The community of Leidersbach is overwhelmingly Roman Catholic.

== Sports ==
=== Handball ===
The Rhein-Main Bienen (“Rhine-Main Bees”; formerly HSG Sulzbach/Leidersbach) represents the community in the Handball-Bundesliga der Frauen (Women's Federal Handball League). The club won the 2003–2004 championship, which brought with it advancement to the Hesse Upper League (Oberliga). The next season, the team became Hesse champions and won the subsequent elimination series with solid wins. In the Regionalliga Südwest the team took the championship with trainer Peter David in the 2005–2006 season unbeaten, moving up to the Second Bundesliga. HSG finished the season up as Second Bundesliga champions, and a playoff win against TuS Weibern earned the team a spot in the First Bundesliga. Furthermore, the women's team managed to fill the Sparkassen-Arena in Elsenfeld with 3,500 spectators at a cup game against German champions 1. FC Nürnberg. Besides this team, there are two men's teams, a further women's team and several youth teams play.

== Government ==
=== Community council ===
The council is made up of 16 council members with seats apportioned thus:

- CSU - 6 seats
- UBL - 4 seats
- CWG - 3 seats
- SPD - 3 seats

=== Mayor ===
Michael Schüßler (CWG) was elected in a special election in 2017 after the incumbent Friedrich Wöhrl (CSU) died early that year.

=== Coat of arms ===
The community's arms might be described thus: A fess wavy argent, in chief vert three bars of the first surmounting which a pair of tailor's shears expanded in saltire their points in chief of the first, in base gules a wheel spoked of six of the first.

The escutcheon’s upper half with the tailor’s shears and narrow stripes (“bars”) is a reference to the tailor's craft and the clothing factories that were so important to the community's development in the 19th and 20th centuries. The shield's lower half shows the Wheel of Mainz in its historical tinctures, and this stands for the community's history as an Electoral Mainz holding until 1803. The arms have been borne since 1979.

== Infrastructure ==
=== Ermergency services ===
BRK Leidersbach is a local chapter of the Bavarian Red Cross (Bayerisches Rotes Kreuz) in the Miltenberg-Obernburg district association. It was founded on 16 March 1955. The Red Cross association is housed at Kolpingstraße 2 and has maintained the fields of the Youth Red Cross, Preparedness, SEG-Nord (emergency management) and, since 1 March 1984, a certified first responder with his own donation-financed, volunteered ambulance based at the Leidersbach fire station.

== Education ==
As of 2007 the following institutions existed in :

- Kindergartens: in the centres of Leidersbach, Ebersbach and Roßbach
- Primary school-Hauptschule: Volksschule Leidersbach for pupils from all four Ortsteile.

There is also a youth education centre in the former monastery on the Klosterberg in Ebersbach.

== Notable people ==
- Albin Eser, former judge at the International Criminal Tribunal for the former Yugoslavia
