= Dammbach =

- Municipality
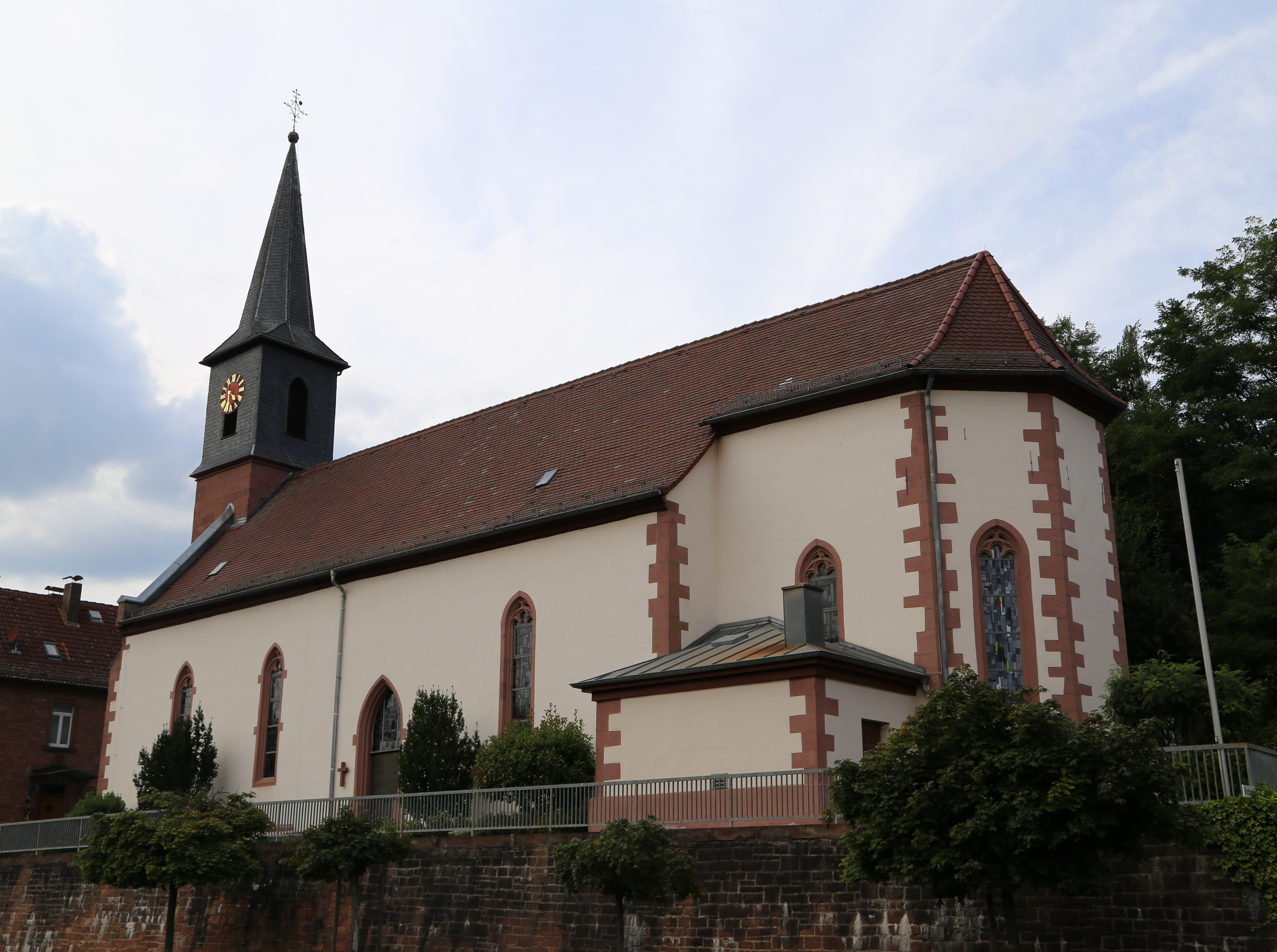
- Church of Saint Valentine in Wintersbach

- Coat of arms

- Location of Dammbach within Aschaffenburg district
- Interactive map of Dammbach
- Location within Germany Location within Bavaria
- Coordinates: 49°51′N 9°18′E
- Country: Germany
- State: Bavaria
- Admin. region: Unterfranken
- District: Aschaffenburg
- Municipal assoc.: Mespelbrunn
- Subdivisions: 2 Ortsteile

Government
  - Mayor (2020–26): Waltraud Amrhein

Area
  - Total: 32.91 km^{2} (12.71 sq mi)
- Elevation: 220 m (720 ft)

Population (2025-12-31)
  - Total: 1,887
  - Density: 57.34/km^{2} (148.5/sq mi)
- Time zone: UTC+01:00 (CET)
  - Summer (DST): UTC+02:00 (CEST)
- Postal codes: 63874
- Dialling codes: 06092
- Vehicle registration: AB
- Website: www.gemeinde-dammbach.de

Dammbach (German pronunciation: [ˈdambax]) is a municipality in the Aschaffenburg district in the Regierungsbezirk of Lower Franconia (Unterfranken) in Bavaria, Germany, and a member of the Verwaltungsgemeinschaft (municipal association) of Mespelbrunn, whose seat is in Heimbuchenthal.

== Geography ==
=== Location ===
The municipality lies in the centre of the Spessart (range), in the so-called High Spessart (Hochspessart). The namesake brook, the Dammbach, rises near Rohrbrunn and has many small tributaries.

As for elevation extremes, the municipality's lowest point lies in the Gemeindeteil of Neuhammer at 200 m (656.2 ft) above sea level, and the highest on the Geishöhe at 525 m (1 722.4 ft).

=== Subdivision ===
The municipality of Dammbach contains several small hamlets such as Schnorrhof, Hundsrück, Heppe and Oberwintersbach.

== History ==
In 1991, the municipality celebrated the festival “750 years of villages in the Dammbach valley”.

=== Amalgamations ===
The municipality came into being in 1976 in the course of municipal restructuring in Bavaria out of the formerly self-administering communities of Wintersbach and Krausenbach. Since both Gemeindeteile were in the Dammbach valley (Dammbachtal in German), Dammbach was chosen as the new name.

== Economy ==
In the last few years, the municipality of Dammbach has opened up a weekend neighbourhood near the Gemeindeteil of Wintersbach in which more than 100 weekend and holiday homes have been built.

Since 1 December 2006, the municipality of Dammbach has been levying a tax on second homes.

== Governance ==
=== Municipal council ===
The council is made up of 14 council members, not counting the mayor.

| | CSU | Unparteiische Wählergruppe | Total |
| 2002 | 9 | 5 | 14 seats |

(as at municipal election held on 3 March 2008)

=== Coat of arms ===
The municipality's arms might be described thus: In chief above a bar wavy argent enhanced, gules an acorn in pale surmounted by two oakleaves in saltire of the first, the base party per pale, dexter barry of eight gules and Or, sinister azure a bend sinister argent surmounted by three rings azure.

Dammbach is a very new municipality, having arisen only in 1976 out of the formerly self-administering communities of Wintersbach and Krausenbach through voluntary merger. Geographically it lies on the Dammbach, whence its name comes. This brook has as a reference to it the wavy bar in the municipality's arms. The oakleaves and acorn in the chief symbolize the municipality's location in the High Spessart. Below the wavy bar on the dexter (armsbearer's right, viewer's left) side, the red and gold bars are taken from the arms formerly borne by the Counts of Rieneck. Krausenbach was for a long time one of their holdings. The bend sinister on the sinister (armsbearer's left, viewer's right) side with the rings is taken from the arms formerly borne by the family Echter von Mespelbrunn. They held the lordship over Wintersbach, building a church there in 1415 and a hospital in 1584.

The arms were conferred on 22 July 1988.

== Infrastructure ==
=== Transport ===
In Dammbach is found the air navigation beacon “PSA” of an international airway.
