= Sulzbach am Main =

- Municipality
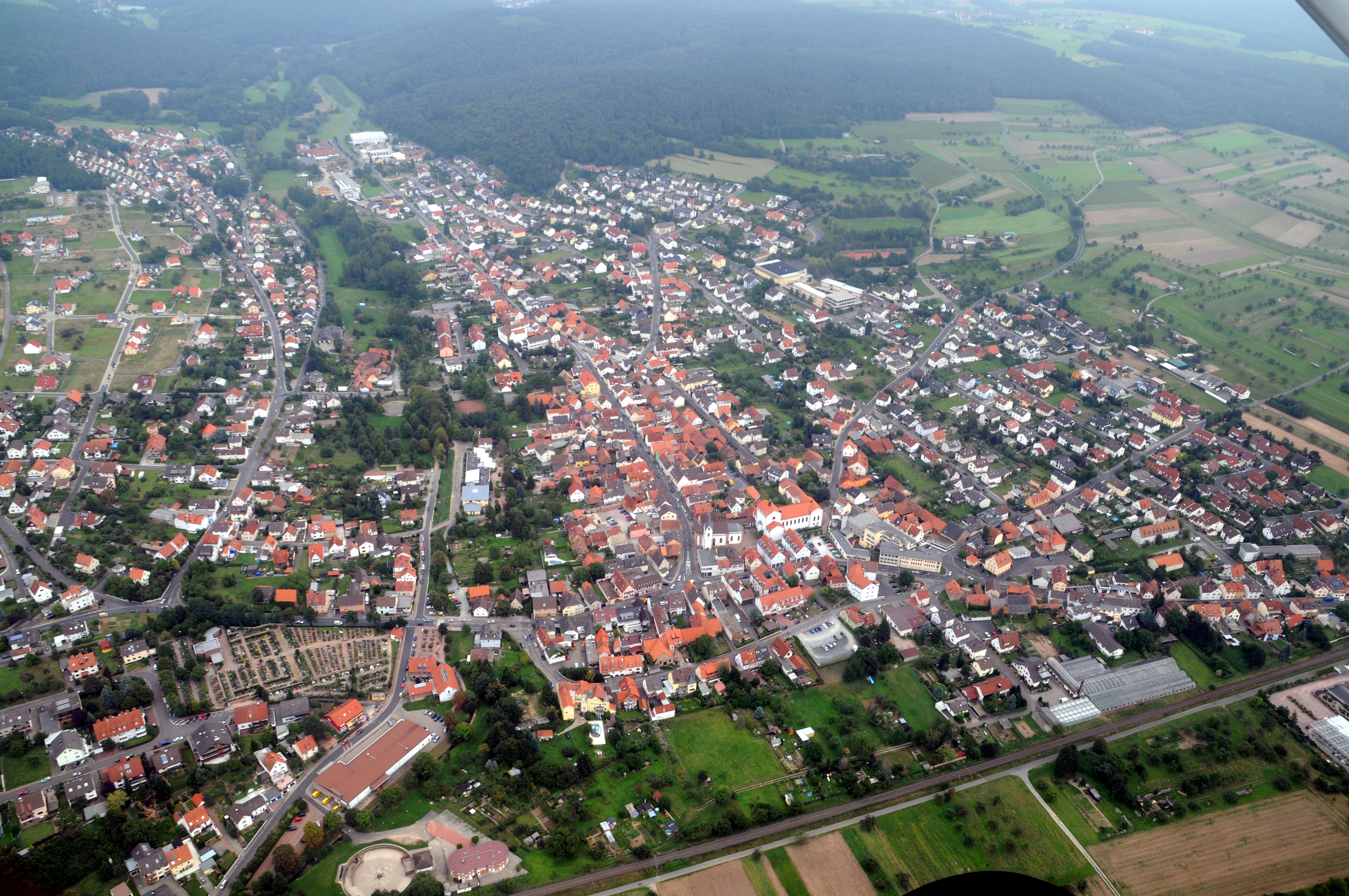
- Aerial picture of Sulzbach

- Coat of arms

- Location of Sulzbach am Main within Miltenberg district
- Interactive map of Sulzbach am Main
- Location within Germany Location within Bavaria
- Coordinates: 49°54′28″N 09°09′24″E
- Country: Germany
- State: Bavaria
- Admin. region: Unterfranken
- District: Miltenberg
- Subdivisions: 3 Ortsteile

Government
  - Mayor (2024–30): Markus Krebs (FW)

Area
  - Total: 19.93 km^{2} (7.70 sq mi)
- Elevation: 123 m (404 ft)

Population (2025-12-31)
  - Total: 7,374
  - Density: 370.0/km^{2} (958.3/sq mi)
- Time zone: UTC+01:00 (CET)
  - Summer (DST): UTC+02:00 (CEST)
- Postal codes: 63834
- Dialling codes: 06028
- Vehicle registration: MIL
- Website: www.sulzbach-main.de

Sulzbach am Main (German pronunciation: [ˈzʊltsbax ʔam ˈmaɪn], lit. 'Sulzbach on the Main'; officially Sulzbach a.Main) is a market municipality in the Miltenberg district in the Regierungsbezirk of Lower Franconia (Unterfranken) in Bavaria, Germany.

== Geography ==
=== Location ===
Sulzbach lies on the rivers Main and Sulzbach, roughly 7 km south of Aschaffenburg on the western edge of the Spessart (range). The hill Pfaffenberg with its radio transmitter is partially located within the municipal territory.

=== Subdivisions ===
Sulzbach's Ortsteile are Sulzbach, Soden (formerly also called Bad Sodenthal) and Dornau.

=== Neighbouring communities ===
Sulzbach is bordered by (from the north, clockwise): Aschaffenburg, Bessenbach, Hohe Wart (gemeindefreies Gebiet), Leidersbach, Kleinwallstadt, Großwallstadt and Niedernberg.

== History ==
Findings from the Neolithic show that the Sulzbach valley was settled as early as 3500 BC. A circular rampart (Altenburg) on the Schlossberg (hill) between Sulzbach-Soden and Ebersbach (part of neighbouring Leidersbach) was in use in the late Hallstatt period (see Attractions).

During Roman times, the Main and the Limes Germanicus formed Germania's border with the then Roman-occupied Odenwald area across the river. In the centuries that followed, several tribes lived in the Sulzbach valley: the Chatti, the Alamanni, the Burgundians and the Franks. It was likely in Charles Martel's time (714–741) that the municipality of Ruchelnheim, which lay within what are now Sulzbach's municipal borders and which was abandoned in the Thirty Years' War, was founded. As far back as Carolingian times, settlements on the streams Sulzbach and Leidersbach, like Sulzbach, Ebersbach, Leidersbach and Roßbach came into being. It is also likely that Soden's founding occurred in late Carolingian times.

Sulzbach and Soden were assigned to the parish of Ruchelnheim, itself subordinate to the Stiftskirche Aschaffenburg (collegiate church) in Aschaffenburg. Sulzbach had its first documentary mention in a document from Pope Lucius III, in which a curtem in Sulzibah (estate in Sulzbach) was listed among the Aschaffenburg Stiftskirche's holdings.

This dates to 1184. From the mid-13th century, Sulzbach belonged to the Centena Ascaffinburg – the tithing area of Aschaffenburg – whose place was taken in the 15th century by the Cent vorm Spessart. Until the 1803 Reichsdeputationshauptschluss, Sulzbach was under Electoral Mainz's lordship. Thereafter, it was part of Prince Primate von Dalberg's newly formed Principality of Aschaffenburg, with which it passed in 1814 (by this time it had become a part of the Grand Duchy of Frankfurt), to the Kingdom of Bavaria. It has remained Bavarian ever since.

As in all other areas in the Spessart, farmland was splintered by Mainz inheritance law in the 18th and 19th centuries pulling Sulzbach, too, into an economic downswing with its attendant consequences for living conditions. Only with the onset of industrialization in Aschaffenburg and the opening of the Aschaffenburg-Miltenberg railway line in 1876 did conditions improve.

The formerly self-administering municipalities of Dornau and Soden were amalgamated with Sulzbach on 1 July 1971 and 1972, respectively. The status of the municipality was changed to Markt ("Market") on 15 May 1973.

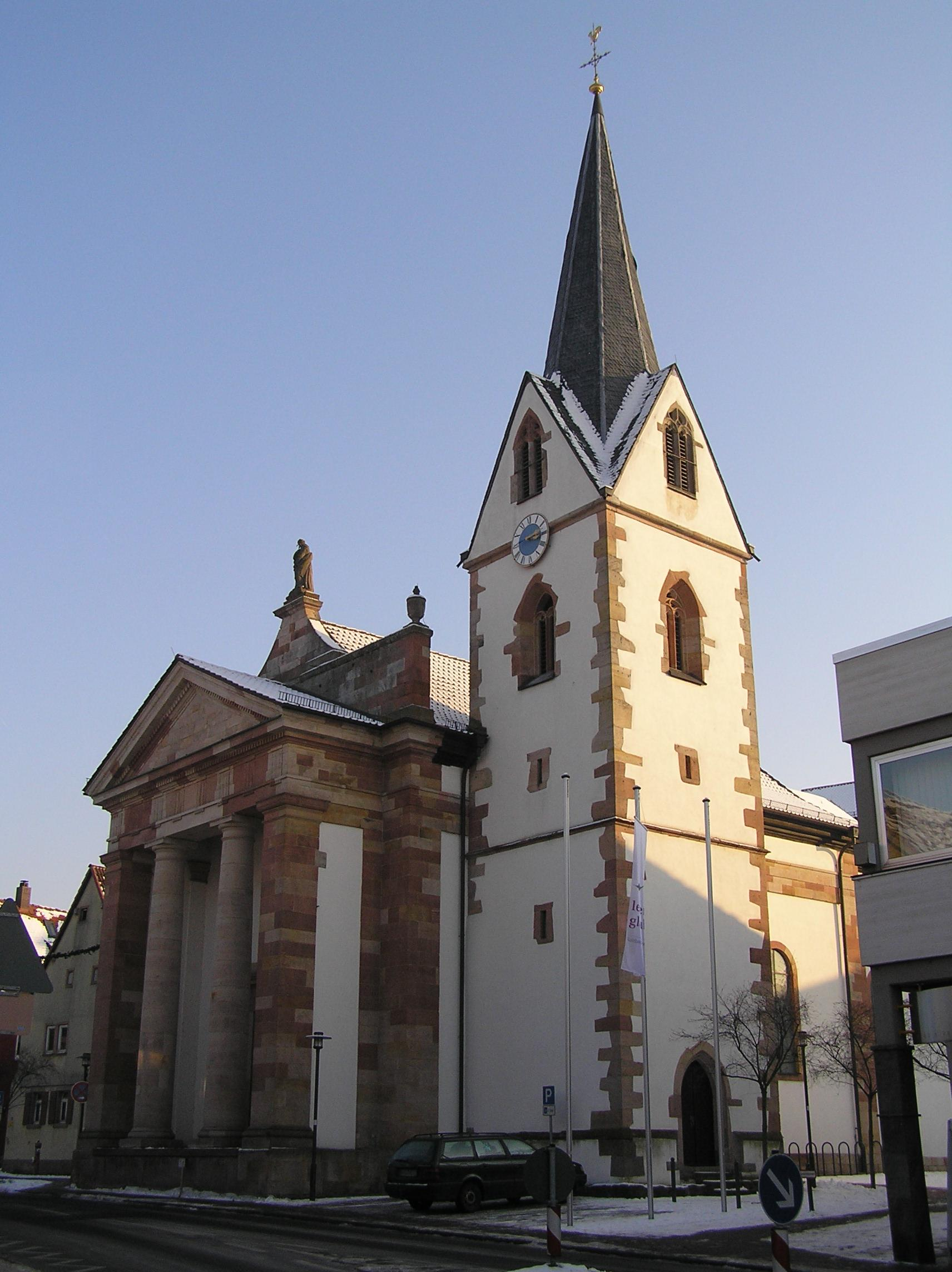
Old parish church

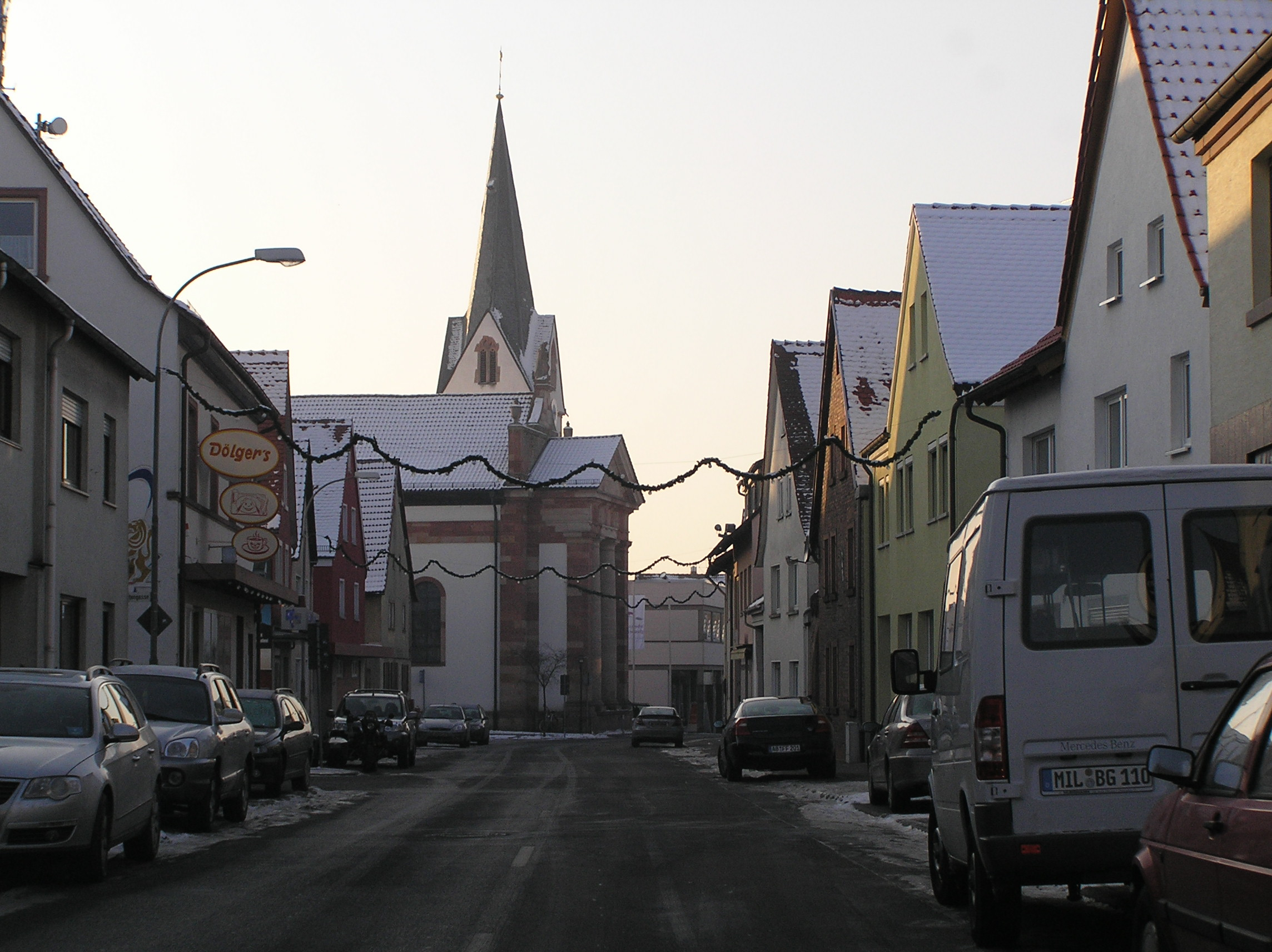
Spessartstraße

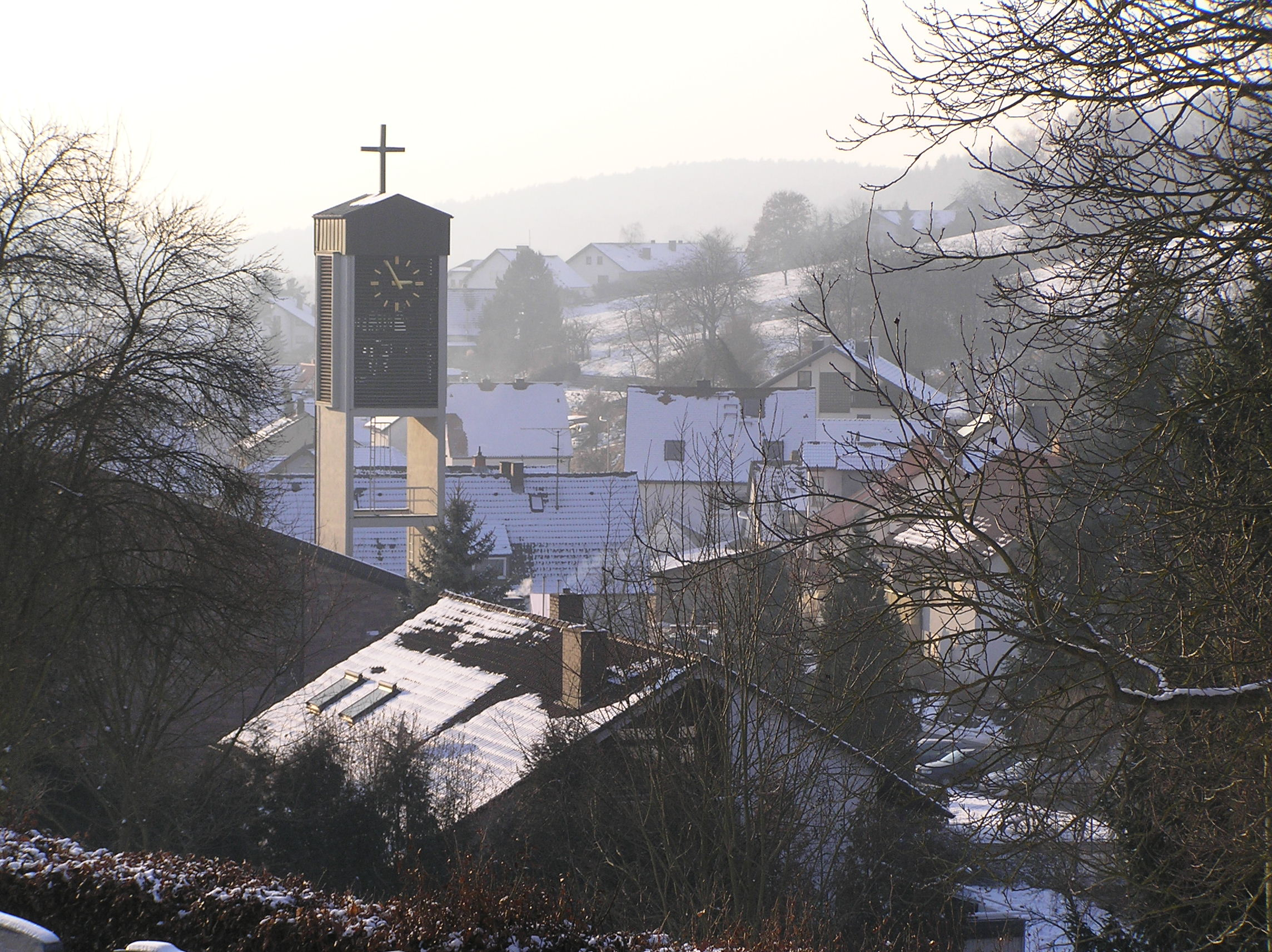
Church in Soden

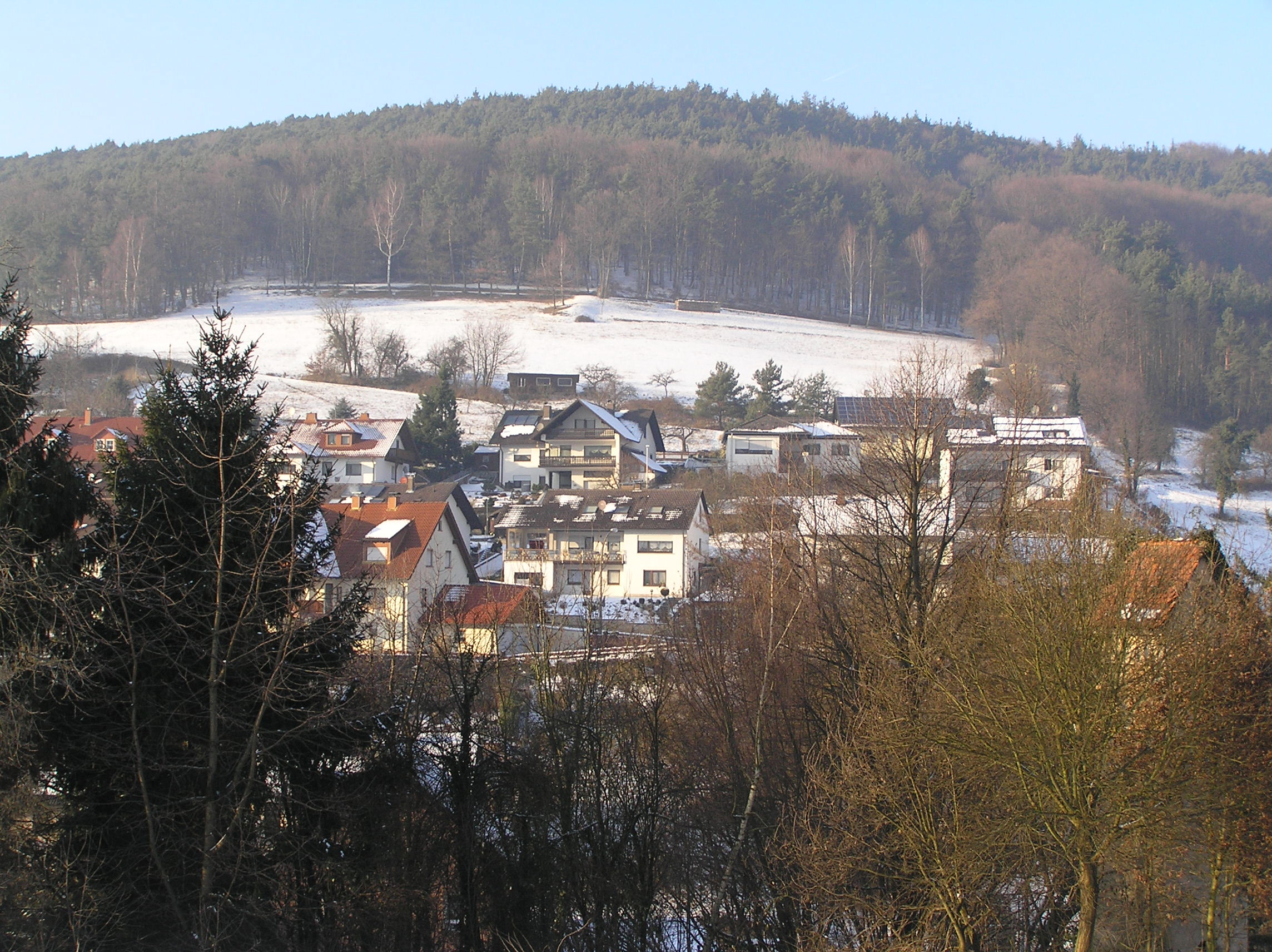
Soden

== Economy ==
Industries associated with Sulzbach are textile and lighter manufacturing.

=== Lighter industry ===
Sulzbach became well known above all for its lighter industry: Ibelo, Europe's biggest lighter producer, had its production facility in Sulzbach and employed more than 300 workers. Today the firm's building is nothing more than a ruin. The firm was refounded after the war by Hermann Zahn, after the original owners, who were Jewish, had emigrated to England, where they founded another lighter firm. The firm was expanded to several times its former size, with the number of employees also steadily rising. Owing to cheaper lighters from Japan, the company became insolvent in 1985 and was sold to another owner, who cut back production bit by bit until in the end, in 2000, he let the remaining workers go because the outside marketing company likewise ended up going bankrupt. Today, remaindered stock is being sold worldwide through a North German company.

=== Textile industry ===
A great number of Sulzbach's inhabitants worked in the local textile industry. Given this industry's general situation, only a few of these companies have survived.

=== Other industries ===
The drink manufacturer Sodenthaler was founded in 1950. Since 1996 the business has belonged to the Coca-Cola Group and is still in operation today in Sulzbach's outlying centre of Soden.

The firm Möbel Kempf made the leap in Sulzbach from a small business to a nationally known furniture shop. Given the bad connection with Hesse, though, the management decided to move the company to Aschaffenburg. Today a subsidiary still sells furniture and other consumer items at a cash-and-carry shop.

== Attractions ==
=== Altenburg ===
The Altenburg (sometimes also Sodenburg) is an oval hilltop fortress on the Schlossberg, right at the municipal border between Sulzbach and Leidersbach. The circular rampart measures about 365 m west to east, with a width of up to 180 m. The remains of the rampart consist of an inner and an outer wall and a moat. Excavations in 2008 and 2009 indicated at least three distinct periods of use. The first period was during the Neolithic Michelsberg culture, as evidenced by findings of ceramic fragments and stone artefacts. No extant structures can be attributed to this period, however. The second phase of use was during the late Hallstatt period (700 to 450 BC). The inner wall (a Pfostenschlitzmauer) was built during this time. It likely had a fortified gate to the southeast. This inner wall was destroyed by a fire. The outer wall is the most recent, but it has not been possible so far to date it. It may have seen use well into early medieval times, possibly as a refuge castle for the population of the surrounding villages.

A map from the 19th century shows remains of a square building near the southeast of the structure. However, this area was especially affected by locals using the Altenburg as a source of construction material and today no trace of the building remains. Additional damage to the structures resulted from post-World War II use as a training ground for US Armed Forces stationed nearby. They pitched tents in the area and dug trenches at the Altenburg.

=== Others ===
Sulzbach retains some parts of its original medieval fortifications, including a gate with two round towers.

== Sport ==
=== Mountainbiking ===
The Mountainbike Club 26 Zoll Sulzbach e.V. was founded in 1993.

=== Handball ===
Representing the market municipality in the women's First Handball Bundesliga are the Rhein-Main Bienen (“Bees”, formerly known as HSG Sulzbach/Leidersbach). The first women's team rose within only four years from the Verbandsliga to the Handball Bundesliga, to which it has belonged since the 2007-2008 season. Also playing in matches as well as the Bundesliga team are two men's teams, a further women's team and several youth teams.

=== Football ===
The two football teams are SV Sulzbach and TSV Soden. The former currently plays in the district class with its first team and the latter plays in the A class.

=== Artistic cycling ===
Another nationally known club is RV Adler Soden, who in their history have already produced German, European and world champions from amongst the men (Korn/Fries; Jurisch/Dreher) and the women (Claudia Dreher).

== Governance ==
=== Mayor ===
On 12 March 2006, Sulzbach elected a new mayor. With 58.8% of the vote, the Freie Wähler candidate Peter Maurer (Soden) was elected. He was reelected in 2012. In March 2018 Martin Stock (CSU) was elected mayor.

=== Municipal council ===
In the election of 2 March 2008 the Freie Wähler – "Free Voters" – saw a three-seat increase in their number of seats on the council. In the latest elections of 16 March 2014 the Freie Wähler lost one seat to the SPD.

The council is made up of 20 council members, not counting the mayor, with seats apportioned thus:

- FWG: 8 seats
- CSU: 8 seats
- SPD: 4 seats

=== Youth council ===
In November 2002, the Sulzbach Youth Council (Jugendrat) was founded to represent local youth's interests. The board's first chairwoman was René Wendland, who held the office until 2004. After a change in bylaws, Michael Lebert and Markus Krebs were elected as her successors. In 2005, Lebert resigned for job-related reasons and Anna-Lena Höcker succeeded him. At the election in October 2006, Stefan Götz and Mareen Wendland were elected the new speakers. The Youth Council has seven members, according to its bylaws.

=== Coat of arms ===
The municipality's arms might be described thus: Gules two salthooks in saltire between a wheel spoked of six in dexter and a fleur-de-lis in sinister argent, in chief an inescutcheon of the second with three chevronels of the field.

The salthooks refer to the saltmining that gave Sulzbach and Soden their names. The Wheel of Mainz stands for the centuries-long Electoral Mainz hegemony in Sulzbach. The heraldic lily goes back to the arms borne by the local Mainz noble family, the Lords of Sulzbach. The inescutcheon is the arms formerly borne by the Lords of Eppstein, who from the 12th to 15th century were the most important landlords in Sulzbach. The tinctures argent and gules (silver and red) are both Electoral Mainz's and Franconia's colours. The arms have been borne since 1955.

=== Town twinning ===
- Urrugne, Pyrénées-Atlantiques, France

== Infrastructure ==
=== Transport ===
Sulzbach is located on Staatsstraße 2309. It has a Haltepunkt on the Main Valley Railway.

== Notable people ==
- Hans Backoffen (c.1470-1519), sculptor, likely born in Sulzbach
- Franz Joseph Dölger, religious scholar and Christian archaeologist
- Hermann Zahn, entrepreneur (IBELO lighters) and recipient of the Bundesverdienstkreuz (awarded 1972)
