= Albin Eser =

German judge (1935–2023)

Albin Eser (26 January 1935 – 20 January 2023) was a German jurist and a former ad litem judge at the International Criminal Tribunal for the former Yugoslavia.

Albin Eser was born in Leidersbach, Lower Franconia, Bavaria. He studied law at the universities of Würzburg, Tübingen and the Free University of Berlin between 1954 and 1958. He served as a judge in German courts from 1971, and was director of the Max Planck Institute for Foreign and International Criminal Law in Freiburg from 1991 to 1994, and Chairman of the Humanities and Social Sciences Section of the Max Planck Society from 1994 to 1997. He was co-initiator of the Committee of Experts preparing the Draft Statute for an International Criminal Court ("Siracusa/Freiburg Draft") in 1995 and 1996, and was a member of the German delegation to the United Nations Diplomatic Conference for negotiations on the structure of the International Criminal Court.

He is Master of Comparative Jurisprudence (M.C.J.) from New York University and Dr. iuris utriusque (Dr.iur.utr.) from the University of Würzburg (doctor of both civil and canon law). He holds honorary doctorates from the Jagiellonian University of Cracow (1991), the Universidad Peruana Los Andes of Huancayo (1996), and Waseda University of Tokyo (2001). He was awarded the university medal from Warsaw University (2000) and is an honorary member of the Hungarian Academy of Sciences in Budapest (1993) and the Japanese Society for Criminal Law (1992).
