= Mespelbrunn (Verwaltungsgemeinschaft) =

- Verwaltungsgemeinschaft
- Location of Mespelbrunn within Aschaffenburg district
- Interactive map of Mespelbrunn
- Location within Germany Location within Bavaria
- Coordinates: 49°55′N 9°18′E
- Country: Germany
- State: Bavaria
- Admin. region: Lower Franconia
- District: Aschaffenburg
- Seat: Heimbuchenthal
- Subdivisions: 3 municipalities

Area
  - Total: 85.07 km^{2} (32.85 sq mi)

Population (2025-12-31)
  - Total: 6,185
  - Density: 72.70/km^{2} (188.3/sq mi)
- Time zone: UTC+01:00 (CET)
  - Summer (DST): UTC+02:00 (CEST)
- Website: www.vgem-mespelbrunn.de

Mespelbrunn is a Verwaltungsgemeinschaft (municipal association) in the district of Aschaffenburg in Bavaria, Germany. Its seat is in Heimbuchenthal.

It consists of the following municipalities:

1. Dammbach
2. Heimbuchenthal
3. Mespelbrunn
