= Kleinwallstadt (Verwaltungsgemeinschaft) =

- Verwaltungsgemeinschaft
- Location of Kleinwallstadt within Miltenberg district
- Interactive map of Kleinwallstadt
- Location within Germany Location within Bavaria
- Coordinates: 49°52′N 9°10′E
- Country: Germany
- State: Bavaria
- Admin. region: Lower Franconia
- District: Miltenberg
- Seat: Kleinwallstadt
- Subdivisions: 2 municipalities

Area
  - Total: 23.84 km^{2} (9.20 sq mi)

Population (2025-12-31)
  - Total: 7,440
  - Density: 312/km^{2} (808/sq mi)
- Time zone: UTC+01:00 (CET)
  - Summer (DST): UTC+02:00 (CEST)
- Website: www.kleinwallstadt-main.de/vg/

Kleinwallstadt is a Verwaltungsgemeinschaft (municipal association) in the district of Miltenberg in Bavaria, Germany. Its seat is in Kleinwallstadt.

It consists of the following municipalities:

1. Hausen
2. Kleinwallstadt
