= Geishöhe =

Hill in Bavaria, Germany

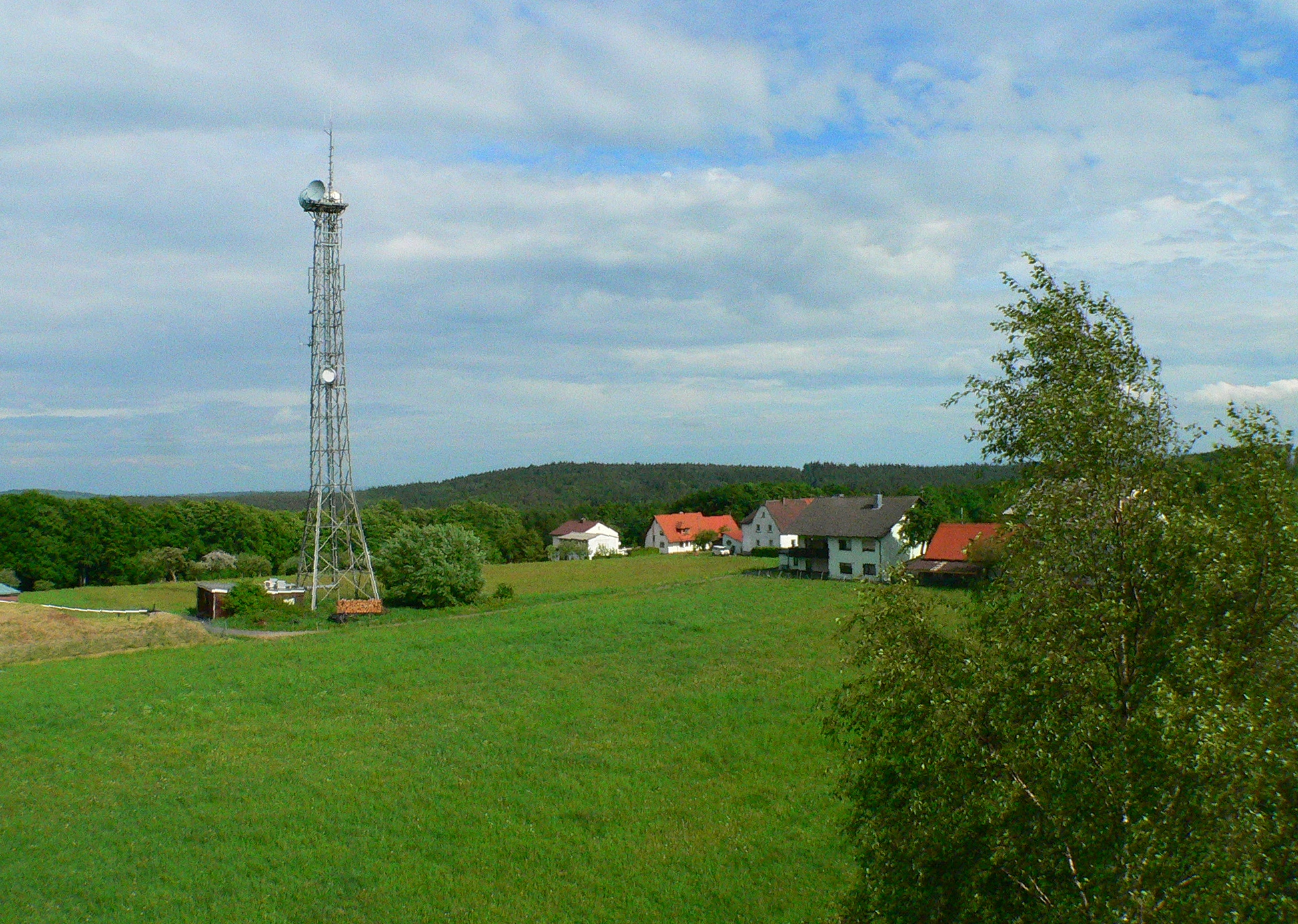
- Transmitter on Geishöhe

Highest point
- Elevation: 521 m (1,709 ft)
- Coordinates: 49°50′36″N 9°19′00″E

Geography
- Location within Bavaria
- Location: Bavaria, Germany
- Parent range: Spessart

Geishöhe (German for goat height) is a 521-meter-tall (1,709 ft) hill of Bavaria, Germany in the Mittelgebirge Spessart.

Oberwinterbach, a hamlet which ist part of the municipality Dammbach, lies on the plateau at the top of the hill. It is the permanently inhabited location with the highest elevation in the Spessart.

At the highest point of Geishöhe stands the Ludwig-Keller-Tower, a lookout tower build by the Spessartbund (the local rambling and naturalist organization) in 1936/37. 60 steps lead to a viewing platform with panoramic view of Spessart, Odenwald, Taunus and Rhön. It is named after the former chairman of the Spessartbund Ludwig Keller (1873 to 1932). Four marked hiking trails meet at the tower.

The lookout tower is used by amateur radio operators due to its exposed location. 100 meters east of the lookout tower rises a 35-meter-high (115 ft) steel lattice mast with the antennas for the Geishöhe transmit and receive system.
