= Sulzbach (Main) =

River in Germany

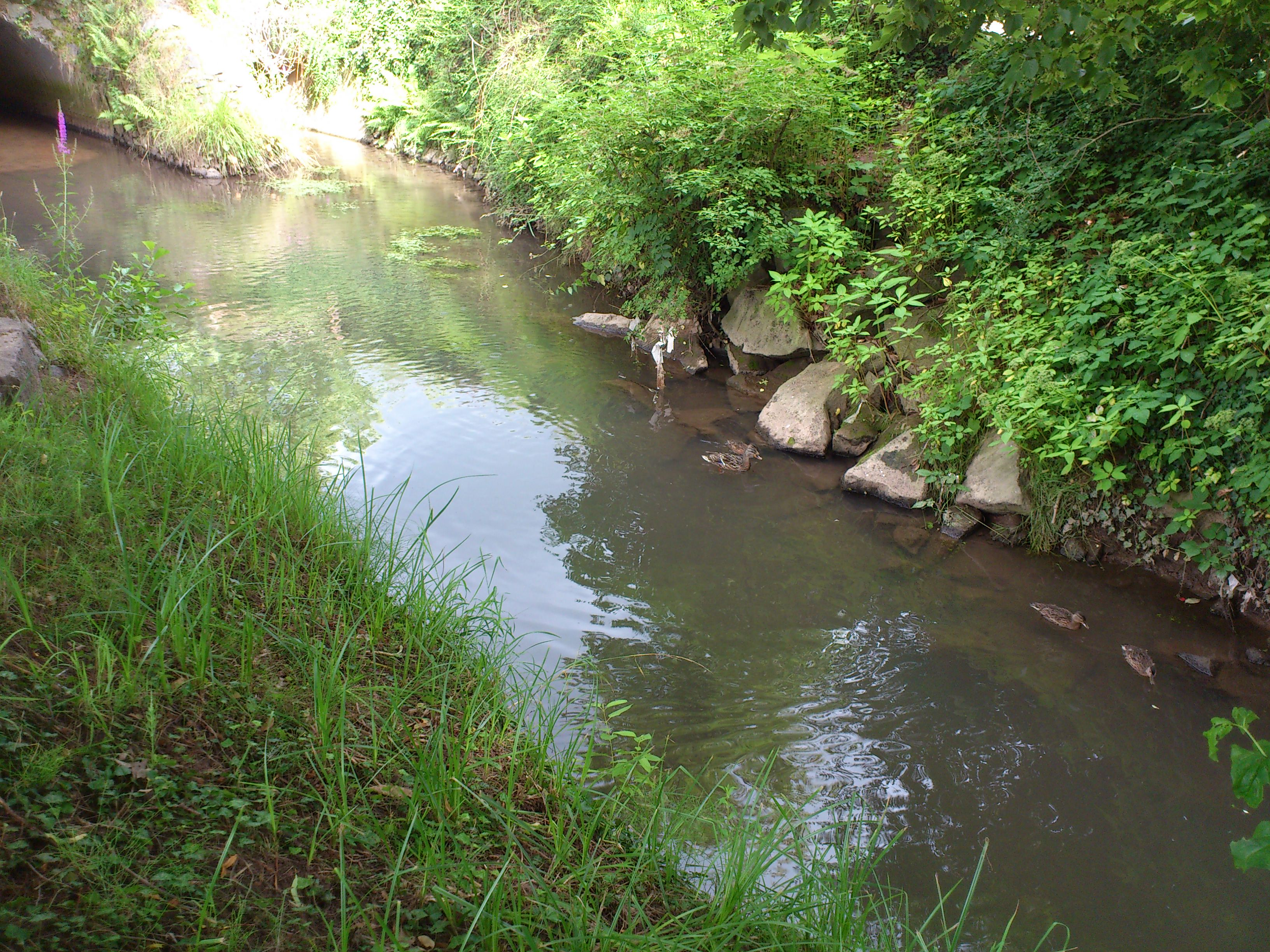
- The Sulzbach at Sulzbach am Main

Location
- Country: Germany
- State: Bavaria

Physical characteristics
- Source
  - elevation: 130 m (430 ft)
- Mouth
  - location: Main
  - coordinates: 49°54′51″N 9°08′41″E
  - elevation: 113 m (371 ft)
- Length: 10.8 km (6.7 mi)
- Basin size: 40.55 km^{2} (15.66 sq mi)

Basin features
- Progression: Main→ Rhine→ North Sea

Sulzbach (German pronunciation: [ˈzʊltsbax]) is a river of Bavaria, Germany. It is a right tributary of the Main in Sulzbach am Main.

== See also ==
- List of rivers of Bavaria
