= Hohe Warte (Spessart) =

- Location within Bavaria

Highest point
- Elevation: 572 m (1,877 ft)
- Coordinates: 49°53′08″N 9°24′22″E

Geography
- Location: Bavaria, Germany
- Parent range: Spessart

Geology
- Mountain type: Mittelgebirge

Hohe Warte (Spessart) is a wooded hill of Bavaria, Germany. It has an elevation of up to 572 meters above NHN and lies in the Spessart range.

Hohe Wart is located in the unincorporated area Rohrbrunner Forst, part of the Aschaffenburg district. To the north Bundesautobahn 3 passes. To the west is the Spessart Hochstrasse.

Note that the similarly named Hohe Wart is a different hill near Leidersbach.
