= Hausen, Miltenberg =

Hausen
- Municipality
- Coat of arms

- Location of Hausen within Miltenberg district
- Interactive map of Hausen
- Location within Germany Location within Bavaria
- Coordinates: 49°52′11″N 9°12′37″E
- Country: Germany
- State: Bavaria
- Admin. region: Unterfranken
- District: Miltenberg
- Municipal assoc.: Kleinwallstadt
- Subdivisions: 2 Ortsteile

Government
  - Mayor (2020–26): Michael Bein

Area
  - Total: 8.05 km^{2} (3.11 sq mi)
- Elevation: 203 m (666 ft)

Population (2025-12-31)
  - Total: 1,836
  - Density: 228/km^{2} (591/sq mi)
- Time zone: UTC+01:00 (CET)
  - Summer (DST): UTC+02:00 (CEST)
- Postal codes: 63840
- Dialling codes: 06022
- Vehicle registration: MIL
- Website: www.hausen-spessart.de

Hausen (German pronunciation: [ˈhaʊzn̩]) is a municipality in the Miltenberg district in the Regierungsbezirk of Lower Franconia (Unterfranken) in Bavaria, Germany and a member of the Verwaltungsgemeinschaft (Administrative Community) of Kleinwallstadt.

== Geography ==
=== Location ===
Hausen lies in the Bavarian Lower Main (Bayerischer Untermain) Region.

The community has only the Gemarkung (traditional rural cadastral area) of Hausen.

== History ==
The settlements of Oberhausen and Unterhausen, once part of the Archbishopric of Mainz, became in accordance with the 1803 Reichsdeputationshauptschluss part of Prince Primate von Dalberg’s newly formed Principality of Aschaffenburg, with which it passed in 1814 (by this time it had become a department of the Grand Duchy of Frankfurt) to Bavaria. On 25 April 1856 the two formerly self-administering communities were merged to form the single community of Hausen.

=== Population development ===
Within town limits, 1,385 inhabitants were counted in 1970, 1,682 in 1987 and in 2000 1,965.

== Politics ==
=== Community council ===
As of the most recent election in 2020, the council is made up of 12 council members, with seats apportioned thus:

- CSU/WG 5 seats
- Hausener Bürgerblock 7 seats

=== Coat of arms ===
The community’s arms might be described thus: Sable a sword per bend sinister the point to chief and flammant argent, the whole surmounted by a cross chequy of two Or and gules, in chief dexter a wheel spoked of six of the second, in base sinister an oakleaf per bend sinister acorned of one of the second.

The chequered cross is drawn from the arms once borne by the Counts of Ingelheim, who succeeded the Echter von Mespelbrunn family as feudal lords when the latter died out in 1665. The Wheel of Mainz refers to the Archbishopric of Mainz, which was also once an overlord. The flaming sword is one of Saint Michael’s attributes, and it is to him that the church in Hausen is consecrated. The oakleaf and the acorn stand for Hausen’s geographical location in the Spessart (range).

The arms have been borne since 1988.

== Economy and infrastructure ==
According to official statistics, there were 42 workers on the social welfare contribution rolls working in producing businesses in 1998. In trade and transport this was 0. In other areas, 746 such workers worked from home. There were 4 processing businesses. Two businesses were in construction, and furthermore, in 1999, there were 12 agricultural operations with a working area of 144 ha, of which 83 ha was cropland and 57 ha was meadowland.

Municipal taxes in 1999 amounted to €674,000 (converted), of which net business taxes amounted to €36,000.

=== Education ===
In 1999 the following institutions existed in Hausen:

- Kindergartens: 100 places with 71 children
