= Hohe Warte (Fichtel Mountains) =

Coordinates: 50°02′52″N 11°39′59″E

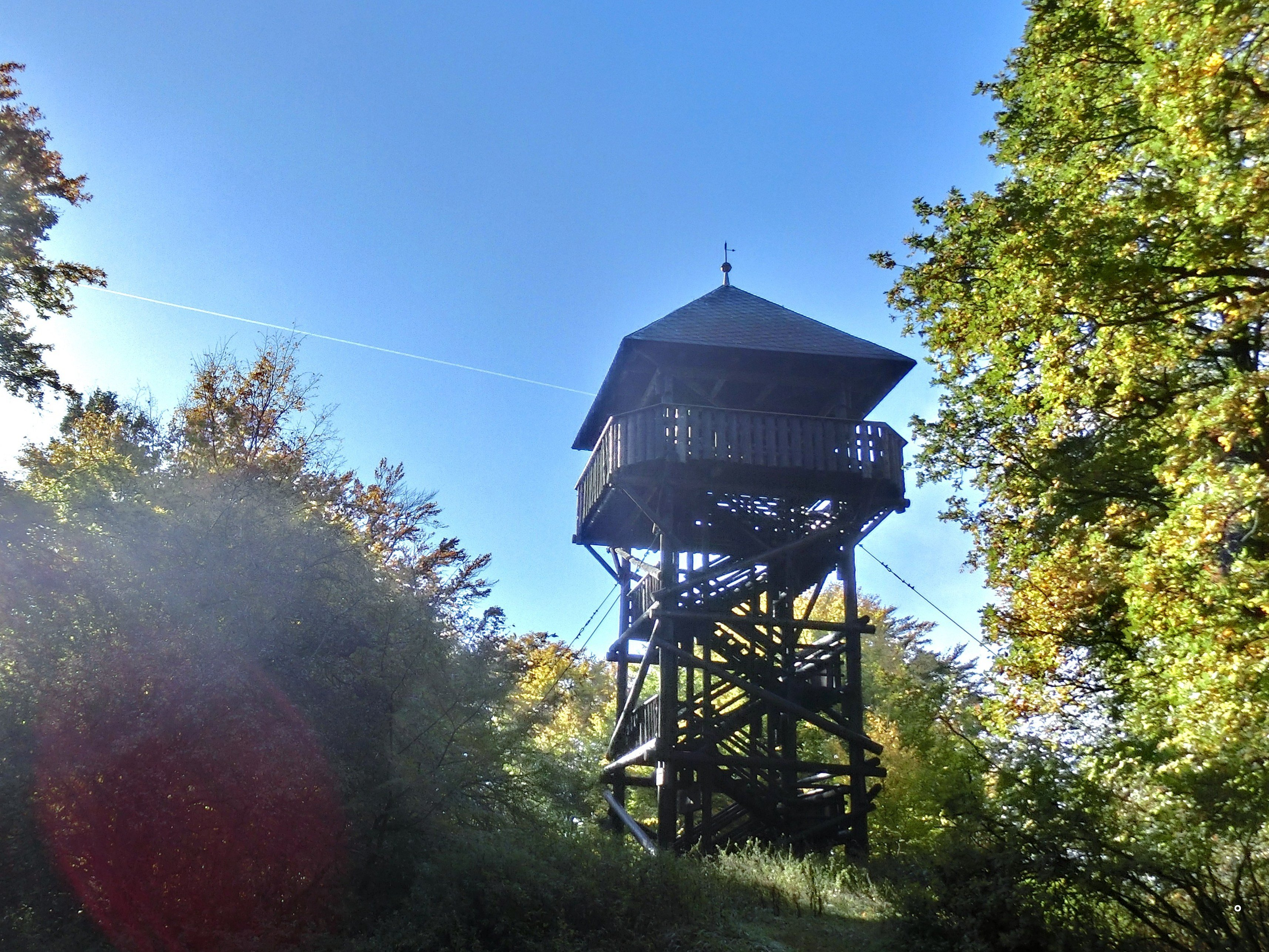
- Lookout tower on the Hohe Warte

Highest point
- Elevation: 547 m (1,795 ft)

Geography
- Location: Bavaria, Germany

The Hohe Warte is a hill in Bavaria, Germany.
