= Hohe Warte (Swabian Jura) =

- Location within Baden-Württemberg

Highest point
- Elevation: 820 m (2,690 ft)
- Coordinates: 48°29′32″N 09°19′53″E

Geography
- Location: Baden-Württemberg, Germany

The Hohe Warte is a mountain in Baden-Württemberg, Germany.
