= Dammbach (Elsava) =

River in Germany

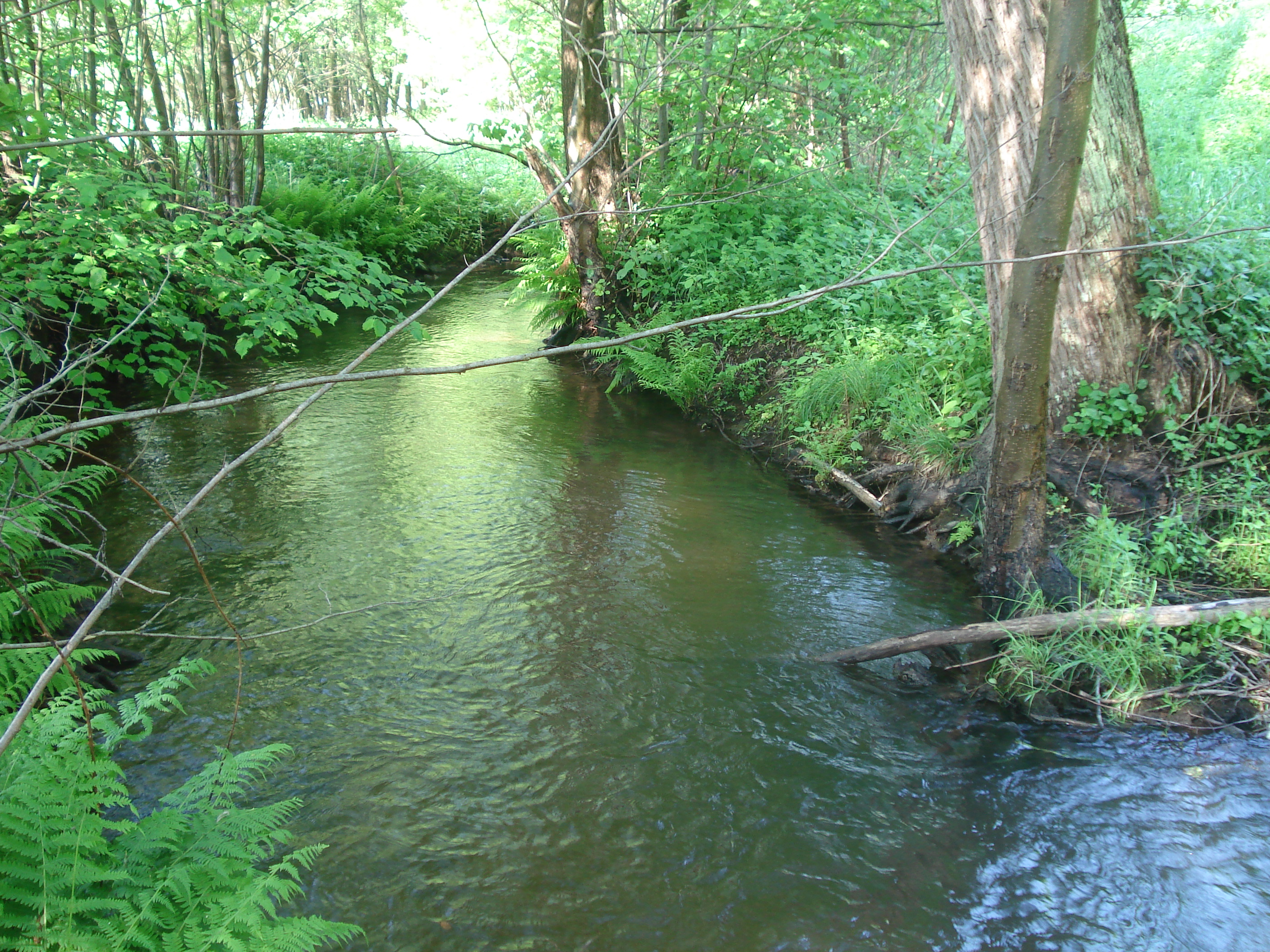
- The Dammbach near Wintersbach (a part of the municipality Dammbach)

Location
- Country: Germany
- State: Bavaria

Physical characteristics
- Source
  - location: Libischbrunnen on the road to Rohrbrunn
  - coordinates: 49°53′20.53″N 9°22′35.49″E
  - elevation: 360 m (1,180 ft)
- Mouth
  - location: at Neuhammer, into the Elsava
  - coordinates: 49.8603°N 9.2875°E
  - elevation: 190 m (620 ft)
- Length: 11.4 km (7.1 mi)
- Basin size: 43 km^{2} (17 sq mi)

Basin features
- Progression: Elsava→ Main→ Rhine→ North Sea
- Tributaries
  - left: Gößbach
  - right: Wintersbach

The Dammbach (German pronunciation: [ˈdambax]) is a river in Bavaria, Germany. It flows into the Elsava near the village Dammbach.

== See also ==
- List of rivers of Bavaria
