= Mespelbrunn Castle =

- Wasserschloss Mespelbrunn
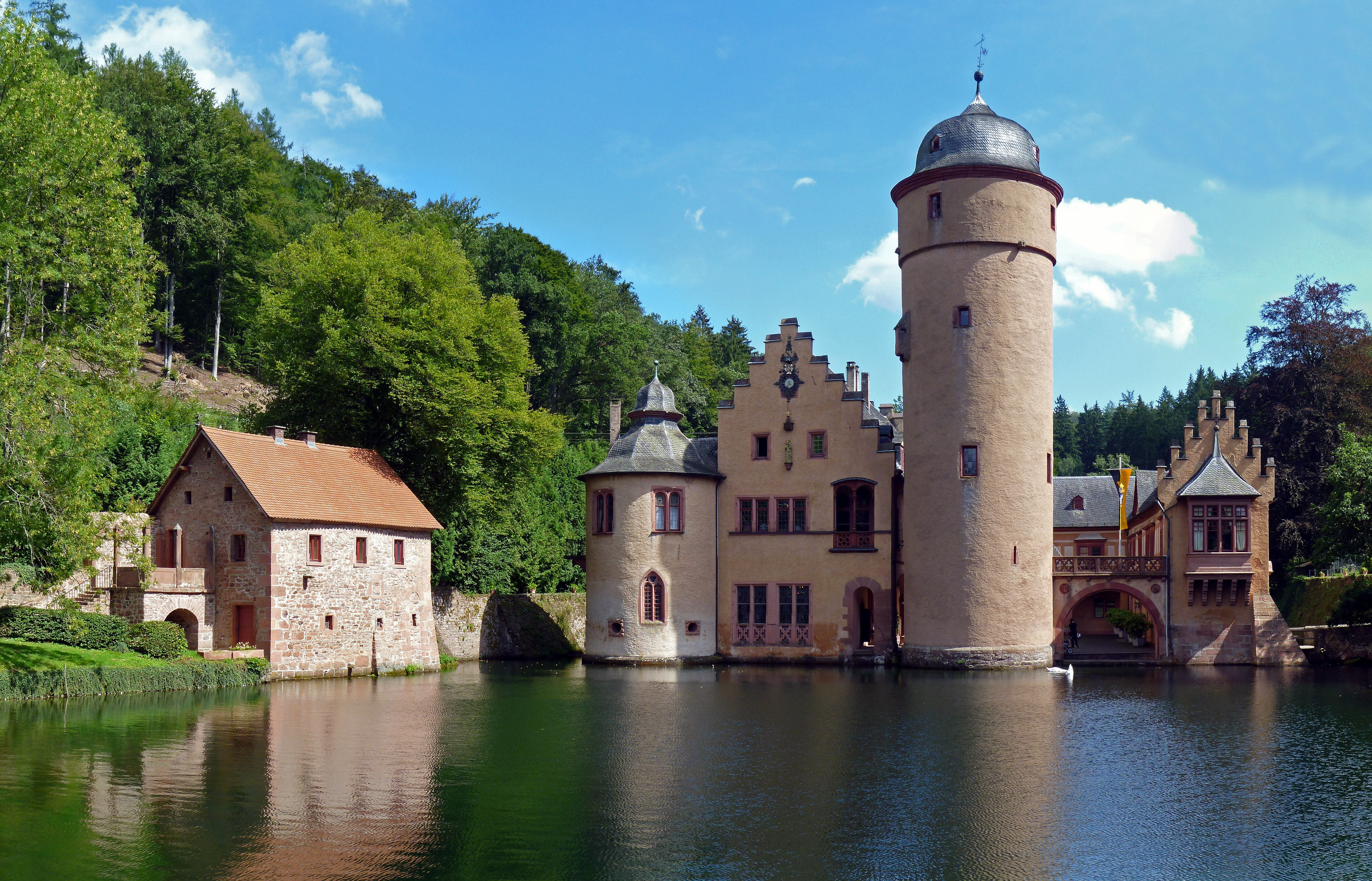
- The west face of Mespelbrunn Castle

- Location within Bavaria Location within Germany

General information
- Type: Palace
- Architectural style: mainly Renaissance
- Location: Mespelbrunn, Germany
- Coordinates: 49°54′20″N 9°18′26″E
- Construction started: 15th century
- Completed: 16th century
- Client: Echter family
- Owner: Ingelheim family

Mespelbrunn Castle is a late-medieval/early-Renaissance moated castle on the territory of the town of Mespelbrunn, between Frankfurt and Würzburg, built in a tributary valley of the Elsava valley, within the Spessart forest. It is a popular tourist attraction and has become a famous Spessart landmark.

== History ==
=== Origins ===
The first precursor of Mespelbrunn Castle was a simple house. The owner was Hamann Echter, vizedom of Aschaffenburg, a title which means that he was the representative of the ruling prince, the Archbishop of Mainz Johann von Nassau-Wiesbaden-Idstein at the castle and town of Aschaffenburg. On 1 May 1412, Johann gave the site, a forest clearing next to a pond, to Echter, a knight, who constructed a house without fortifications. It was a reward for Echter's services against the Czechs. The Echter family originates from the Odenwald region. Their name presumably means "der die Acht vollstreckt", the executor of the ostracism. In the 15th century the Spessart was a wild and unexploited virgin forest, used as a hideout by bandits and Hussites, who despoiled the regions nearby. Therefore, in 1427 Hamann Echter, the son of the first owner, began to rebuild his father's house to a fortified castle with walls, towers, and a moat using the nearby lake.

=== Rebuilding ===
Only the Bergfried, the round tower, remains from the 15th century. The following generations changed the defense structures to a typical manor-house, mainly built in the Renaissance style. Today's fundamental appearance is the result of reconstruction done between 1551 and 1569 by Peter Echter of Mespelbrunn and his wife, Gertrud of Adelsheim.

The most famous member of the family was Julius Echter, Prince-bishop of Würzburg. A prominent proponent of the Counter-Reformation, he founded the Juliusspital, a hospital, in Würzburg, in 1576, and re-founded the University of Würzburg in 1583.

Due to its remote location in a side valley of the Elsava, surrounded by forests, the castle was one of the few in Franconia spared destruction in the Thirty Years' War.

In 1665, the last male member of the Echter family died. In 1648, Maria Ottilia, Echterin of Mespelbrunn, had married Philipp Ludwig of Ingelheim, a member of a family of barons, later made Grafen (Counts) of Ingelheim. By permission of the emperor, the name of the Echter family was preserved, because they were allowed to merge their names to Counts of Ingelheim called Echter von und zu Mespelbrunn.

In 1875, a Romanesque Revival chapel was built as a burial place for the Ingelheim family overlooking the Elsava valley.

== Description ==
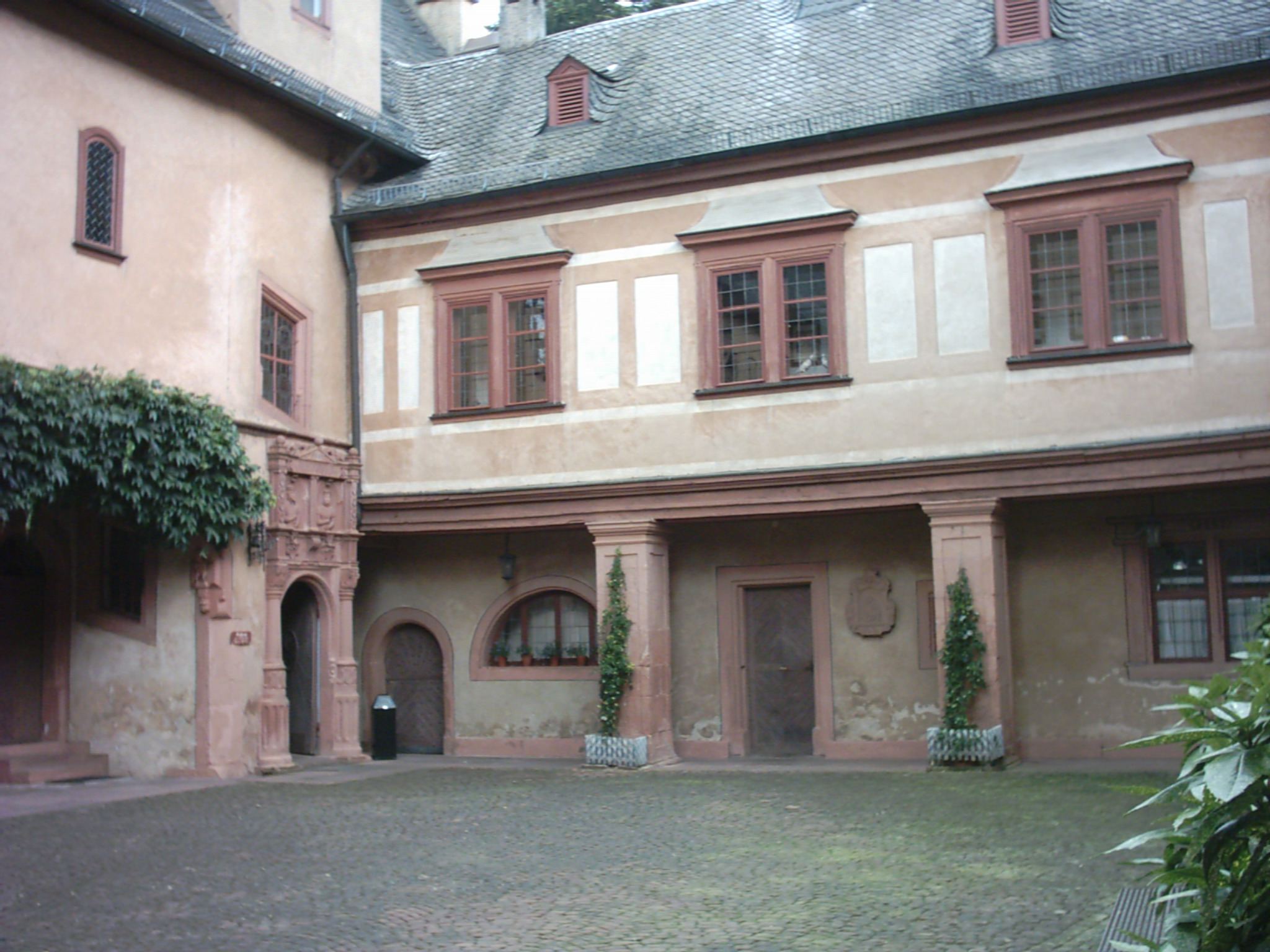
The southern side of the court

The main building of Mespelbrunn Castle is built on an almost square base on the eastern side of a lake. On the whole northern, western and southern side, the court is surrounded by two storied houses. On the northeastern and southwestern corner, towers of similar height are added to the houses. These are decorated with stepped gables on the western side. The main entrance is on the left side of the southern building. On the western side, the court is limited by two framed transits to the water and the main tower in center, which surmounts the castle.

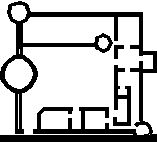
Plan view of the castle

== Today ==
In the 1930s, economic pressures forced the Ingelheim family to open the site to the public. Today, Mespelbrunn Castle is still owned by the family of the Counts of Ingelheim, who live in the southern wing of the castle, having moved out of the main rooms.

== In popular culture ==
In 1957, Mespelbrunn Castle was one of the locations of the German film Das Wirtshaus im Spessart (The Spessart Inn, 1958), based on the novella by Wilhelm Hauff.
