= Mespelbrunn =

- Municipality
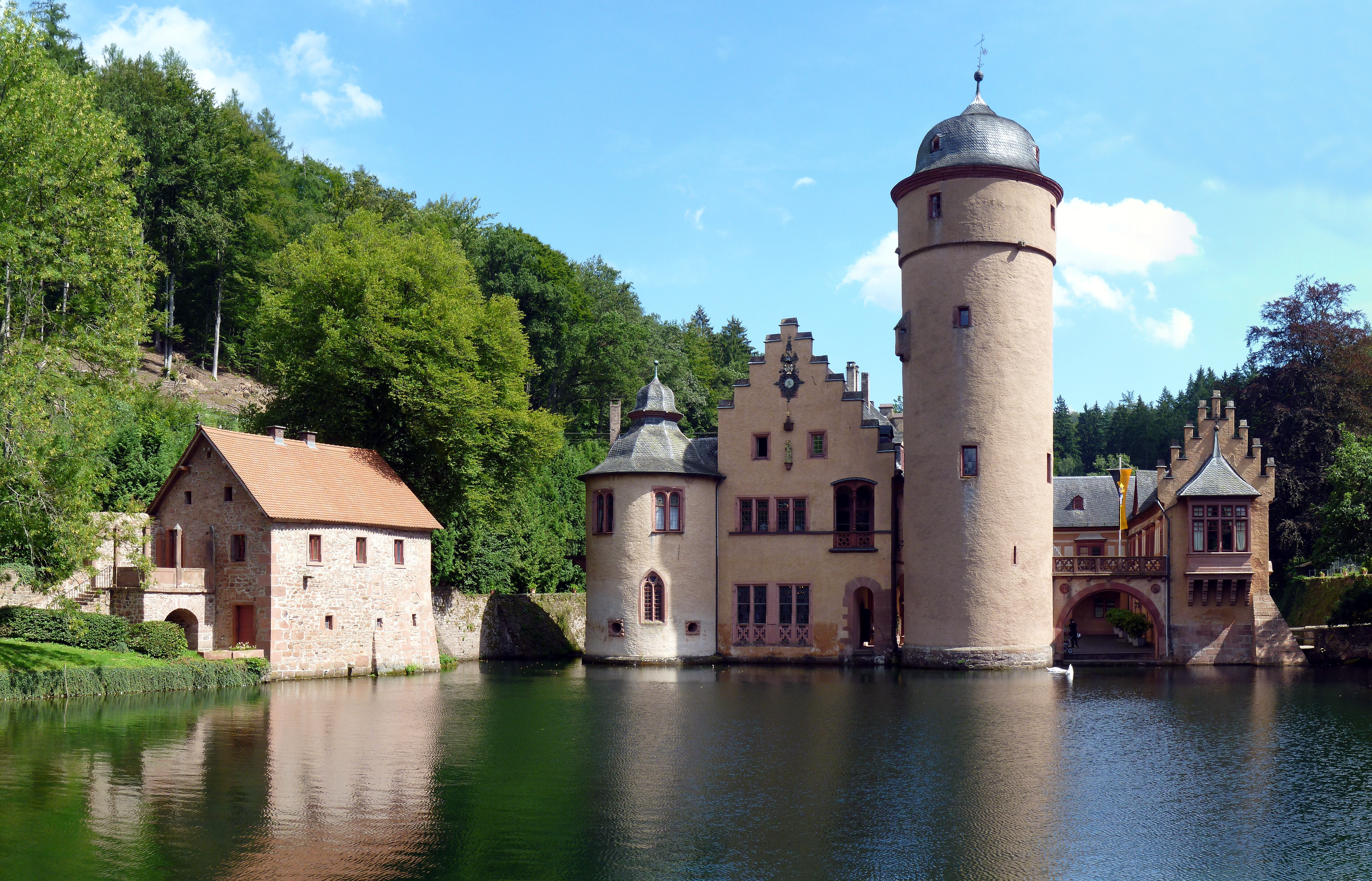
- Mespelbrunn Castle

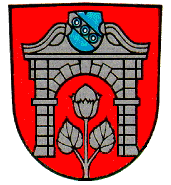
- Coat of arms

- Location of Mespelbrunn within Aschaffenburg district
- Interactive map of Mespelbrunn
- Location within Germany Location within Bavaria
- Coordinates: 49°55′N 9°17′E
- Country: Germany
- State: Bavaria
- Admin. region: Unterfranken
- District: Aschaffenburg
- Municipal assoc.: Mespelbrunn

Government
  - Mayor (2023–29): Stephanie Fuchs (CSU)

Area
  - Total: 15.53 km^{2} (6.00 sq mi)
- Elevation: 269 m (883 ft)

Population (2025-12-31)
  - Total: 2,170
  - Density: 140/km^{2} (362/sq mi)
- Time zone: UTC+01:00 (CET)
  - Summer (DST): UTC+02:00 (CEST)
- Postal codes: 63875
- Dialling codes: 06092
- Vehicle registration: AB, ALZ
- Website: www.mespelbrunn.de

Hessenthal

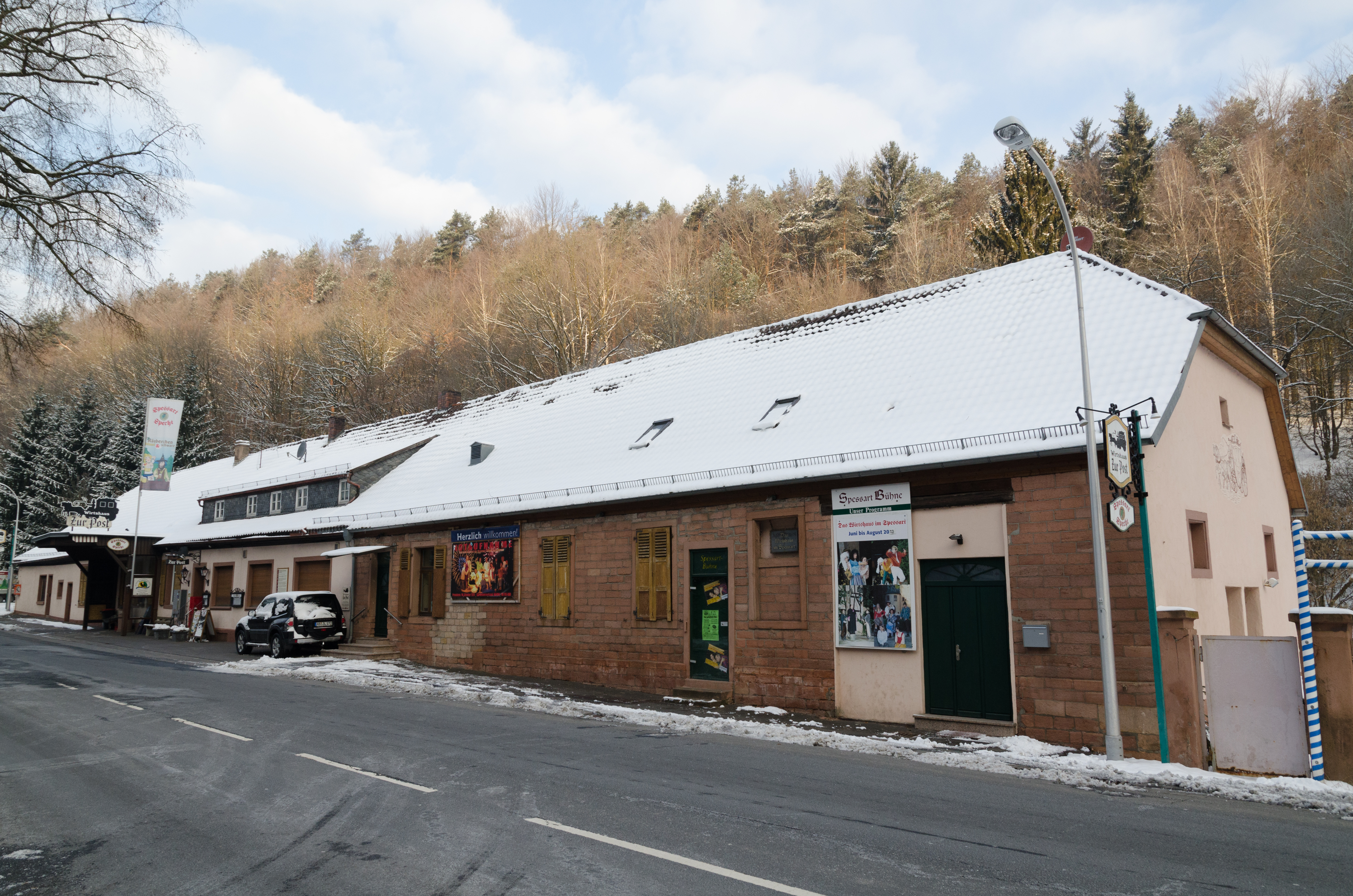
Gasthof zur Post

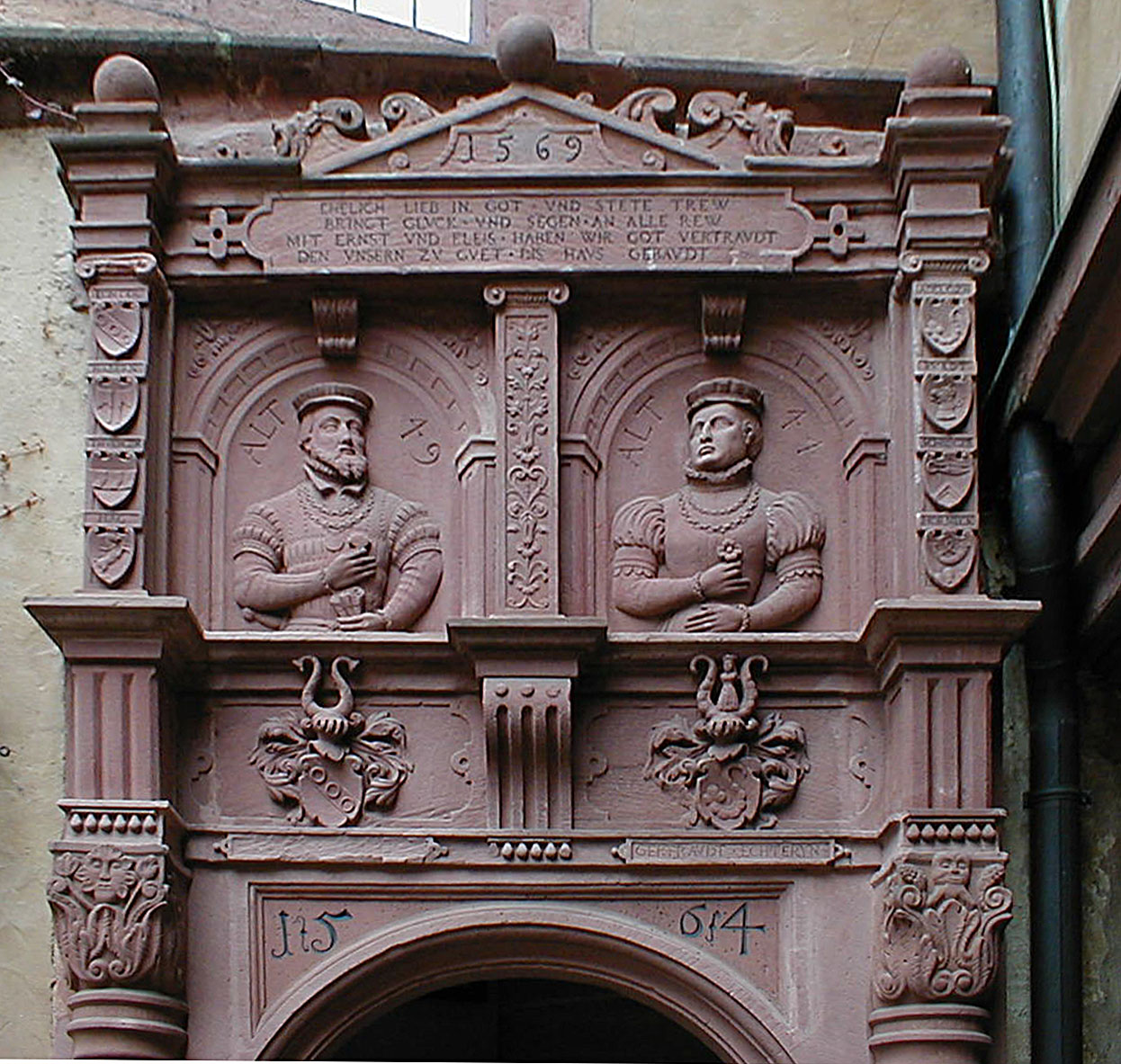
Portal in Mespelbrunn Castle’s inner courtyard

Mespelbrunn is a municipality in the Aschaffenburg district in the Regierungsbezirk of Lower Franconia (Unterfranken) in Bavaria, Germany and a member of the Verwaltungsgemeinschaft (municipal association) of Mespelbrunn, whose seat is in Heimbuchenthal.

It is the site of Mespelbrunn Castle, one of the most famous landmarks of the Spessart region, and of the Wallfahrtskirche Hessenthal, for more than 700 years the destination of a Christian pilgrimage.

== Geography ==
=== Location ===
Gemeindeteile

The municipality lies in the Spessart hill range, a Mittelgebirge. Most of the houses are located in the valley of the Elsava, but the municipal territory extends into the wooded hills, especially to the east.

=== Subdivision ===
The municipality was formed out of the former municipalities of Hessenthal and Mespelbrunn. Today, it has three Ortsteile (Hessenthal, Mespelbrunn and Schloss Mespelbrunn) on two Gemarkungen (cadastral areas), Hessenthal and Mespelbrunn.

=== Neighbouring municipalities ===
The neighbouring municipalities are (from the north, clockwise): Bessenbach, the unincorporated areas Waldaschaffer Forst and Rohrbrunner Forst, Heimbuchenthal, Leidersbach and the unincorpoared area Forst Hohe Wart. The latter two are located in the neighbouring district of Miltenberg.

== History ==
The foundation of the villages Hessenthal and Neudorf (after 1939: Mespelbrunn) was the result of settlement activities in the Spessart by the Archbishops of Mainz and the Counts of Rieneck, respectively. Between the two villages ran the territorial border between these lords.

The pilgrimage to Hessenthal (see church below) goes back at least to 1293. It was established by Mainz as a response to the Rienecks' foundation of Kloster Himmelthal. In the Middle Ages, the Elsava valley and Hessenthal were located on the juncture of two important long distance trade routes, the Via Publica through the Spessart to the Main crossing at Lengfurt (today a part of Triefenstein) and the early-medieval Salzweg from Worms.

The west-east route from Aschaffenburg to Würzburg gained in importance in the 18th century, resulting in the establishment by Mainz of a fortified road through the Spessart and an overland mail station at Hessenthal around 1800. It prospered until a new route from Lohr to Aschaffenburg via Hain (now part of Laufach) was established. In 1854, the Ludwig Western Railway was built, shifting transit traffic to the railway.

The inn that served as mail station (Zur Post) was visited in 1826 by Wilhelm Hauff and is one of several possible inspirations for the inn in his novella Das Wirtshaus im Spessart, later to become a successful film (The Spessart Inn).

== Government ==
=== Municipal council ===
The council is made up of 14 council members, not counting the mayor.

	CSU	SPD	Freie Bürger 84	Total
2002	8	2	4	14 seats

(as at municipal election held on 3 March 2008)

=== Coat of arms ===
The municipality’s arms might be described thus: Gules the castle portal of Mespelbrunn argent surmounted above the lintel by an inescutcheon azure a bend of the second surmounted by three annulets of the third, from base issuant into the gateway arch a hazel twig growing palewise with two leaves and one nut of the second.

The arms were conferred in 1986 and show the castle entrance of the family Echter with their family coat of arms in the inescutcheon. The hazel twig stands for Hessenthal, whose name was once Haseltal ("Hazeldale"). The tinctures gules and argent (red and silver) are taken from the arms borne by the Electorate of Mainz.

== Attractions ==
=== Schloss Mespelbrunn ===
Mespelbrunn earns its livelihood above all from tourism, and is known for Mespelbrunn Castle (Wasserschloss Mespelbrunn), expanded beginning in 1551 by the Echter family. In Mespelbrunn and at the moated castle, several scenes of the 1950s German classic film The Spessart Inn were shot.

=== Wallfahrtskirche Hessenthal ===
Wallfahrtskirche Hessenthal

A further point of interest is the three-naved Wallfahrtskirche Hessenthal, a pilgrimage church, in the Ortsteil of Hessenthal featuring:

- a Gothic pilgrimage chapel (the Echter family's burial place with a Renaissance tomb for Julius Echter von Mespelbrunn’s parents and siblings)
- a Divine Grace Chapel with a late Gothic Pietà as an image of divine grace
- a Crucifixion Group by Hans Backoffen and a Lamentation of Christ attributed to Tilman Riemenschneider in a wing by Hans Schädel from the 1950s.

=== Herrnbildkapelle ===
Herrnbildkapelle

The chapel, which was where the pietà was originally kept, is located around 1 kilometer northwest of the Wallfahrtskirche close to an intersection of two ancient roads: the Salzweg from Worms and the Via Publica from Brussels to Prague (the local stretch connected Aschaffenburg to Würzburg). The current structure dates from 1670 and has been largely unchanged since then.

== Notable people ==
- Julius Echter von Mespelbrunn (1545–1617), Prince-Bishop of Würzburg and Duke of Franconia.
- Jakob Brand (1776–1833), first Bishop of Limburg
