= Hohe Warte (Rothaar) =

Mountain in Hesse, Germany

Coordinates: 51°03′16″N 8°31′49″E

Highest point
- Elevation: 644.8 m (2,115 ft)

Geography
- Location: Landkreis Waldeck-Frankenberg, Hesse, Germany

Hohe Warte is a mountain of Landkreis Waldeck-Frankenberg, Hesse, Germany.

== Geography[edit] Edit source] ==
=== Location ===
The Hohe Warte rises as part of the eastern slope of the Rothaargebirge in the Elbrighäuser Forest, which belongs to the Ederbergland hinterland. It belongs largely to the urban area of Battenberg in Hesse, whose core city lies about 9 km to the southeast; the Battenberg district of Dodenau is located 5.5 km to the southeast. The western flank extends in Hesse and also in the Wittgensteiner Land, which belongs to Westphalia, with Alertshausen. In Hesse, the Elbrighäuser Bach rises in the eastern transition area to the Heidenköpfe (approx. 610 m) and the Riedgraben at the neighbouring Hintersten Kopf (604.5 m) to the southwest, and in North Rhine-Westphalia the mountain is passed in the west by the Elsoff, which flows through Alertshausen; they are all Eder tributaries.

=== Natural spatial assignment ===
The Hohe Warte lies in the main natural unit group Süderbergland (No. 33) on the border of the main unit Ostsauerländer Gebirgsrand (332) with the subunit Hinterländer Ederbergland (332.1) and the natural area Elbrighäuser Wald (332.11) approximately in the southeast to the main unit Rothaargebirge (with Hochsauerland) (333) with the subunit Winterberger Hochland (333.5) and the Wilde Struth natural area (333.50) in the northwest.

=== Mountain height ===
The Hohe Warte is 644.8 m high. However, its height is sometimes only given as about 642 m, which refers to a place just under 100 m south-southeast of its summit at an altitude of 641.5 m.

== Protected areas ==
To the northeast, the landscape of the Hohe Warte descends into the Elbrighäuser Bach nature reserve (CDDA no. 162917; designated in 1995; 1.44 km² in size) and to the south into the Riedgraben nature reserve (CDDA no. 165175; 1995; 76 ha); both are part of the Upper Eder Fauna-Flora-Habitat Area (FFH no. 4917-350; 23.35 km²). The Hessian parts of the mountain, and thus by far its largest part, are located in the Hessian Rothaargebirge bird sanctuary (VSG no. 4917-401; 272.73 km²).

== History ==
=== Fortifications ===
After the independence of the Wittgenstein counts in 1238, a castle-like fortificationwas built on the Hohe Warte around 1250. This was a clear boundary marker between Battenberg and Wittgenstein.

=== Origin of the name ===
As early as the early Middle Ages, watchtowers were created as observation points. The word wart is derived from the Old High German warta, which means to warn.

== Traffic and hiking ==
To the west, past the Hohe Warte, the Landesstraße 877 (Diedenshausen–Alertshausen–Elsoff) runs in a north-northeast-south-southwest direction on the Westphalian side. The wooded mountain can be reached, for example starting from this road, on forest and farm roads, which lead, among other things, past the Karlsburg and Burghelle outreaches, which are located on a plateau above the village of Alertshausen. About 450 m southeast of the summit is the Fallgrube farm.
