= Kleinwallstadt =

- Municipality
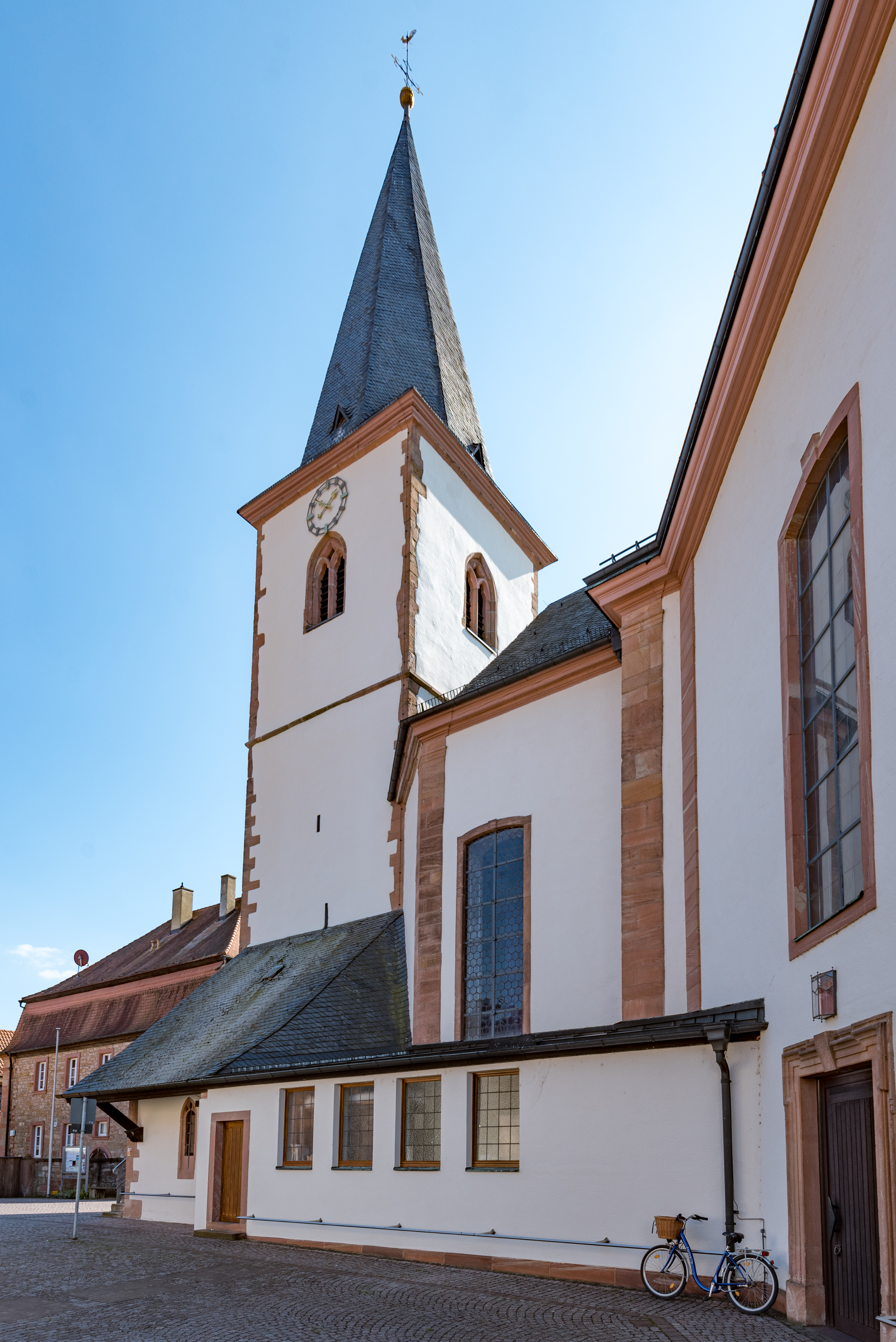
- Church of Saints Peter and Paul

- Coat of arms

- Location of Kleinwallstadt within Miltenberg district
- Interactive map of Kleinwallstadt
- Location within Germany Location within Bavaria
- Coordinates: 49°52′18″N 09°10′04″E
- Country: Germany
- State: Bavaria
- Admin. region: Unterfranken
- District: Miltenberg
- Municipal assoc.: Kleinwallstadt
- Subdivisions: 2 Ortsteile

Government
  - Mayor (2020–26): Thomas Köhler (CSU)

Area
  - Total: 15.77 km^{2} (6.09 sq mi)
- Elevation: 123 m (404 ft)

Population (2025-12-31)
  - Total: 5,604
  - Density: 355.4/km^{2} (920.4/sq mi)
- Time zone: UTC+01:00 (CET)
  - Summer (DST): UTC+02:00 (CEST)
- Postal codes: 63839, 63835
- Dialling codes: 06022
- Vehicle registration: MIL
- Website: www.kleinwallstadt.de

Kleinwallstadt is a market municipality in the Miltenberg district in the Regierungsbezirk of Lower Franconia (Unterfranken) in Bavaria, Germany and the seat of the like-named Verwaltungsgemeinschaft (Administrative Community).

== Geography ==
=== Location ===
Kleinwallstadt lies in the Bavarian Lower Main (Bayerischer Untermain) Region.

The community has the following Gemarkungen (traditional rural cadastral areas): Hofstetten, Kleinwallstadt.

== History ==
Kleinwallstadt was already settled quite early on. Archaeological finds from Hallstatt times bear witness to the prehistoric settlers. At a find in 1980, not only were some female skeletal remains unearthed, but also some lovely grave goods from Alamannic times (4th-5th century).

In Kleinwallstadt, then also known as Bischofswallstadt, which was converted to Christianity as early as the early 8th century, the Archbishop of Mainz established in 1023 a Vogtei and a tithe court over a great expanse of the Spessart (range). In the 12th and early 13th century, the Lords of Waldenberg were enfeoffed with the place. About 1185 they built a castle on a crag east of the community, but this had already been destroyed by the mid 13th century. (The remains of the Altes Schloss were explored by archaeologists in 2006 and 2007). From the 16th century, the Focke von Wallstadt family were resident in the community. Their seat, the “Ingelheimer Hof” next to the town hall, and all appurtenances passed in 1587 to the Echter von Mespelbrunn family, and thereafter to the Imperial Counts (Reichsgrafen) of Ingelheim.

Under Archbishop Johann Schweikhard von Kronberg in 1611, 84 witches were put to death in Kleinwallstadt. Since the Thirty Years' War had wrought such devastation upon Kleinwallstadt and all records and documents had been destroyed, the Archbishop of Mainz issued new guild charters in 1733 for Kleinwallstadt and the surrounding villages. It can be inferred from these that earlier on in Kleinwallstadt and the surrounding area, quite a lively commercial life had taken hold, for the charters number 17 occupations, such as cooper, brewer, carpenter, mason, potter, dyer, glazier, stocking weaver and linen weaver. On the same grounds, the market rights, which had surely been granted earlier, were newly confirmed and chartered in 1737 by the Elector of Mainz.

The Electoral Mainz Vogteiamt of Kleinwallstadt passed with the 1803 Reichsdeputationshauptschluss to the newly formed Principality of Aschaffenburg, with which it passed in 1814 (by this time it had become a department of the Grand Duchy of Frankfurt) to Bavaria.

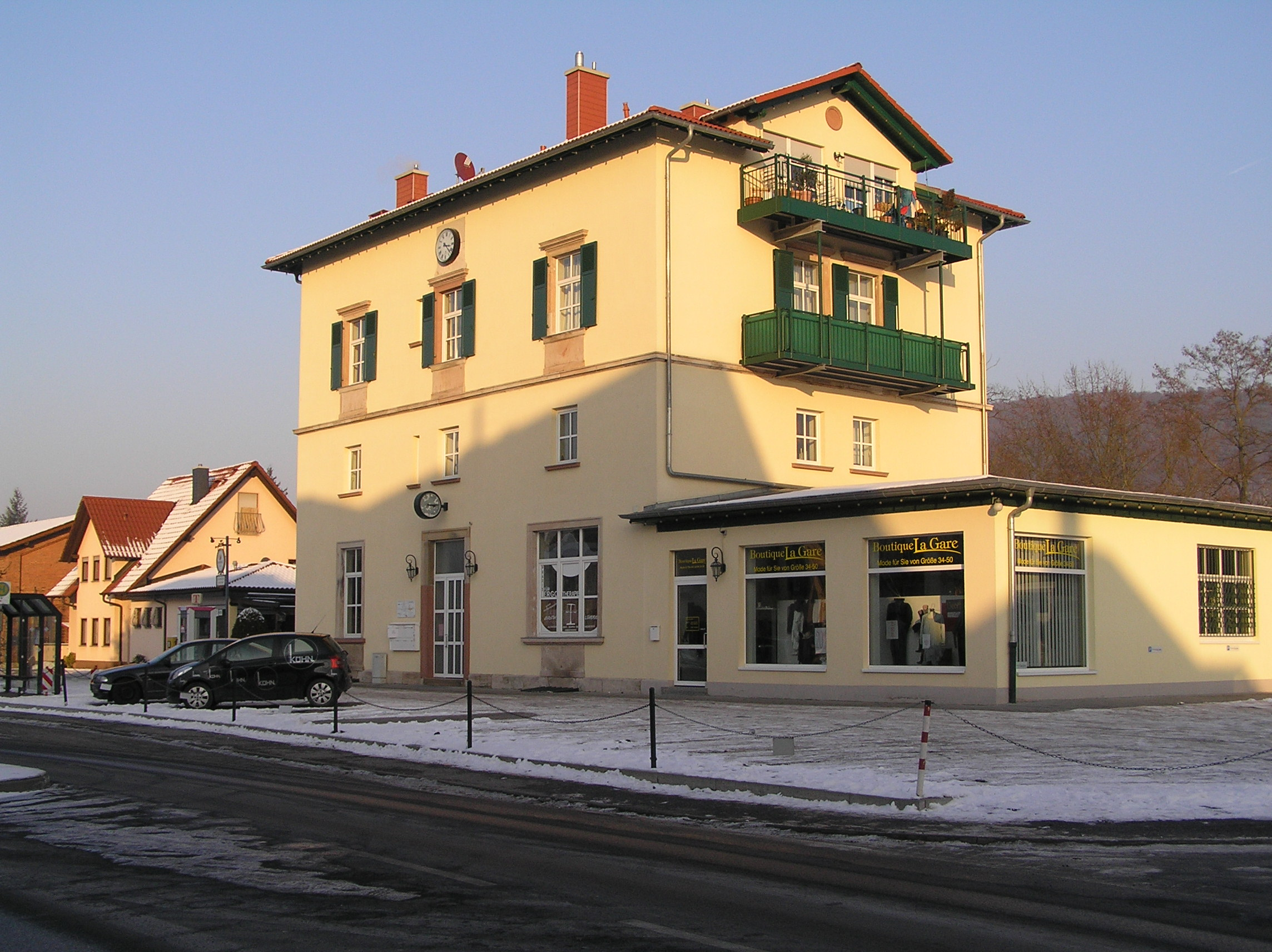
Railway station

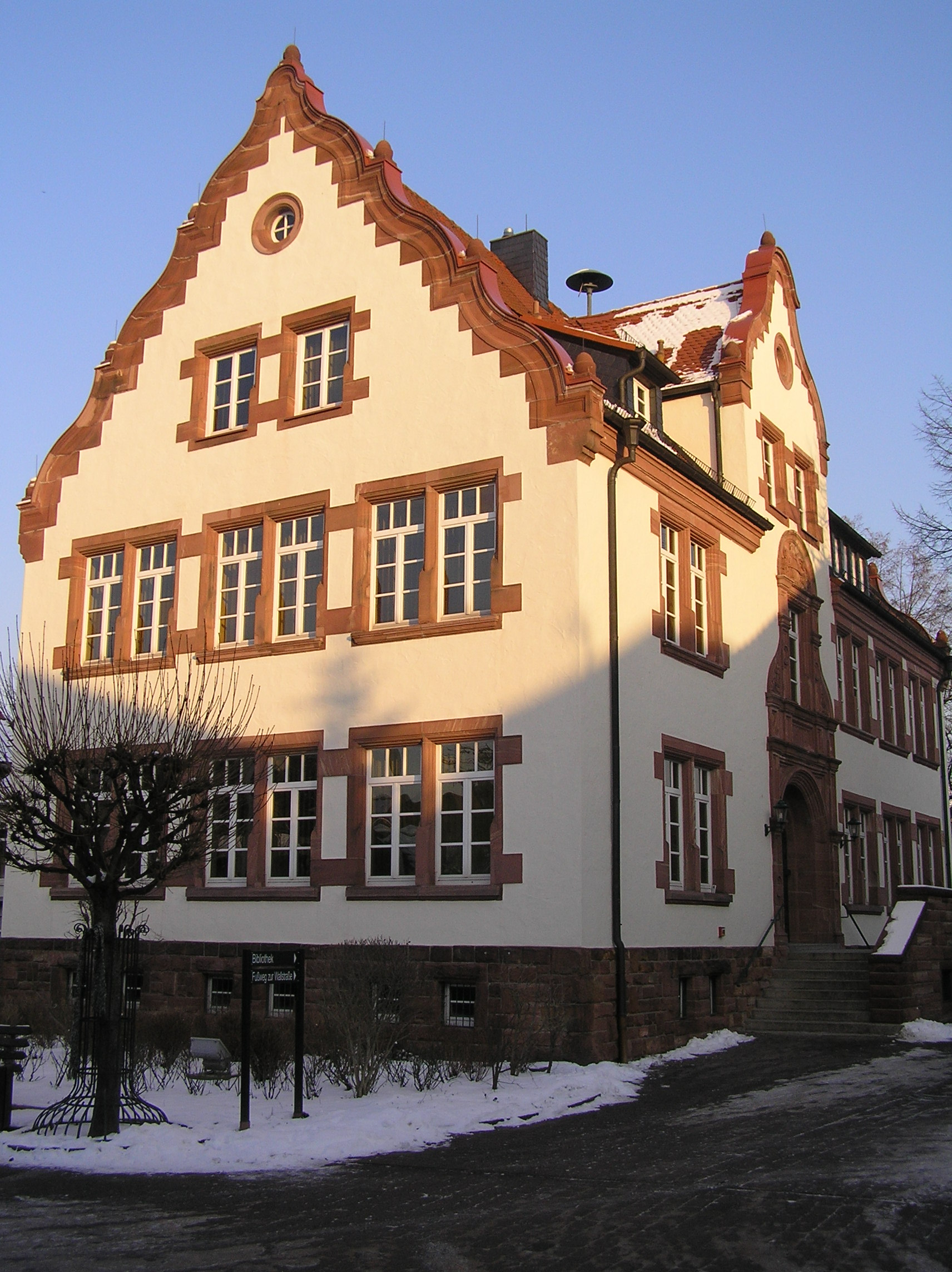
Town Hall

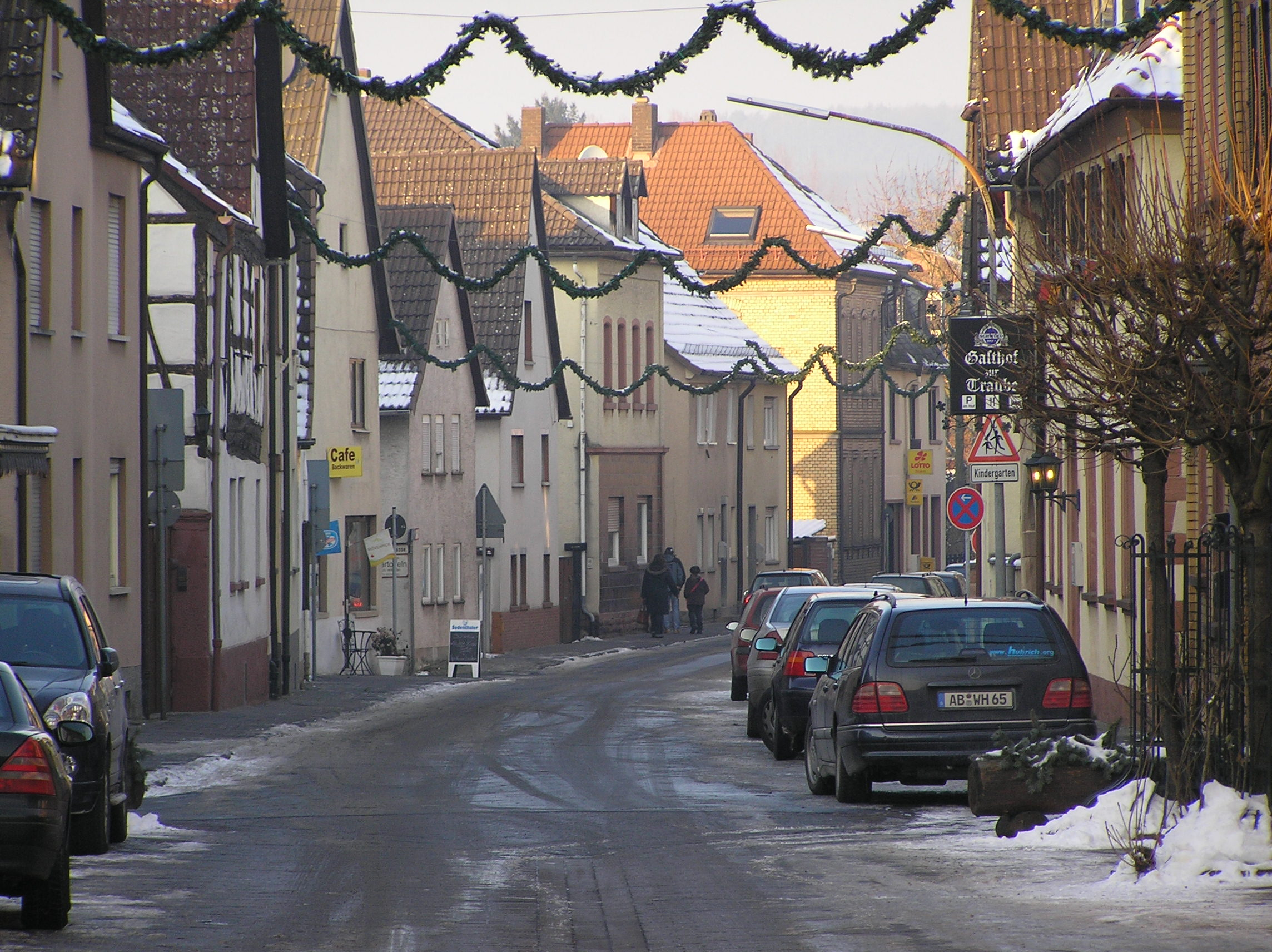
Main street

=== Population development ===
Within town limits, 4,778 inhabitants were counted in 1970, 4,876 in 1987 and in 2000 5,650.

== Politics ==
=== Mayors ===
The mayor is Thomas Köhler (CSU). In 2002 he succeeded Karl Heinz Bein (SPD). Thomas Köhler was confirmed in office in 2008, 2014 and 2020.

=== Community council ===
The council is made up of 20 council members with seats apportioned thus (2020–2026 term):

- CSU 7 seats
- Freie Wähler 6 seats
- SPD 4 seats
- Bündnis 90/Die Grünen 3 seat

Municipal taxes in 1999 amounted to €2,978,000 (converted), of which net business taxes amounted to €721,000.

=== Coat of arms ===
The community's arms might be described thus: Argent a Roman watchtower with a tent roof gules, in chief dexter an inescutcheon party per pale argent and sable with a bend sinister counterchanged, in chief sinister an inescutcheon of the second with a wheel spoked of six of the first.

The watchtower is a reference to the Limes Germanicus, built by the Roman Emperor Hadrian (117-138), which once ran along the river Main between Kleinwallstadt and the town across the river, Großwallstadt (klein and groß are German for “little” and “great” respectively). The inescutcheon on the dexter (armsbearer's right, viewer's left) side is the Focke von Wallstadt family's arms, and the one on the sinister (armsbearer's left, viewer's right) side is charged with the Wheel of Mainz, and refers to the community's long history as an Electoral Mainz holding, lasting until the Old Empire's downfall in 1803. The tinctures argent and gules (silver and red) also refer to Mainz's former overlordship.

The arms have been borne since 1955.

== Economy and infrastructure ==
According to official statistics, there were 6 workers on the social welfare contribution rolls working in agriculture and forestry in 1998. In producing businesses this was 606, and in trade and transport 176. In other areas, 366 workers on the social welfare contribution rolls were employed, and 1,879 such workers worked from home. There were 10 processing businesses. Five businesses were in construction, and furthermore, in 1999, there were 18 agricultural operations with a working area of 311 ha, of which 204 ha was cropland and 99 ha was meadowland.

=== Education ===
In 1999 the following institutions existed in Kleinwallstadt:

- Kindergartens: 250 places with 252 children
- Primary schools: 1 with 35 teachers and 610 pupils

== Twin towns – sister cities ==
Kleinwallstadt is twinned with:

- (France) - Saint-Pierre-en-Auge since 1991.
