= Heimbuchenthal =

- Municipality
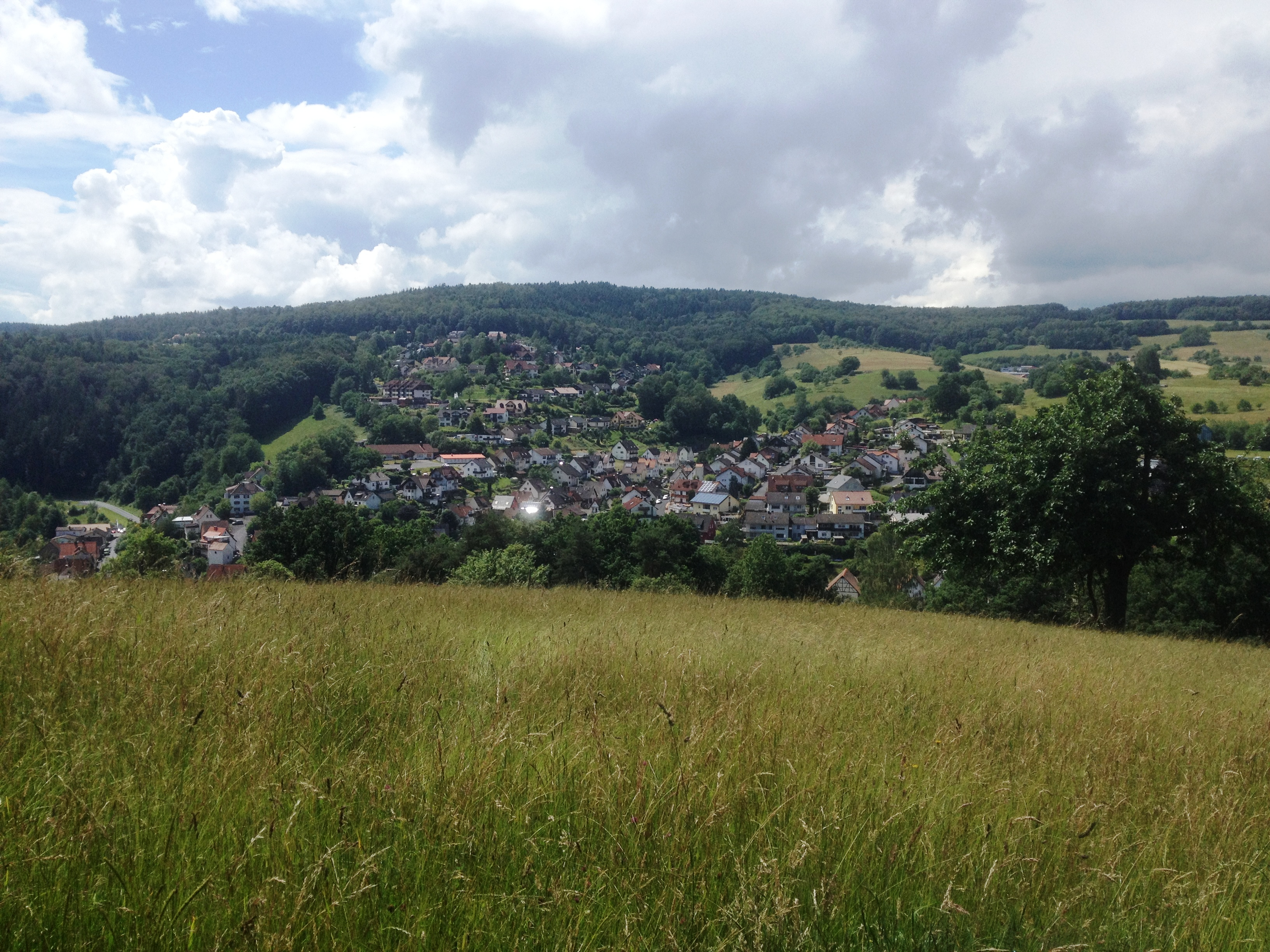
- View westwards from the Panoramaweg

- Coat of arms

- Location of Heimbuchenthal within Aschaffenburg district
- Interactive map of Heimbuchenthal
- Location within Germany Location within Bavaria
- Coordinates: 49°53′N 9°18′E
- Country: Germany
- State: Bavaria
- Admin. region: Unterfranken
- District: Aschaffenburg
- Municipal assoc.: Mespelbrunn

Government
  - Mayor (2020–26): Rüdiger Stenger

Area
  - Total: 17.15 km^{2} (6.62 sq mi)
- Elevation: 231 m (758 ft)

Population (2025-12-31)
  - Total: 2,128
  - Density: 124.1/km^{2} (321.4/sq mi)
- Time zone: UTC+01:00 (CET)
  - Summer (DST): UTC+02:00 (CEST)
- Postal codes: 63872, 63874 (Höllhammer)
- Dialling codes: 06092
- Vehicle registration: AB, ALZ
- Website: www.heimbuchenthal.de

Heimbuchenthal is a municipality in the Aschaffenburg district in the Regierungsbezirk of Lower Franconia (Unterfranken) in Bavaria, Germany, and the seat of the Verwaltungsgemeinschaft (Administrative Community) of Mespelbrunn. It is also a state-recognized recreational resort (Erholungsort).

== Geography ==
=== Location ===
Gemeindeteile

Heimbuchenthal lies in the Bavarian Lower Main (Bayerischer Untermain) in the upper valley of the Elsava in the Mittelgebirge (hill range) Spessart.

== History ==
In 1282, Heimbuchenthal, whose name comes from the hornbeams (Hainbuchen in German), had its first documentary mention. In 1495, the place was first named as a court centre. Along with the Archbishopric of Mainz, the former Vogteiamt (until 1782) passed at Secularization to the newly formed Principality of Aschaffenburg, with which it passed in 1814 (by this time it had become a department of the Grand Duchy of Frankfurt) to the Kingdom of Bavaria.

In 1982, there was a 700-year jubilee celebration which involved the dedication of a few tourist attractions.

== Demographics ==
Within the municipal area there were 1,875 inhabitants in 1970, 2,106 in 1987, 2,260 in 2000 and 2,154 in 2013

== Economy ==
According to official statistics, in 1998, there were 133 workers on the social welfare contribution rolls working in producing businesses. In trade and transport this was 27. In other areas, 176 workers on the social welfare contribution rolls were employed, and there were 808 remote workers. There are two processing businesses. Three businesses are in construction, and furthermore, in 1999, there were 4 agricultural operations with a working area of 29 ha.

Municipal tax revenue in 1999 amounted to €1,211,000 (converted), of which business taxes (net) amounted to €287,000.

== Attractions ==
=== Heimathenhof ===
One kilometre west of the municipality is found the Heimathenhof, a former estate converted to a hotel and an inn. Right at the estate, red and fallow deer can be seen in a broad enclosure.

=== Höllhammer ===
Some 4 km southwards in the Elsava valley lies the Höllhammer pond with a former hammerworks. First mentioned in the late 13th century was a hunting lodge called Mulen, along with a forester's seat, a Forsthube. In 1535, the lordly building was already in ruins and the Counts of Ingelheim, who already had their seat at nearby Mespelbrunn Castle, then had an estate built there, which was named Höllenhof after the nearby Höllschlucht (a gorge).

About 1700 came the first hammerworks, driven by a mill, which took its name, Höllhammer, from the estate. The hammerworks, which in 1795 had been taken over by Georg Ludwig Rexroth, was said in the early 19th century to be “the first and most productive hammerworks” in the Principality of Aschaffenburg. About 1830 some 100 people lived at the Höllhammer and the specially built school was attended by up to 30 children. Until 1891, production continued. Thereafter the lands were converted into an estate. Still to be seen are the farmhands’ house with the belltower, the lord's house and the school. The buildings are all used as dwellings, even the old smithies. In the woods is found the Rexroth family's old graveyard.

Today, the Höllhammer is private property and not accessible to the public.

=== Others ===
Fahrradmuseum Pedalwelt – modern bicycle development and drive concepts from all over the world (with test course).

== Government ==
=== Municipal council ===
The council is made up of 15 council members, counting the mayor.

	CSU/Bürgervereinigung	SPD/FWG	Total
2008	7	8	15 seats
(as at municipal election held on 2 March 2008)

=== Mayor ===
The mayor is Rüdiger Stenger (SPD/FWG).

=== Town twinning ===
- Thury-Harcourt, Calvados, France since 1988

=== Coat of arms ===
The municipality's arms might be described thus: Gules a fess wavy argent, in chief three beech leaves of the first, two in saltire surmounted by the third palewise, issuant from the base a cogwheel spoked of five of the first.

The German blazon does not mention the cogwheel's spokes.

The beech leaves in the arms refer to the geographical location in the High Spessart and are canting for the municipality's name (Buchen is German for “beeches”). The wavy fess (horizontal band) symbolizes the municipality's location in the Elsava valley. The combination of the wavy fess and the cogwheel refers to the hammerworks that was running in the 18th and 19th centuries in the outlying centre of Höllhammer. The tinctures gules and argent (red and silver) are those also seen in the Electoral Mainz coat of arms, Mainz having held the local lordship until 1803. The Electoral Mainz Amt in the municipality comprised eight places and gave it a certain autonomy.

The arms have been borne since September 1981.

== Education ==
Heimbuchenthal features the following institutions (as of 2006):

- Kindergartens: 75 kindergarten places with 68 children
- Elementary schools: 1 with 15 teachers and 201 pupils
