= Lärchhöhe =

Mountain in Bavaria, Germany

Coordinates: 49°53′58″N 9°25′09″E

Highest point
- Elevation: 593 m (1,946 ft)

Geography
- Location: Bavaria, Germany
- Parent range: Spessart

Lärchhöhe is a mountain located in Bavaria (Bayern), Germany, within the administrative district of Aschaffenburg (Landkreis Aschaffenburg), in the Spessart range.

The peak rises modestly relative to surrounding terrain and is somewhat overshadowed by nearby hills (notably Geiersberg).

Lärchhöhe offers a serene forest‑hiking experience. Because of its lower elevation and moderate terrain, it is accessible for casual hikers, although the wooded cover obscures high‑altitude views.
