= Markberg =

Hill in Hesse, Germany

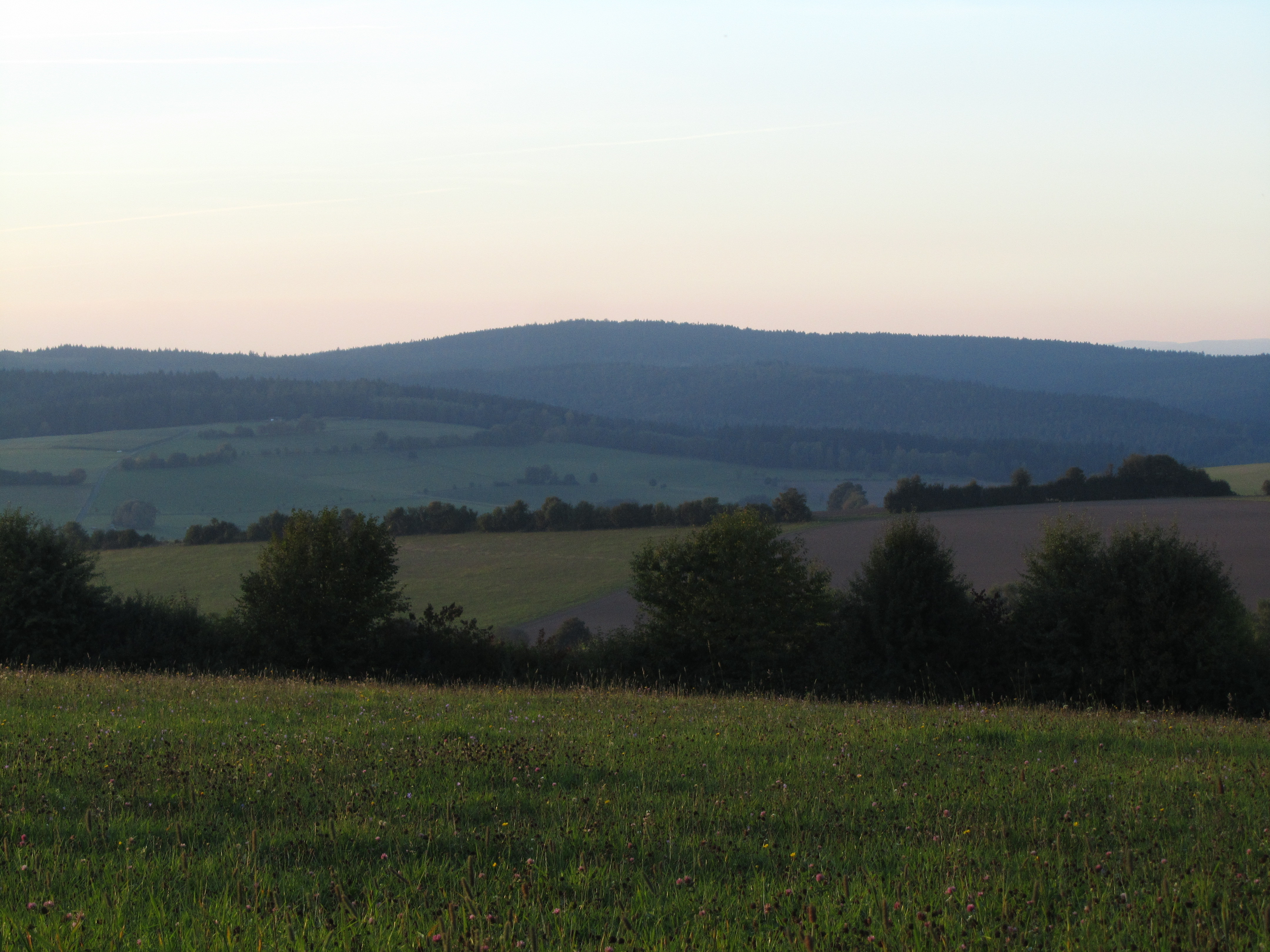
- Markberg

Highest point
- Elevation: 516 m (1,693 ft)
- Coordinates: 50°13′35″N 9°26′04″E

Geography
- Location within Germany
- Location: Hesse, Germany
- Parent range: Spessart

Markberg is a hill of Hesse, Germany.
