= Eselsweg =

Hiking trail in Germany

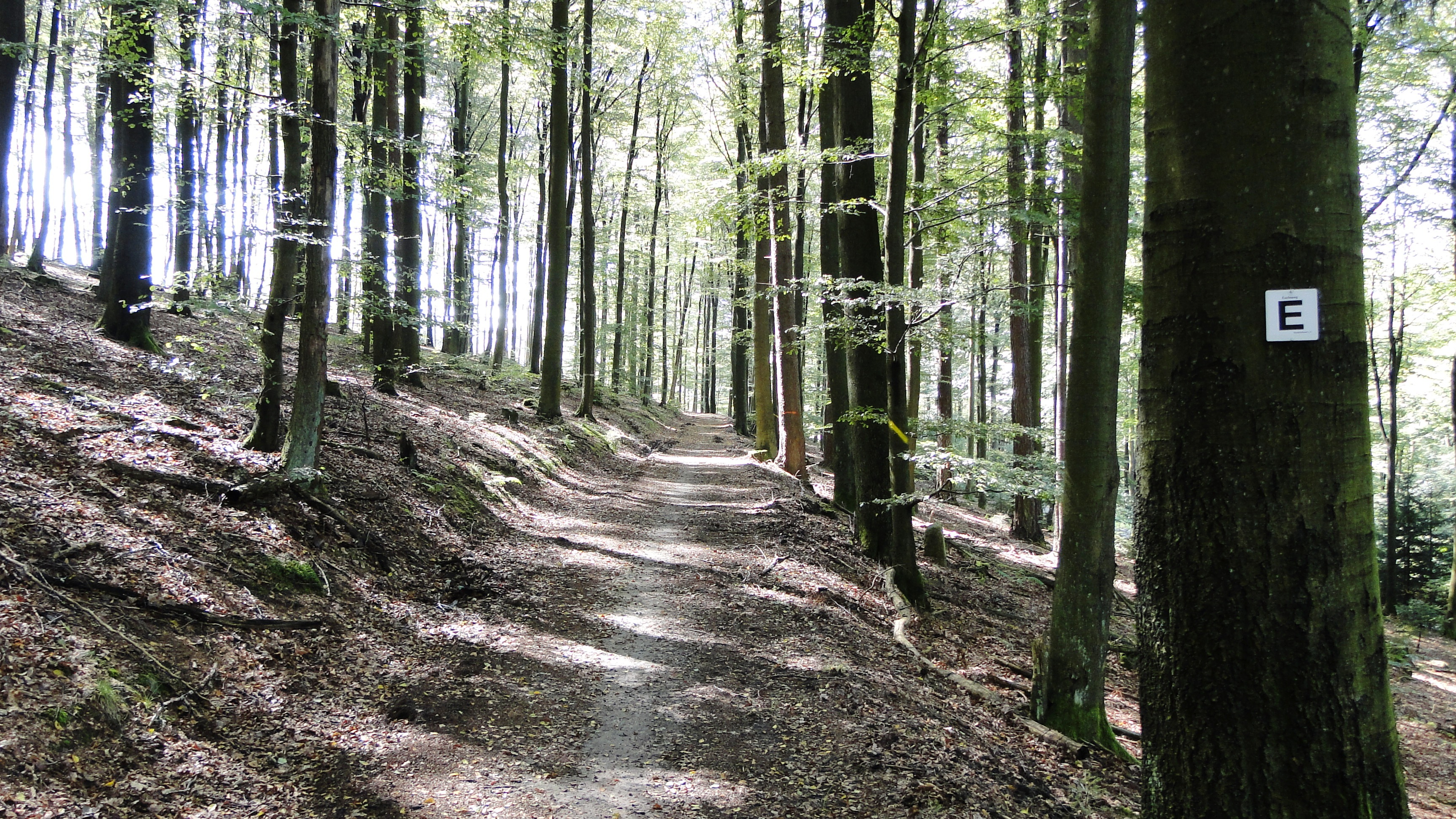
- Eselsweg near Rohrbrunn
- Length: 111 km (69 mi)
- Location: Naturpark Hessischer Spessart, Naturpark Bayerischer Spessart Germany
- Trailheads: Schlüchtern, Großheubach, numerous places in between
- Use: Hiking
- Elevation gain/loss: 2,071 metres (6,790 ft) gain in; 2,078 metres (6,820 ft) gain out
- Highest point: 525 m above sea level (east of Bad Orb)
- Lowest point: 212 m above sea level (western start near Schlüchtern)
- Waymark: black "E" on white
- Surface: natural paths (35%), gravel on forest roads (60%), tarmac (5%)
- Website: www.spessartbund.de

The Eselsweg (English: "donkey trail") is a long-distance hiking trail that follows an ancient trade route through the Mittelgebirge Spessart, in the states of Hesse and Bavaria, Germany. It is 111 km long and leads from Schlüchtern in the valley of the Kinzig river to Großheubach on the river Main. The trail follows an ancient trade route on which donkey caravans used to transport salt, thus giving rise to the name.

== History ==
The historic road Eselsweg has likely been in use since prehistoric times. It may have connected Celtic circular ramparts, found for example at Bürgstadt and Miltenberg to similar places near the Kinzig, such as the Alteburg. Since in pre-modern times the valleys of the Spessart were often swampy and water-logged, the path stuck to the higher elevations. This route also avoided the need for constant climbing into and out of the river valleys. The route's name derives from the caravans of donkeys used in the Middle Ages to transport salt from Orb to Miltenberg, where it was either loaded on ships or carried on by land. Miltenberg was an important toll station set up by the Archbishop of Mainz. The Eselsweg was first mentioned in 1339 as "Eßelspfadt".

== Route ==
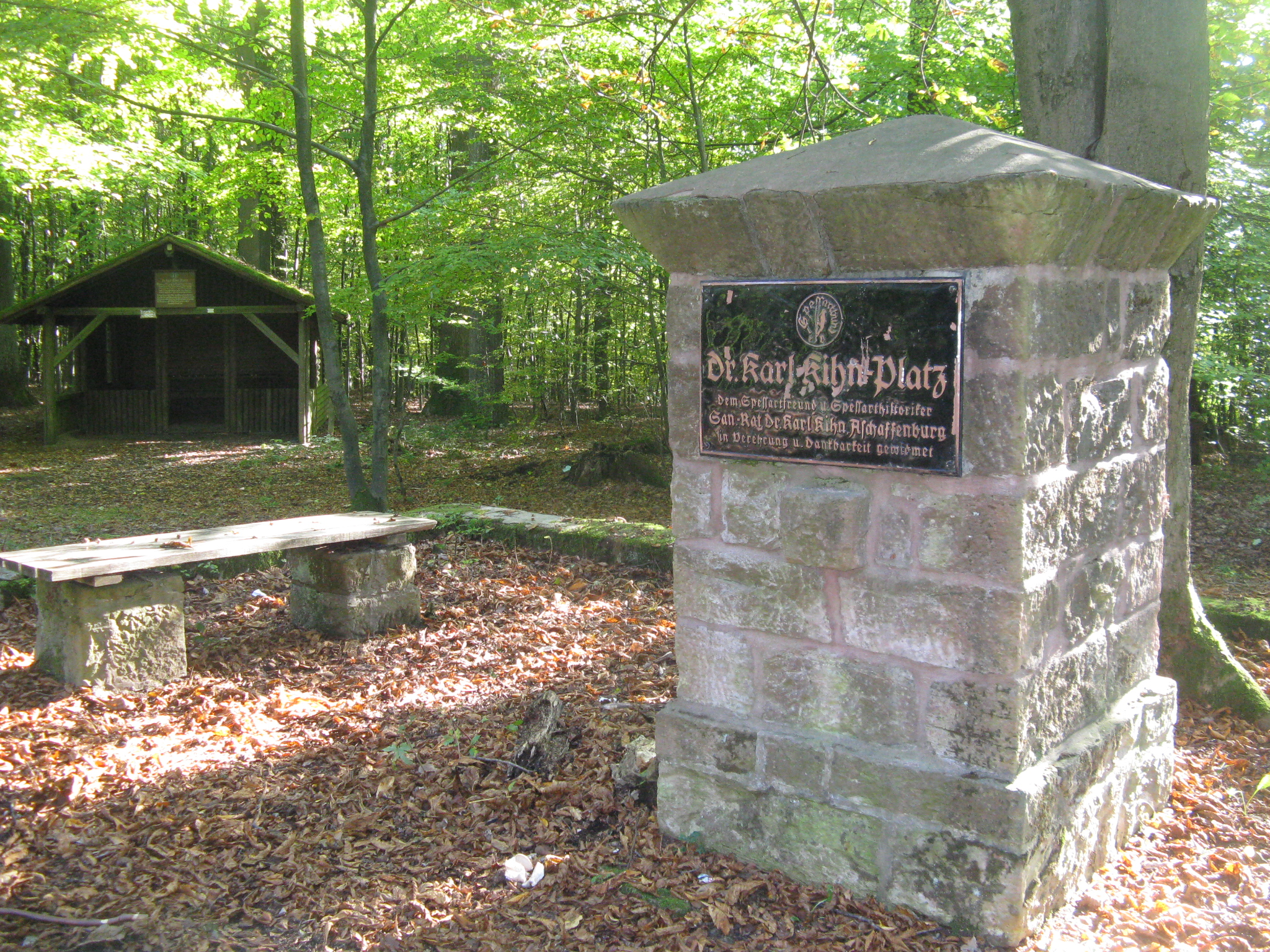
Dr.-Kihn-Platz where Eselsweg and Birkenhainer Strasse meet

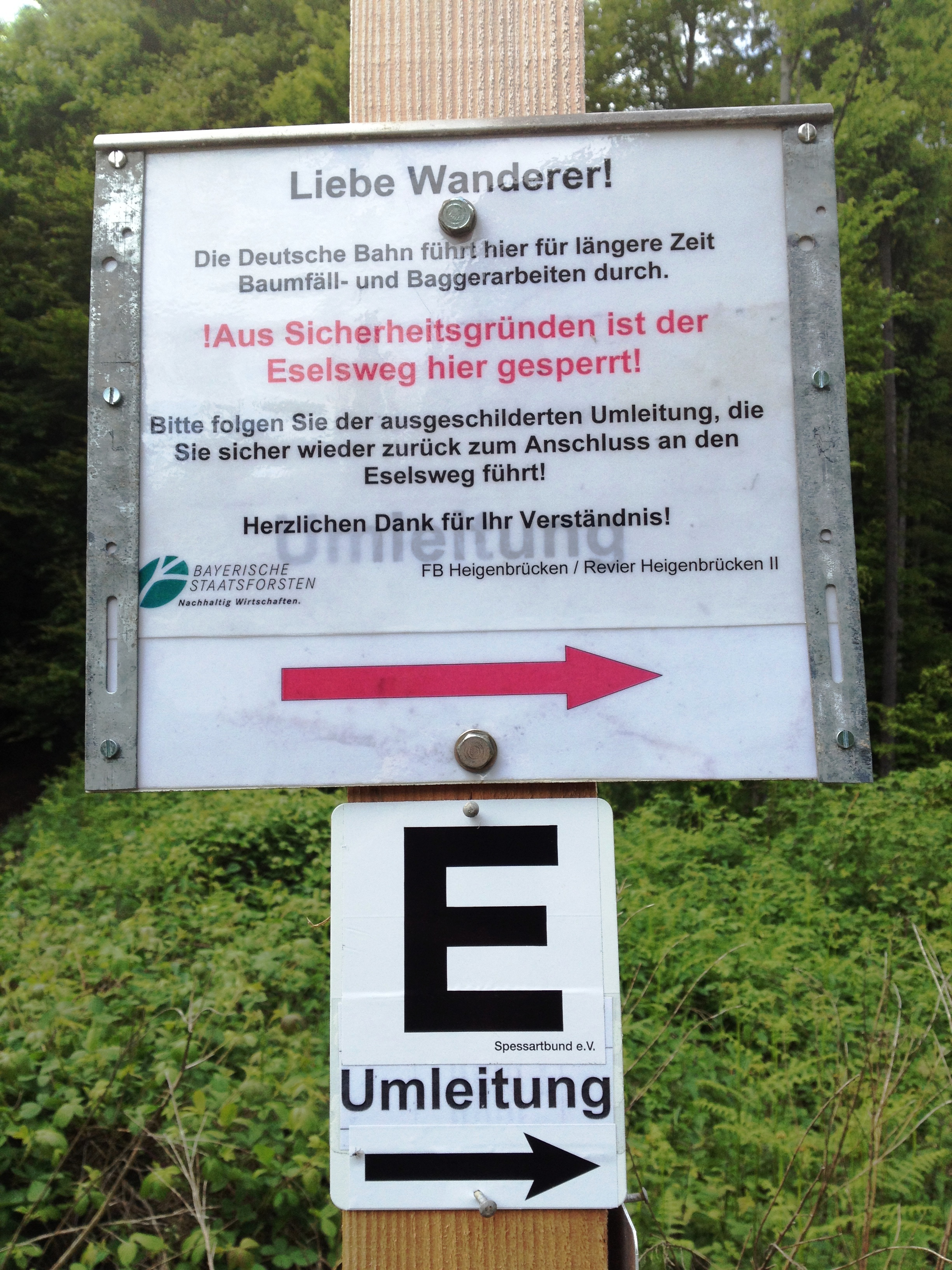
Official detour sign on the Eselsweg near Heigenbrücken due to forestry work conducted by Deutsche Bahn, 2013

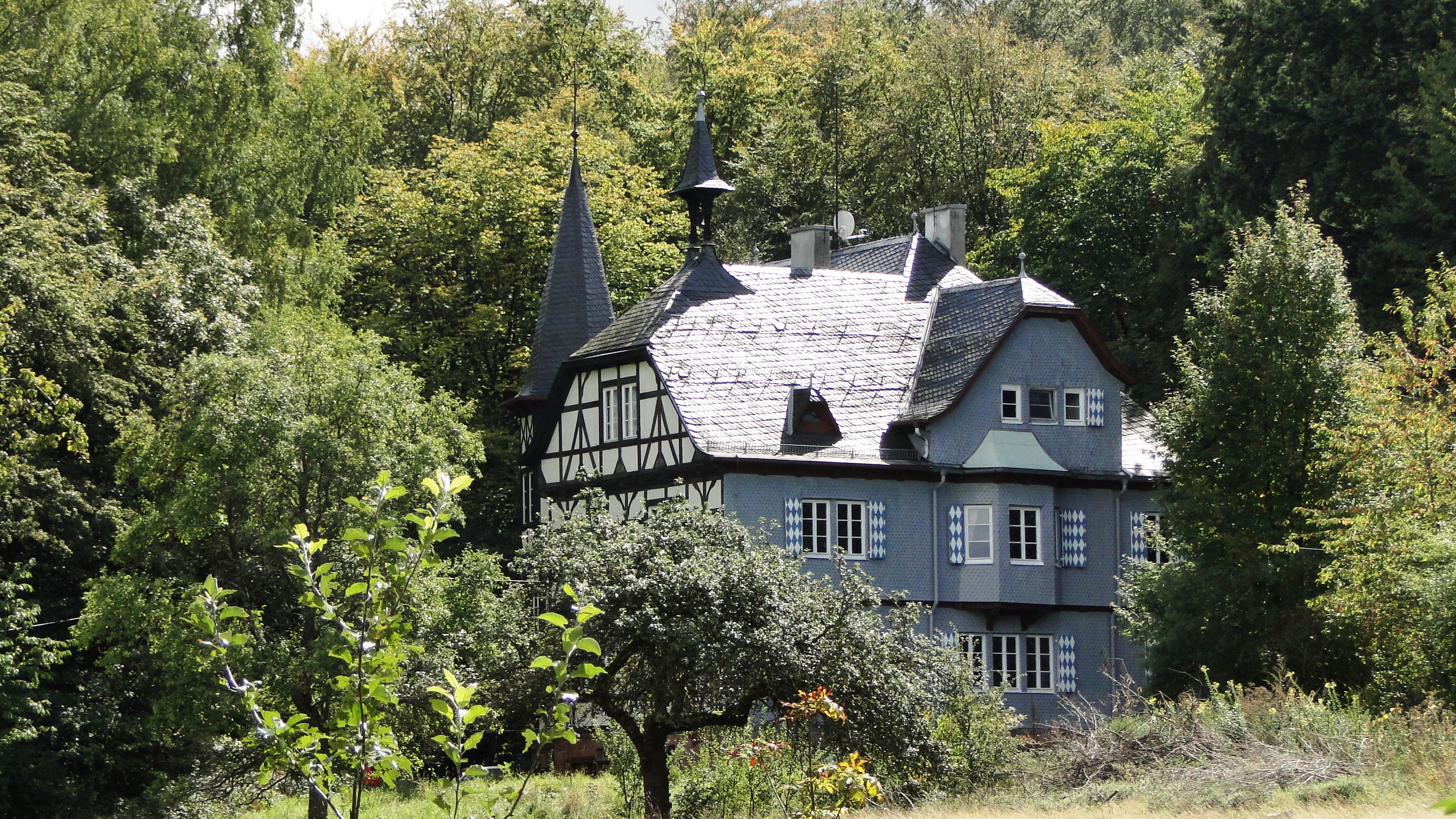
Schloss Luitpoldshöhe near Rohrbrunn

The modern hiking trail mostly follows the historic route and crosses the Spessart as a high route which sticks to the peaks and ridges and avoids the valleys and villages. It is maintained and signposted by the Spessartbund with a black "E" on white.

The Eselsweg hiking trail starts at the train station of Schlüchtern, Main-Kinzig. It then climbs from the Kinzig valley into the Spessart hills and goes roughly southwest and then south. Near the Wiesbüttmoor, it reaches the Bavarian border and follows it west before turning south again, entering the Landkreis Aschaffenburg. In this area, the Eselsweg also touches another ancient trade route, the Birkenhainer Strasse. The two trails run alongside each other to the Dr.-Kihn-Platz, where they part ways. The Eselsweg continues to lead mostly in a southerly direction, until it crosses the Autobahn 3 at Weibersbrunn before looping west and south back to the Autobahn at Rohrbrunn, a possible location of the inn that inspired a story by Wilhelm Hauff and the movie The Spessart Inn. The trail passes a hunting lodge used by Luitpold, Prince Regent of Bavaria, Schloss Luitpoldshöhe, and snakes southwards and southwest, entering the Landkreis Miltenberg. It reaches the Main valley at the Kloster Engelberg, above Großheubach and then leads down over 600 steps (Engelsstaffeln) into the town.

For most of its length after the initial climb the trail stays at an elevation between 400 m and 500 m and sports few significant climbs. It mostly passes through mixed coniferous forest. The only villages the trail directly touches are: Lettgenbrunn (a part of Jossgrund) and Weibersbrunn. It also passes quite close to the villages of Flörsbach (a part of Flörsbachtal) and Wildensee (a part of Eschau) as well as to Heigenbrücken, a larger town.
