= Geiersberg (Spessart) =

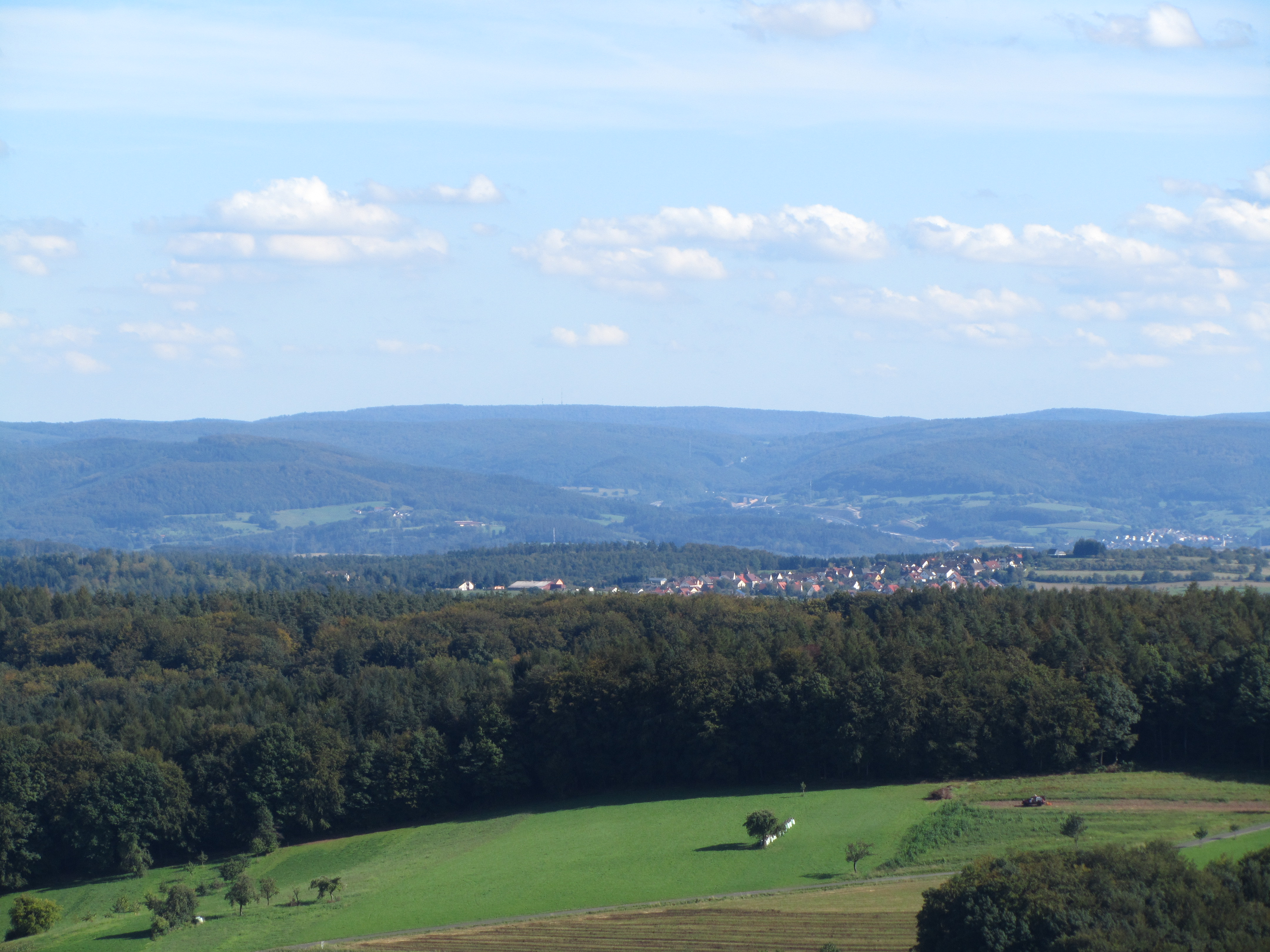
- Geiersberg, seen from Hahnenkamm

Highest point
- Elevation: 586 m (1,923 ft)
- Coordinates: 49°54′09″N 9°25′43″E

Geography
- Location within Bavaria
- Location: Bavaria, Germany
- Parent range: Spessart

Geiersberg (Spessart), also named Breitsol is a hill in the Spessart range in Bavaria, Germany. It is the highest elevation of the Spessart.
