= Heubach (Main) =

River in Germany

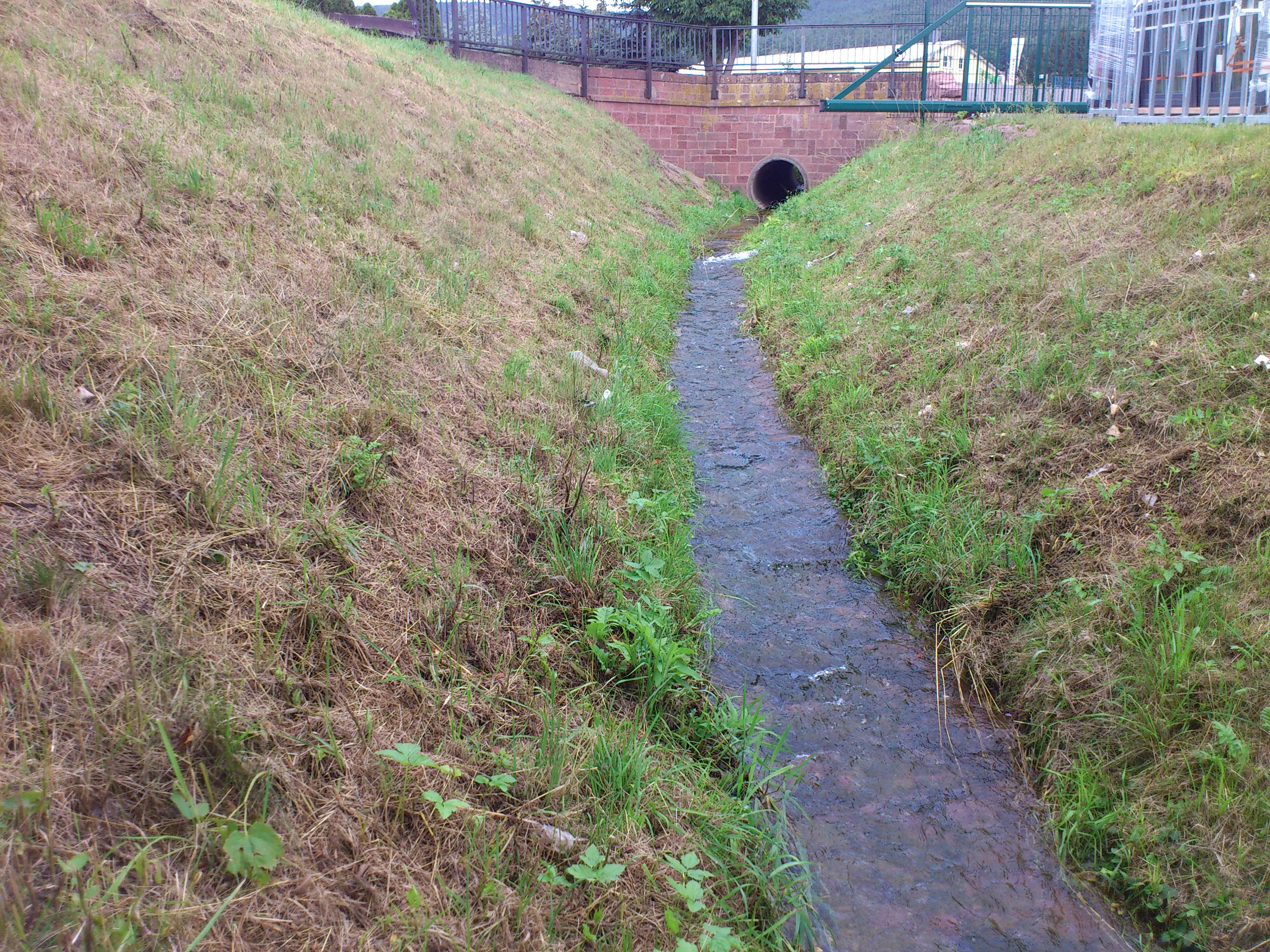
- The Heubach in Großheubach

Location
- Country: Germany
- States: Bavaria

Physical characteristics
- Mouth
  - location: Main at Großheubach
  - coordinates: 49.7247°N 9.2185°E

Basin features
- Progression: Main→ Rhine→ North Sea

Heubach is a river of Bavaria, Germany. It flows into the Main at Großheubach.

== See also ==
- List of rivers of Bavaria
