= Engelberg Friary =

Kloster Engelberg Engelberg Friary
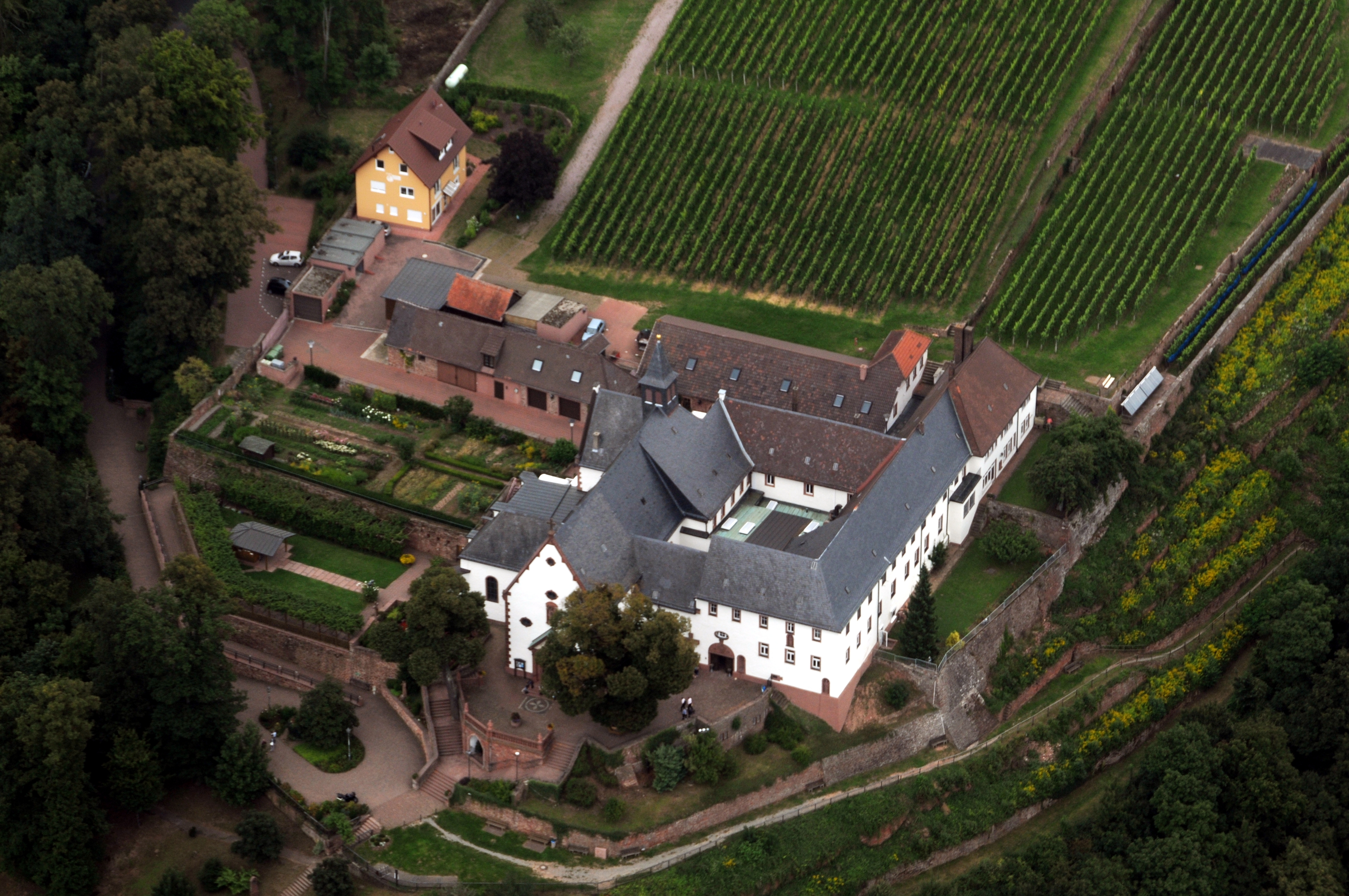
- Aerial view from 2008

- Location within Germany
- Interactive map of Kloster Engelberg; Engelberg Friary

Monastery information
- Order: Franciscan
- Established: 1630s
- Dedication: B.V. Mariae gloriosae
- Diocese: Würzburg

People
- Founder: Cologne Observantenprovinz of the Franciscans

Architecture
- Heritage designation: listed monument
- Style: mostly Baroque

Site
- Location: Grossheubach, Bavaria, Germany
- Coordinates: 49°43′26″N 9°13′55″E
- Public access: yes (limited)

Engelberg Friary (Kloster Engelberg, also Kloster Engelberg über dem Main) is a Franciscan friary in Grossheubach in Bavaria, Germany. In the past, a pilgrimage dedicated to a figure of Mary, documented as far back as 1406, was administered by the Capuchins after 1630. Following secularization in the early 19th century, the Capuchins eventually left and the Franciscan Order took over the premises and caring for the pilgrims. The friary is (partially) open to the public.

== Location ==
Kloster Engelberg is located on the Engelberg ("hill of Angels") above the town of Grossheubach, on the right bank of the river Main near the district town of Miltenberg.

It is passed by the long-distance hiking trail Eselsweg which connects Schlüchtern to Grossheubach and follows the route of a historic road that was used to transport salt across the Spessart range.

== History ==
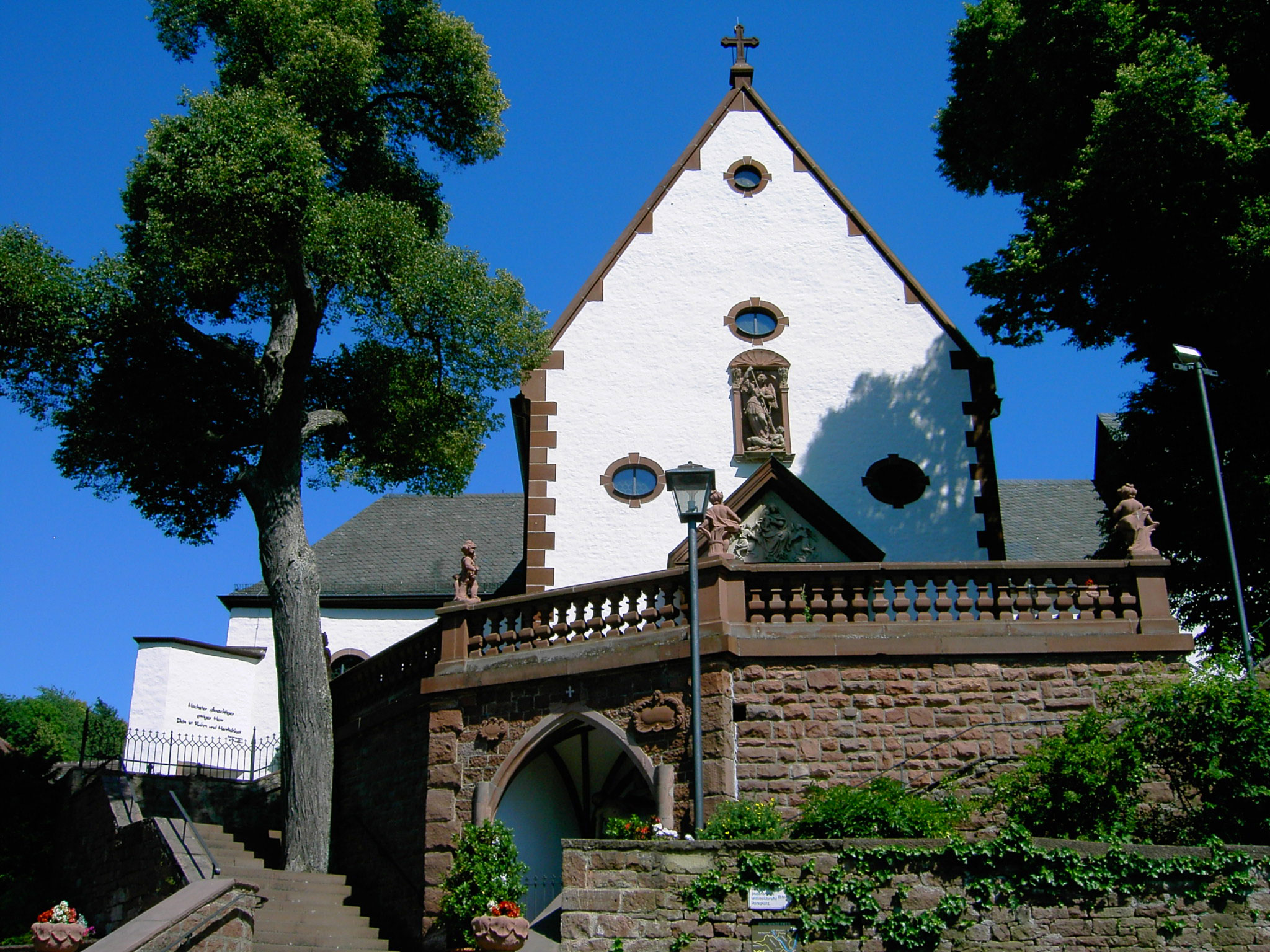
The church

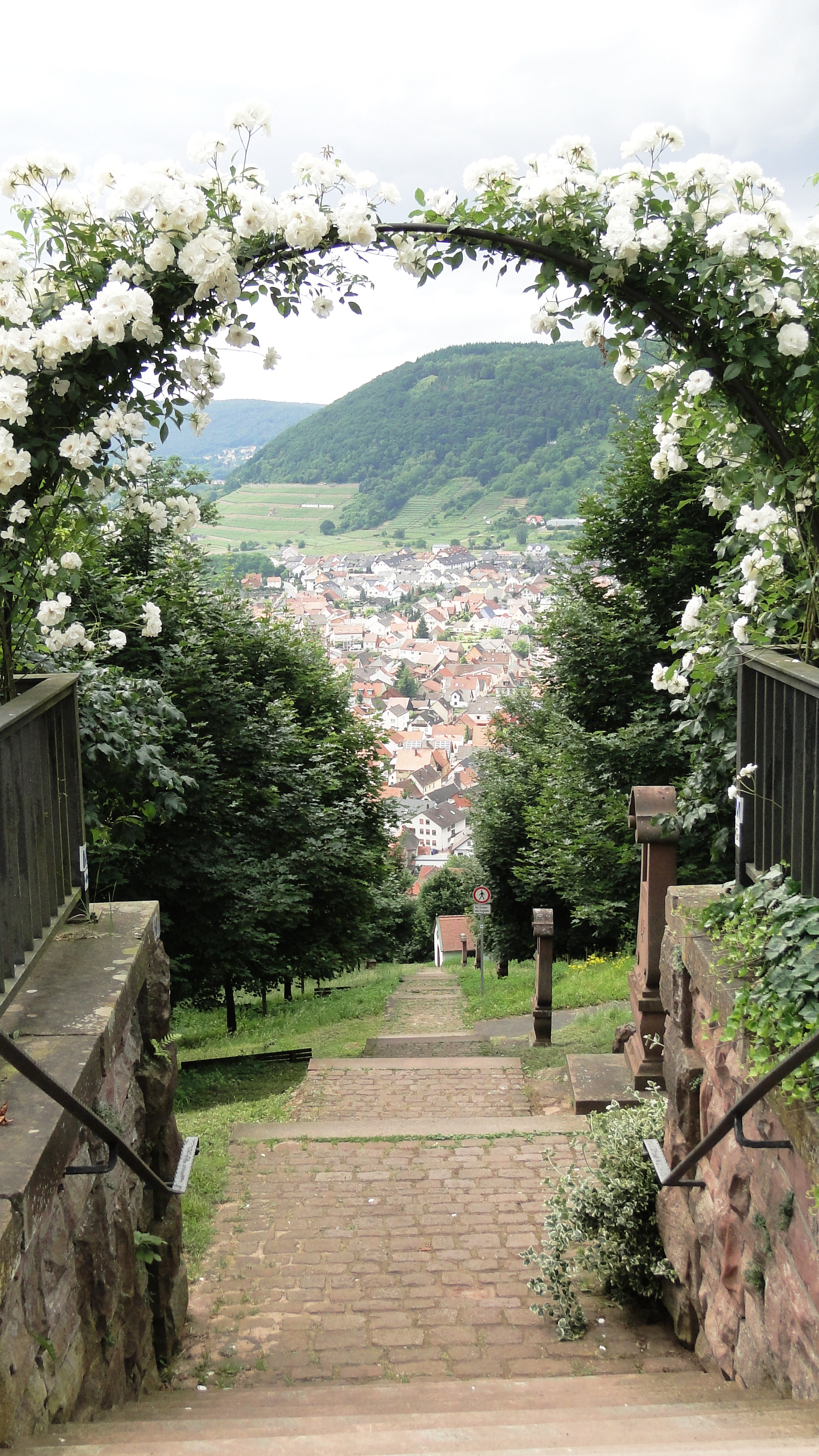
Engelsstaffeln down to Grossheubach

The hill spur on which the friary is situated was likely used in prehistoric times as a cult site. Around 1300, a wooden chapel dedicated to St. Michael was built there and a statue of the Virgin Mary erected before 1400. The likely location of this chapel was where the choir of today's church stands. The first documented pilgrimage took place in 1406. In 1469, a brotherhood was established in connection with the Engelberg pilgrimage. In 1483, Grossheubach came to the Archbishop of Mainz in a land swap with the Teutonic Order that had held the village and its surroundings since 1291.

In 1630, Anselm Kasimir von Wambold, Archbishop of Mainz, asked Capuchins from the Rhenish Province to come here. The conventual buildings were finished by 1639. At the same time the church was enlarged and largely achieved its current, Baroque, form. After 1647, the friary had the status of Konvent (previously it had been a pilgrims' Hospiz). In 1697, the Antonius chapel was added. In 1701, the Gnadenbild der Freudenreichen Muttergottes (statue of Mary) from the early or mid-14th century was set up in a new side-chapel on the right.

When the German ecclesiastical states were secularized in the early 19th century in what is known as the German mediatization, Engelberg was initially not much affected. The acceptance of novices was forbidden, however, setting it up for eventual extinction. In 1817, the Gymnasium (school) was dissolved. However, in 1828, King Ludwig I of Bavaria ordered the Capuchin friars to move to Aschaffenburg. The community was refounded, but Franciscans of the Bavarian Order Province took over in taking care of pilgrims.

A burial chapel for the Catholic branch of the House of Löwenstein was built next to the church (the friary had been their burial site since 1728). In 1899, the church was enlarged towards the west. A terrace was added as well as the room which today serves as a confessional chapel.

The pilgrimage continues. Well into the post-WWII period, some pilgrims climbed the steps to the church on their knees while praying.

== Description ==
The pilgrimage way (612 steps of red sandstone, the so-called Engelsstaffeln) through the vineyards from Grossheubach features 14 Baroque chapels and 14 Stations of the Cross from 1866.

The current, mostly Baroque, conventual buildings are quite simple architecturally, reflecting their origins during the Thirty Years' War. Back then, measured by its message, the most important work of art was the larger-than-life statue of St. Michael set above the church portal, created by Zacharias Juncker the Older (from the Juncker family of sculptors) around 1635. It references a much more significant statue of the saint created by Hubert Gerhard for the Michaelskirche at Munich. The statue at Engelberg was erected after the Protestant Swedish had been beaten and driven out of Franconia, turning the friary into a monument to the resurrected power of the Catholic faith.

The early 14th-century statue of Mary is still on display today in a side chapel of the church. It is around 75 cm tall, carved from wood and painted. The sitting figure holds a sceptre in the right hand and the left arm is wrapped around the boy Jesus. Due to its smiling face, it is known as German: freudenreich (joyful). This is the figure at the centre of the pilgrimage. The oldest (Gothic) part of the church, is behind the high altar, only created in 1909. Two other side altars were added around the same time. The one on the right, with a crucifixion scene, originally dates from the early 18th century. The other was stylistically matched to the older altar. This one shows St. Francis putting his arms around Christ on the cross. The ceiling and wall paintings also date to the early 20th century.

== Today ==
It remains one of the most important sites of pilgrimages in the Würzburg diocese.

The church and some other areas of the friary are open to visitors. The order runs a restaurant and shop in the buildings. The restaurant offers wine grown by the friary and beer brewed by the Franciscans.
