= Spessart Nature Park =

Nature park in Germany

Coordinates: 49.9833°N 9.4166°E

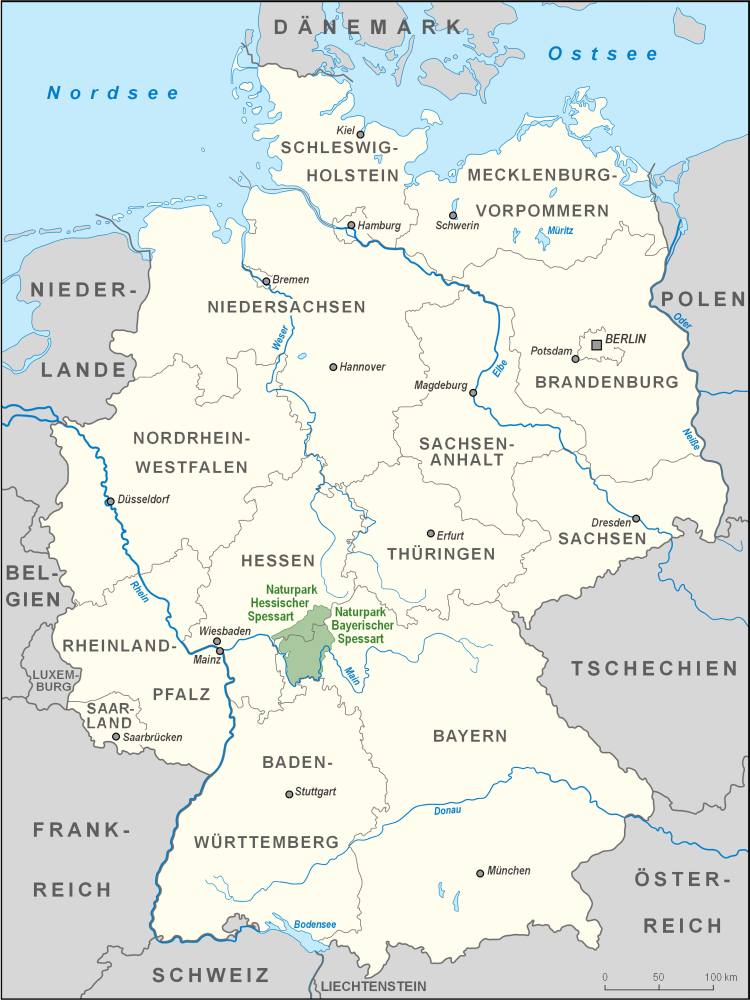
Location of the Bavarian and Hessian Spessart

Logo of the nature park

Spessart Nature Park (German: Naturpark Spessart) is a nature park in Germany, managed by Naturpark Spessart e. V. The park spans the states of Hesse and Bavaria, and covers an area of 2,440 km² within the German mountain range known as the Spessart. The geological foundation of the park is formed by a Bunter sandstone plate, up to about 400 metres thick, which tilts towards the southeast. The nature park includes the largest contiguous area of mixed forest in Germany. Deep valleys, gentle hillsides and heights characterise the landscape of the Spessart.

Spessart Nature Park consists of two parts:

- The Bavarian Spessart Nature Park (Naturpark Bayerischer Spessart), founded in 1961, in Northwestern Bavaria, which covers an area of 1,710 km² and lies in the so-called Main rectangle.
- The Hessian Spessart Nature Park (Naturpark Hessischer Spessart), founded in 1962, in southeastern Hesse, which has an area of 730 km² and lies in the northern Spessart, south of the A 66 motorway between Hanau and Schlüchtern. A large clearing known as the Bergfeld is within the Hessian portion of the park.

== See also ==
- List of nature parks in Germany
