= Großheubach =

- Municipality
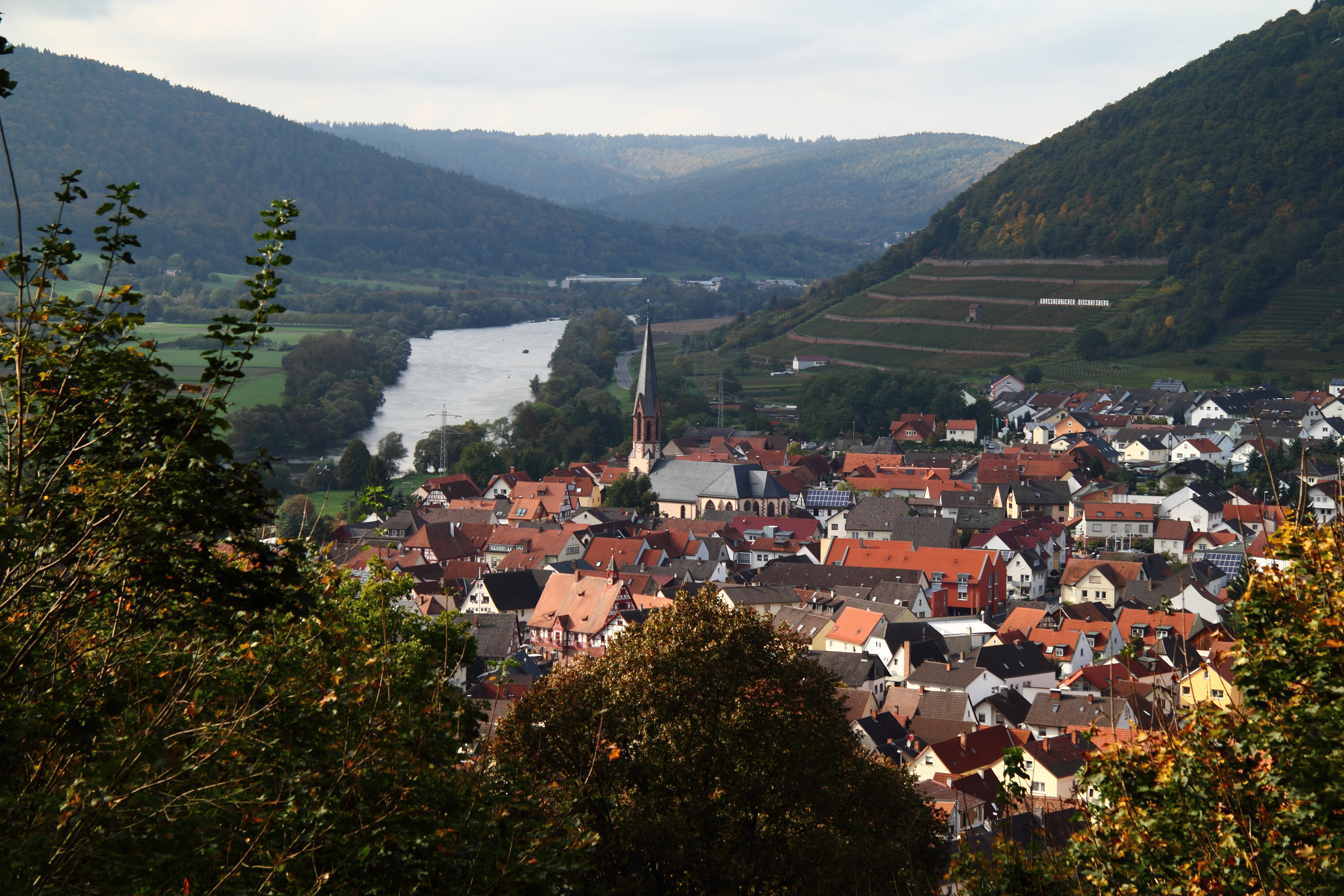
- Großheubach, seen from Engelberg

- Coat of arms

- Location of Großheubach within Miltenberg district
- Interactive map of Großheubach
- Location within Germany Location within Bavaria
- Coordinates: 49°44′N 09°14′E
- Country: Germany
- State: Bavaria
- Admin. region: Unterfranken
- District: Miltenberg

Government
  - Mayor (2020–26): Gernot Winter

Area
  - Total: 19.00 km^{2} (7.34 sq mi)
- Elevation: 132 m (433 ft)

Population (2025-12-31)
  - Total: 4,963
  - Density: 261.2/km^{2} (676.5/sq mi)
- Time zone: UTC+01:00 (CET)
  - Summer (DST): UTC+02:00 (CEST)
- Postal codes: 63920
- Dialling codes: 09371
- Vehicle registration: MIL
- Website: www.grossheubach.de

Großheubach (or Grossheubach) is a market municipality in the Miltenberg district in the Regierungsbezirk (administrative division) of Lower Franconia (Unterfranken) in Bavaria, Germany.

== Geography ==
=== Location ===
Großheubach lies on the right bank of the Main. The community is located on the slopes of the Mittelgebirge Spessart. The highest point in the municipal area is the 439 m-high Ospisrain. Großheubach is located on the Fränkischer Rotwein Wanderweg ("Franconian Red Wine Hiking Trail"). Across the Main lie the hills of the Odenwald.

=== Subdivisions ===
The hamlets of Klotzenhof and Roßhof are part of the municipality Großheubach.

== History ==
Earlier names for Großheubach are Heidebah (mentioned in 878) and Grotzenheidbach (1358). Großheubach derives from the name of the stream Heubach which flows into the Main here. The area was settled by 1000 BC, as witnessed by urnfields and graves. Local wine growing is first mentioned in the 11th century AD. As of the late 12th century, the place was held by the Lords of Klingenberg. In 1291, the Teutonic Knights purchased the village and its surroundings. About 1300, the community's first wooden chapel was built on the Rulesberg (hill), now known as the Engelberg. From 1483, Großheubach belonged to the Archbishopric of Mainz.

In 1612, the historic town hall was built.

In 1803, the Archbishopric of Mainz was secularized. By way of the Grand Duchy of Frankfurt, Großheubach came to the Kingdom of Bavaria in 1816. In 1828, Kloster Engelberg was taken over by the Franciscans.

In 1896, the old town church was expanded and the parish church thereby came into being.

== Governance ==
=== Community council ===
The local council has 20 members (Elections in 2020):

- CSU: 7 seats
- Freie Wähler: 5 seats
- Heimat mit Zukunft: 5 seats
- SPD: 3 seats

=== Mayors ===
Gernot Winter (CSU): Mayor since May 2020.

- Former mayors:
- Josef Zipf: 1933 - 1940
- Felix Straub: 1940 - 1942
- Anton Blatz: 1942 - 1945
- Otto Kempf: 1945 - 1946
- Josef Heinrich Wolf: 1946 - 1948
- Richard Galmbacher: 1948 - 1967
- Franz Hegmann: 1967 - 1990
- Günther Oettinger: 1990 - 2020

=== Coat of arms ===
The community's arms might be described thus: Per pale, argent a saltire pattée sable and gules a wheel spoked of six of the first.

The black saltire (X-shaped cross) comes from a village court seal from 1654 and refers to the hegemony once exercised by the Teutonic Knights (although their coat of arms showed an upright cross). The Wheel of Mainz and the tinctures argent and gules (silver and red) refer to the community's later feudal overlord, the Archbishopric of Mainz, which held Großheubach until the end of the Old Empire in 1803.

The arms have been borne since 1956.

== Engelberg Friary ==
The Engelberg Friary with its pilgrimage church was founded about 1300. The building, built in 1630 for the Order of Friars Minor Capuchin, was on king Ludwig I of Bavaria's orders turned over to the Bavarian Franciscan monks. The Engelberg, the hill on which the friary stands, which is 250 m above sea level, can be reached over the 612 so-called Engelstaffeln (roughly, "Angel's Steps") made out of bunter.

== Notable people ==
- Guido Kratschmer (born 1953), Olympic decathlete and medallist
