= Spessart =

Mountain range in Germany

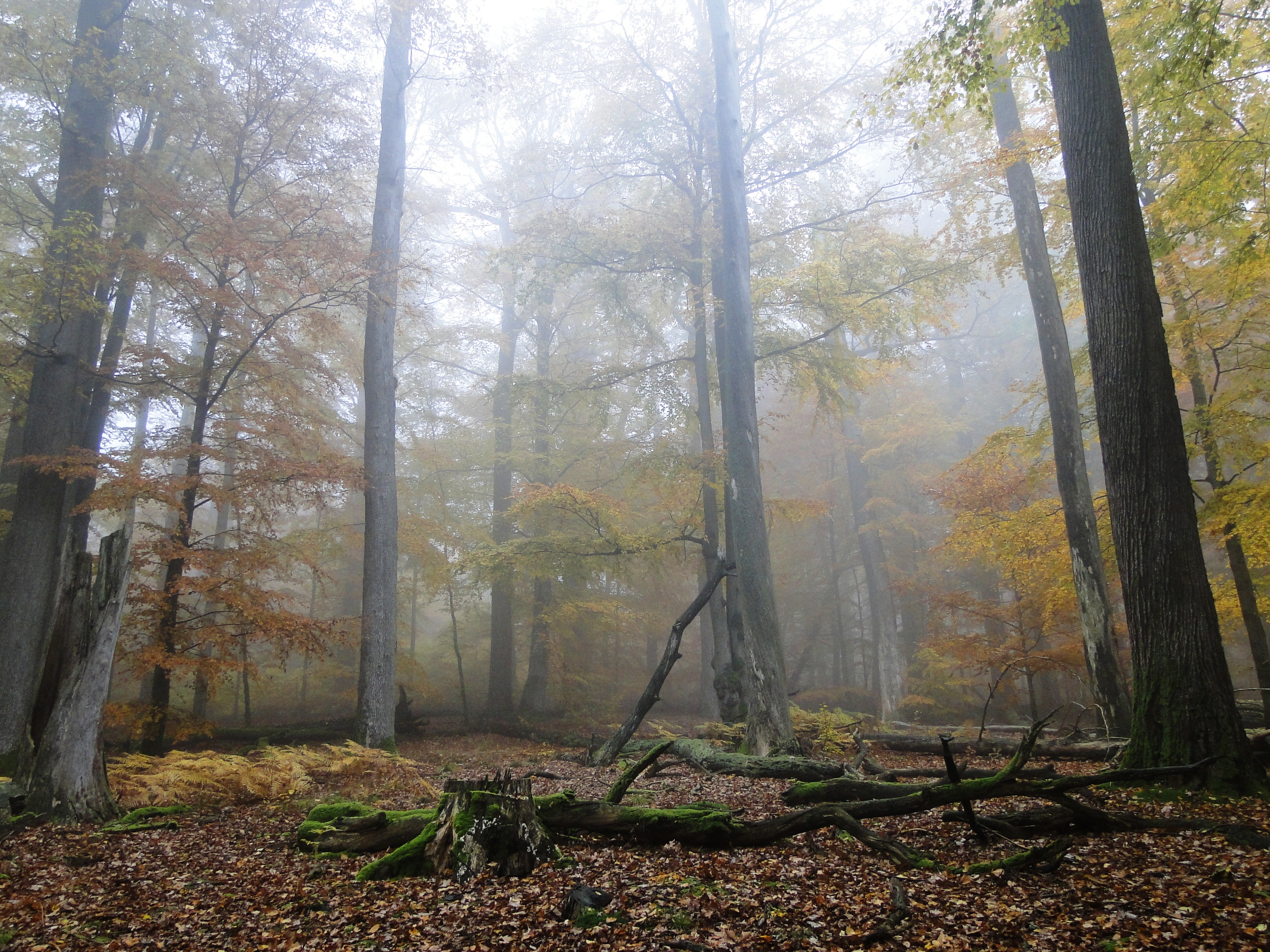
- Rohrberg nature reserve, site of some of the most ancient oaks and beeches in the Spessart

Highest point
- Peak: Geiersberg
- Elevation: 586 m (1,923 ft); NN
- Coordinates: 49°54′9″N 9°25′43″E

Dimensions
- Area: 2,440 km^{2} (940 mi^{2})

Geography
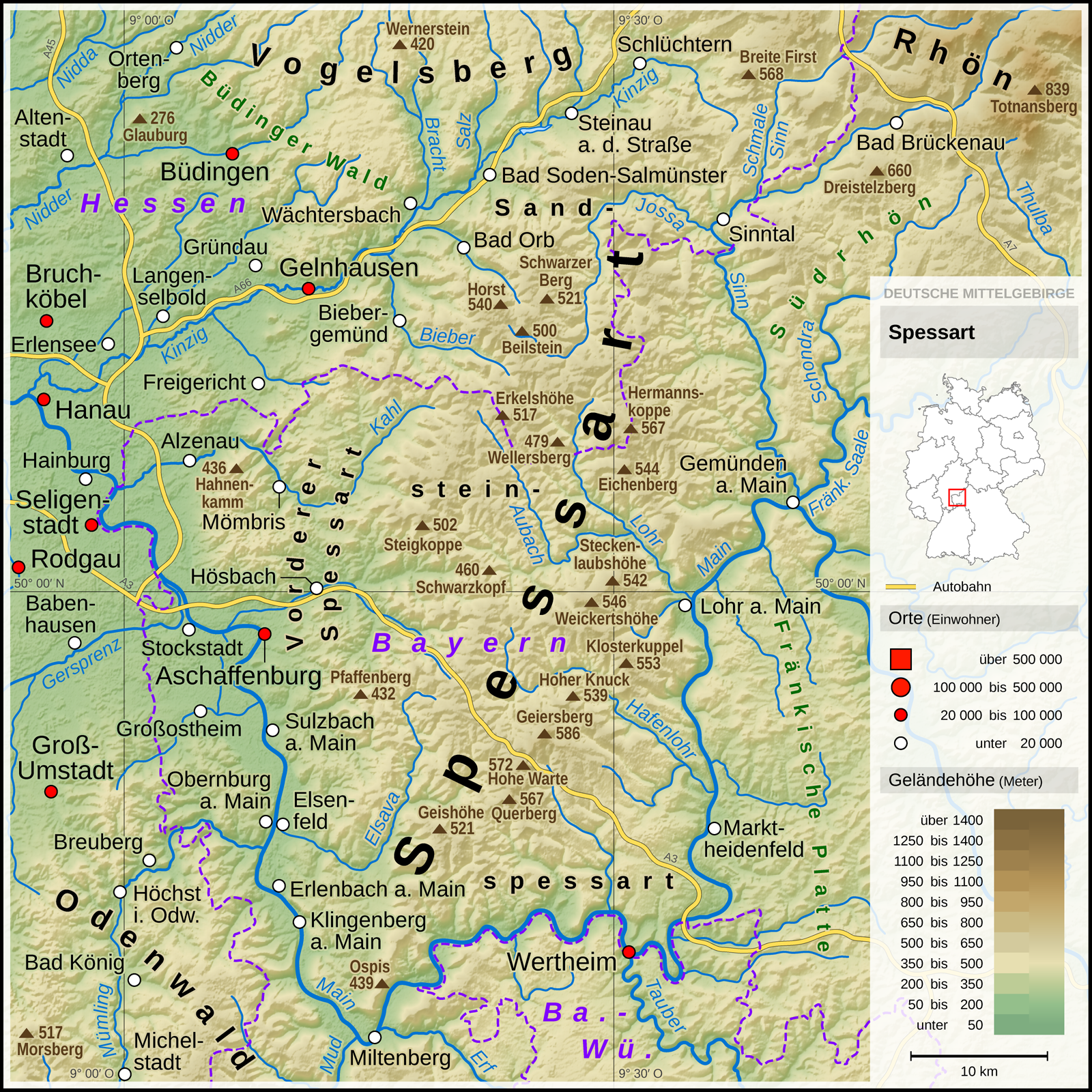
- Overview of the Spessart
- Country: Germany
- Region(s): Hesse, Bavaria

Spessart (German pronunciation: [ˈʃpɛsaʁt]) is a Mittelgebirge, a range of low wooded mountains, in the States of Bavaria and Hesse in Germany. It is bordered by the Vogelsberg, Rhön and Odenwald. The highest elevation is the Geiersberg at 586 metres above sea level.

== Etymology ==
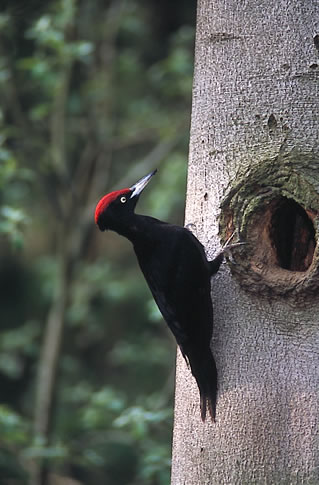
Spessart means "Woodpecker Forest"

The name is derived from "Spechtshardt". Specht is the German word for woodpecker and Hardt is an outdated word meaning "hilly forest".

== Geography ==
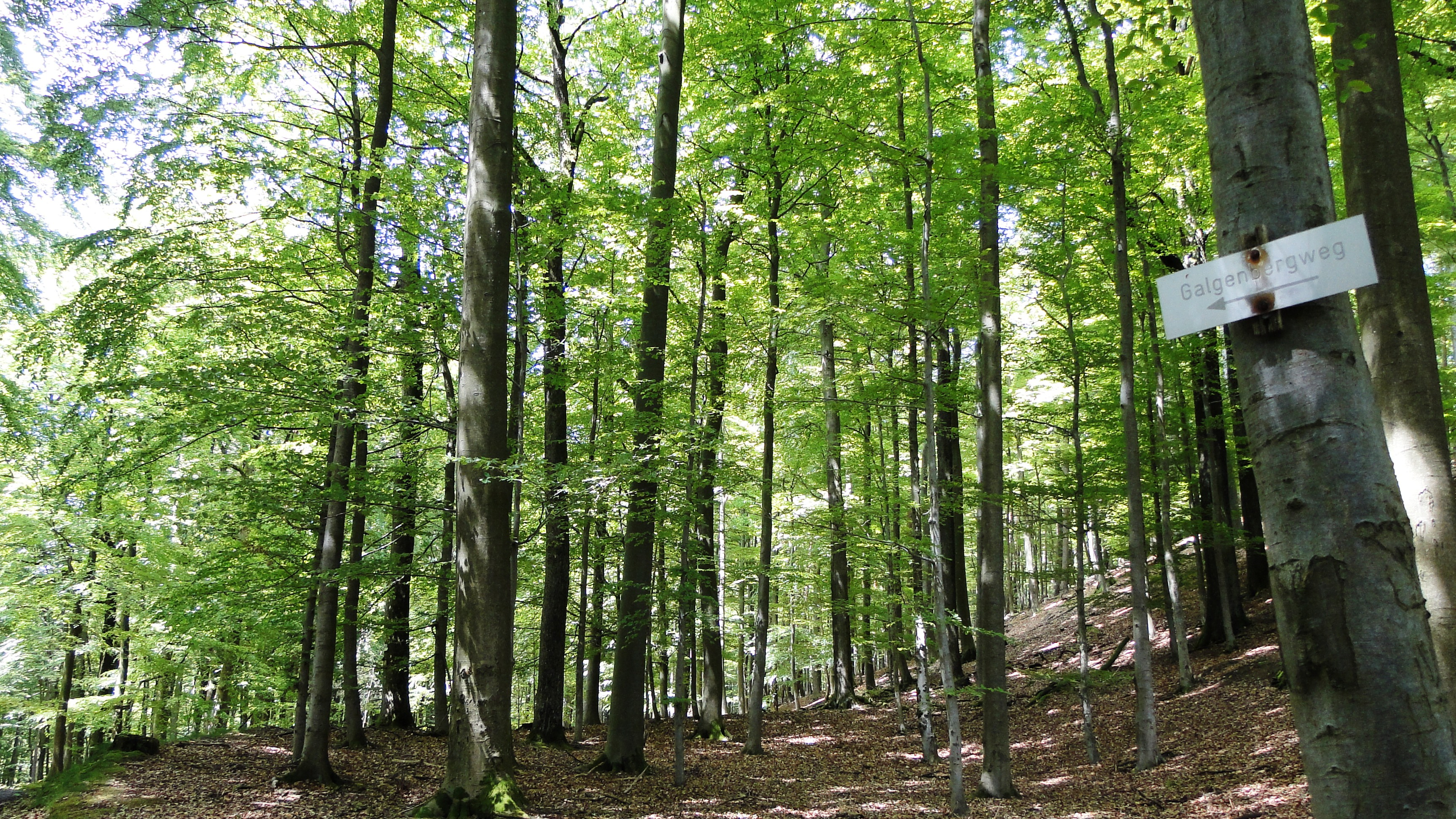
Beech forest on the Burgberg, Biebergemünd, Nordspessart

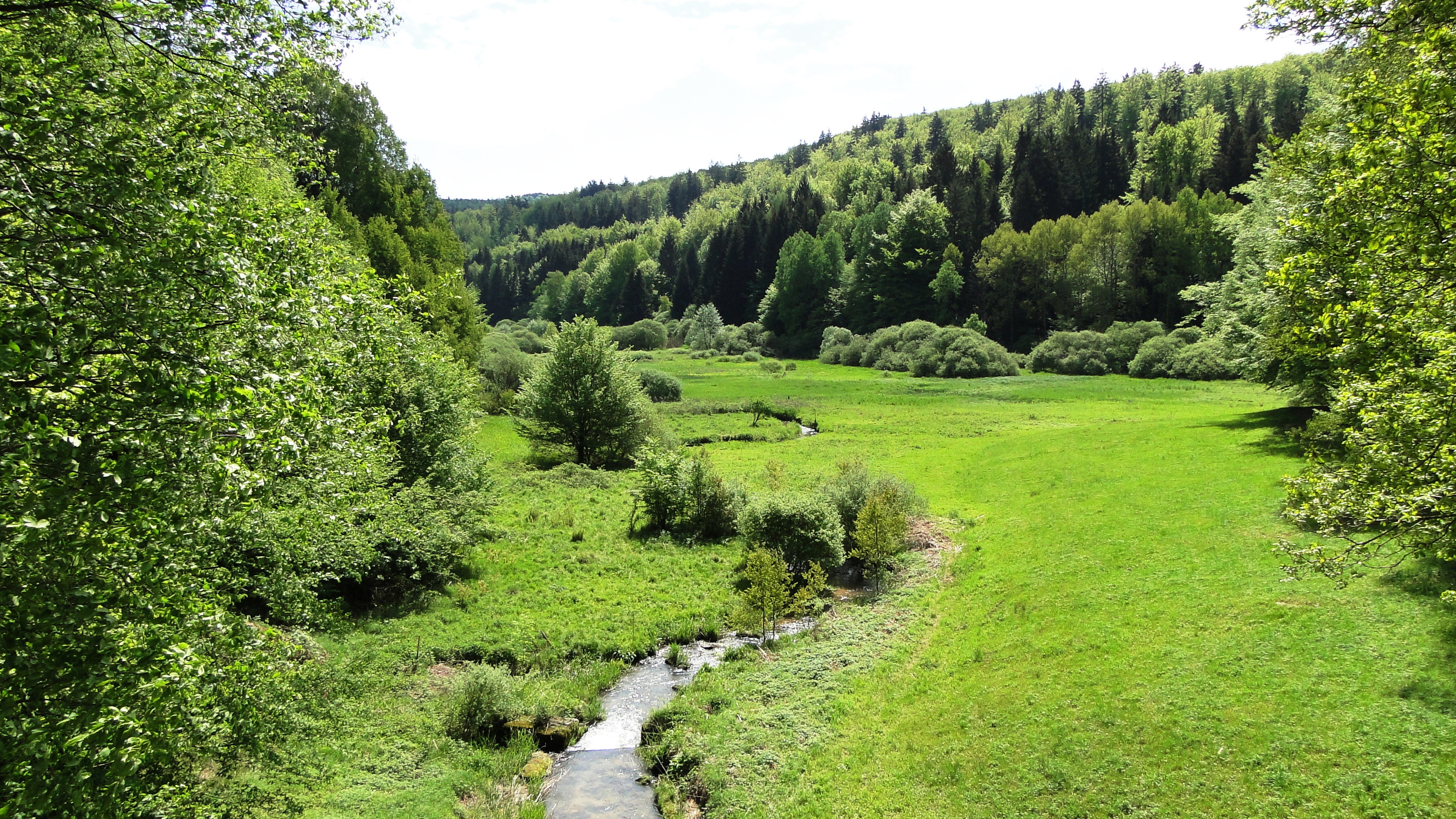
Hafenlohrtal, Hochspessart

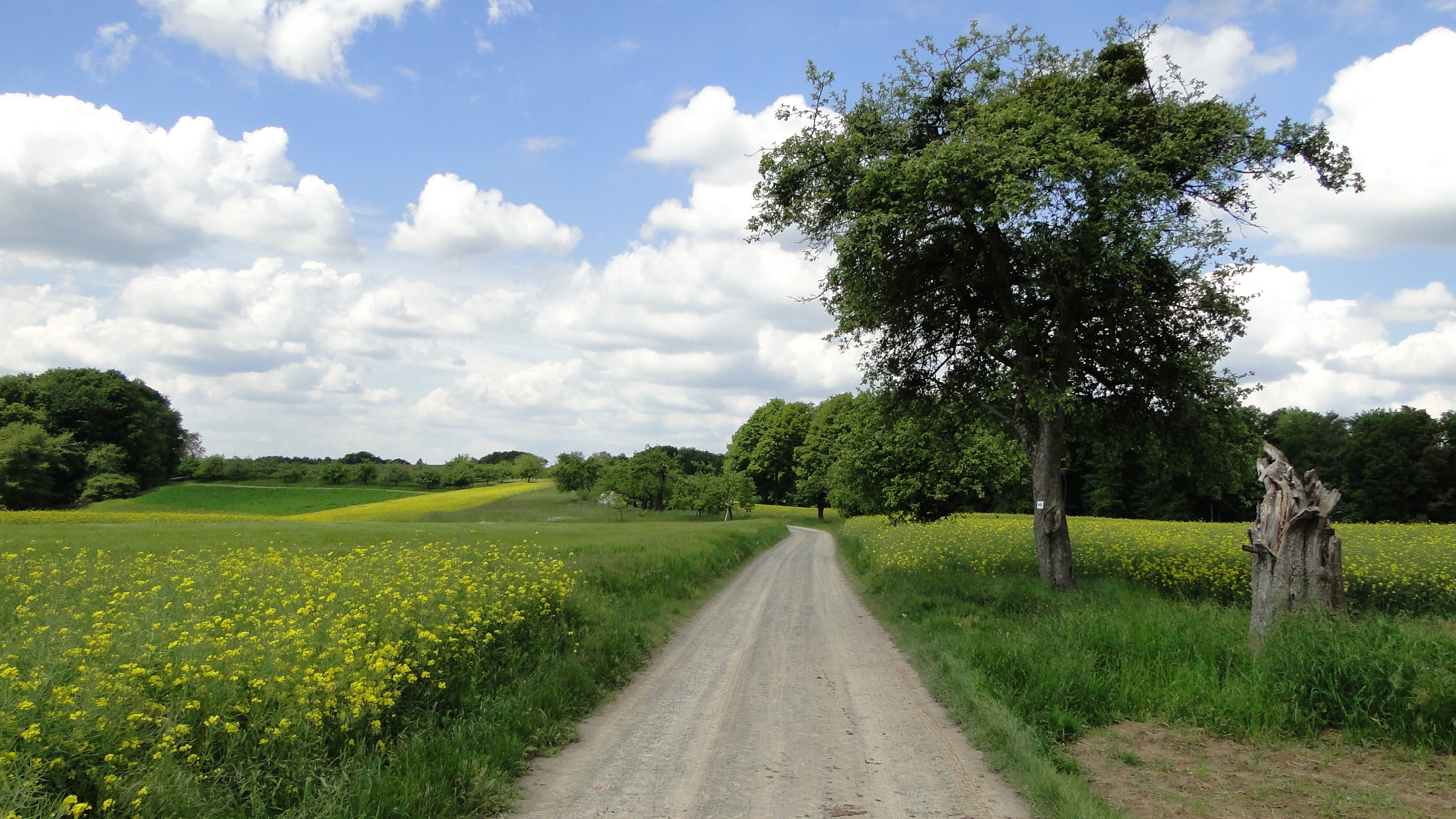
Fruit trees and rapeseed fields in the Vorspessart near Leidersbach

=== Location ===
The Spessart is a Mittelgebirge, part of the German Central Uplands, located in the Lower Franconia region of Bavaria and in Hesse, Germany. It is bordered by other ranges of hills: the Vogelsberg in the north, Rhön in the northeast and Odenwald in the southwest. Another way of describing the extent of the range is by naming the rivers that border it: the Main in the south and west, the Kinzig in the north and the Sinn in the northeast. The area of the Spessart totals around 2,440 square kilometres, of which 1,710 square kilometres are part of Bavaria.

The highest elevation is the Geiersberg at 586 metres above sea level. The highest elevation in the Hessian part of the Spessart is Hermannskoppe at 567 metres.

Since the admission of Croatia to the European Union (EU), the geographical centre of the EU is located in the village of Westerngrund, near Schöllkrippen, according to the Institut de Géographie in Paris. Previously, the centre was located west of Gelnhausen.

=== Divisions ===
There are a number of ways of dividing the Spessart into sub-regions. A popular approach is to divide it into Mainspessart, Vorspessart, Hochspessart and Nordspessart (or Kinzigtal). The western edge of the range between Aschaffenburg and Miltenberg is generally referred to as Vorspessart. However, some use that name also for the more northerly area between Aschaffenburg, Alzenau and Gelnhausen. It extends east to around Schöllkrippen and Mespelbrunn. The highest elevation here is the Hahnenkamm (460 metres). The Nordspessart is the stretch of hills to the south of the valley of the Kinzig, flowing from Schlüchtern to its mouth in the Main at Hanau. It also includes the valleys of small streams feeding the Kinzig from the south like the Bieber or Orb. There is some overlap with the northwestern part of the Vorspessart. The name Hochspessart is generally used for the central uplands of the range, stretching around 50 kilometres west to east and almost 100 kilometres north to south. The area contains around 70,000 hectares of forest, which was protected from logging during the Middle Ages due to its use as a hunting preserve. Finally, the region between Gemünden, Wertheim, Miltenberg and Klingenberg is known as Mainspessart.

The major natural regions making up the Spessart are known as Sandstein-Spessart and Vorspessart.

Parts of the Spessart lie within the Main-Kinzig district (Hesse) and the Bavarian districts Main-Spessart, Aschaffenburg (city), Landkreis Aschaffenburg and Miltenberg.

According to a strictly geological definition, a small region south of the Main near Wertheim and another south of Gemünden can be considered part of the Spessart. That definition would mean that part of the Spessart lies in the state of Baden-Württemberg.

The area within the triangle Würzburg-Wertheim-Gemünden is sometimes referred to as Würzburger Spessart.

== Geology ==
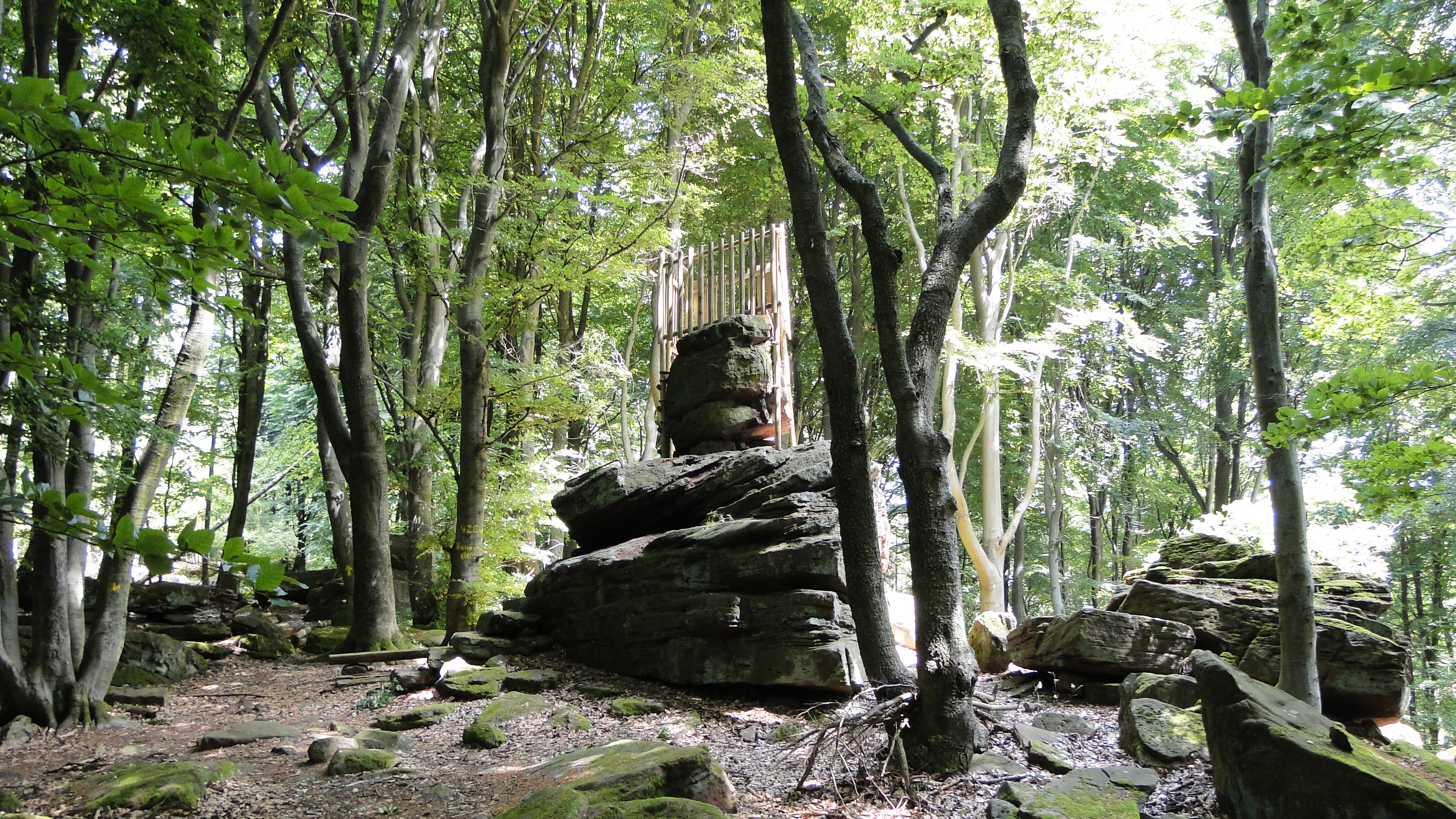
"Hunnenstein" (natural sandstone outcropping) with viewing platform, Mainspessart near Miltenberg

The lowest strata of the Spessart are made up of gneiss and mica schist, dating back around 1,200 million years. These rock types are most visible in the Vorspessart. On top of this is the Zechstein, dating to the Permian, found in a band stretching from Sailauf to Eidengesäß and as an "island" in the area of the stream Bieber near Biebergemünd, where it contained deposits of silver, copper, iron and cobalt.

The top layer of most of the Hochspessart and southern Spessart is made up of a slab of Buntsandstein or red sandstone, of up to 400 metres thickness. It dates back about 250 million years and is prevalent especially around Miltenberg. This is the best-known stone of the area, as it has been used in the past for many public buildings including the cathedrals of the Rhine valley, like Mainz Cathedral. On the western edge of the range there is also loess, a wind-deposited sediment.

The area of the Würzburger Spessart is made up of Muschelkalk, which provides better conditions for agriculture than the sandstone predominating in most of the Spessart proper. However, the north-south rift that follows the river Main along the western leg of the Maindreieck does not match exactly the geological divide between the sandstone and the Muschelkalk. For around 60 kilometres the rift parallels the Main from Gemünden to Triefenstein. The hills east of the river thus resemble those of the Spessart geologically.

== Climate and ecology ==
=== Climate ===
The climate of the area is temperate oceanic, featuring cool summers and relatively mild winters. In the Main valley, the average yearly temperature is around 8 to 9 degrees Celsius. In the central massif (Hochspessart) it is 6 to 7 degrees. The presence of extended woodlands results in high humidity and especially in the valleys there is often fog. The largest amount of precipitation falls in the elevated region of the Hochspessart, rising from the west to a maximum of 1,000 mm/year and then falling back on the lee side of the range (prevailing winds come from the west) to around 600 mm/year in the Main valley. Depending on the elevation, about 15% to 20% of the annual precipitation falls as snow. In the Hochspessart there are around 70 to 80 days of snow, in the Vorspessart and in the valleys of the Sinn and Hafenlohr around 40 to 50 days and around 30 days in the Main valley. A snow cover of 10 centimetres or more is relatively rare, prevailing on average on fewer than 10 days per year in the Main valley, 15 to 20 days in the Vorspessart and 30 to 35 days in the Hochspessart.

=== Naturparks ===
Old logo of the Naturpark.

A German nature park (Naturpark) is a protected area, a sort of nature preserve. The Spessart Nature Park covers the most heavily wooded Central Upland range in Germany. There are no cities or large towns inside the park; instead they lie around the forested region. The larger Bavarian part of the park was established in 1961 as the very first one within that state, the Hessian one followed in 1962.

The Bavarian Spessart Nature Park (Naturpark Bayerischer Spessart) measures 171,000 hectares in area and includes part of the southern Rhön (north of Gemünden and east of the Sinn river) and extends to the southern side of the Main river between Marktheidenfeld and Karlstadt. It features the largest continuous mixed forest in Germany. The Hessian Spessart Nature Park (Naturpark Hessischer Spessart) covers 72,900 hectares and is bordered in the north by the valley of the Kinzig.

For the current national park controversy, see below.

=== Flora and fauna ===
In the Vorspessart evergreens predominate, and meadows with scattered fruit trees (Streuobstwiesen) and whitethorn are common.

In the Hochspessart, around 85% of which is covered by forests, oaks and beeches are most numerous. The oldest trees are found in the nature preserves of Rohrberg (near Rohrbrunn) and Metzgergraben.

Like the Vorspessart, the Nordspessart also sports more evergreens, because the original tree cover there was largely gone by the 15th century as a result of the substantial fuel needs of the local glass foundry industry.

The Spessart provides a habitat for numerous species of animals. Deer, wild boars and foxes are quite common. There are also badgers, raccoons, European wildcats, Eurasian lynx and marten. The beaver, although hunted to extinction in the region, has been successfully re-established since the 1980s along several river valleys (Hafenlohr, Sinn).

Several species of woodpecker are found in the Spessart: black, great spotted, middle spotted, green and grey-faced.

== History ==
=== Prehistoric ===
The region has been inhabited since at least the Bronze Age, although settlement of the higher elevations was slow and initially the population was concentrated in the valleys. Bronze Age tumuli have been found north of Alzenau, near Geiselbach and Mömbris as well as near Pflaumheim, southwest of Aschaffenburg. Other tumuli were found near Kleinwallstadt, between Elsenfeld and Eichelsbach, near Klingenberg and on the Dürrenberg near Heimbuchenthal. The discovery of numerous prehistoric tools and weapons indicates that the Spessart was frequented by hunters, gatherers and fishers. These findings have been concentrated in the valley of the Kinzig, around Aschaffenburg, as well as in the valleys of the Bieber, the Lohr and the Sinn rivers. Near Goldbach, early Iron Age artifacts have been found, attributed to the Hallstatt culture. Hill forts attributed inter alia to Celts of the La Tène culture have been found on the Schanzenkopf near Wasserlos, on the Schloßberg near Soden/Sulzbach, on the Schanzkopf near Klingenberg and close to Miltenberg (Greinberg and Bürgstadter Berg, although the latter dates to the Urnfield period and/or even earlier Michelsberger culture). These fortified refuges or defended hill-top settlements were mostly built between 500 and 100 BC.

Since the Spessart proper was not part of the Roman territory, the Romans left traces only in the northwest of the region. The Limes met the Main river near Großkrotzenburg and the border then followed the river south all the way to Miltenberg. Large castra were located at Seligenstadt, Stockstadt am Main, Niedernberg, Obernburg, Wörth, Trennfurt (near Klingenberg) and near Miltenberg. The northern part of the Vorspessart was kept uninhabited by the Romans as a "no man's land" and buffer zone between their border and the local tribes.

As the Roman empire collapsed, the Burgundians came to the Main valley from the northeast in the late 3rd century. In the 5th century they were in turn ousted by the Allemanni, coming from the south. Aschaffenburg, Lohr and Gemünden were likely founded by them. The Alemanni were then absorbed by the Franks moving into the region from the Rhine. Graves dating to the 6th to 8th century were found near Obernburg, Mömlingen, Obernau and Aschaffenburg.

=== Medieval ===
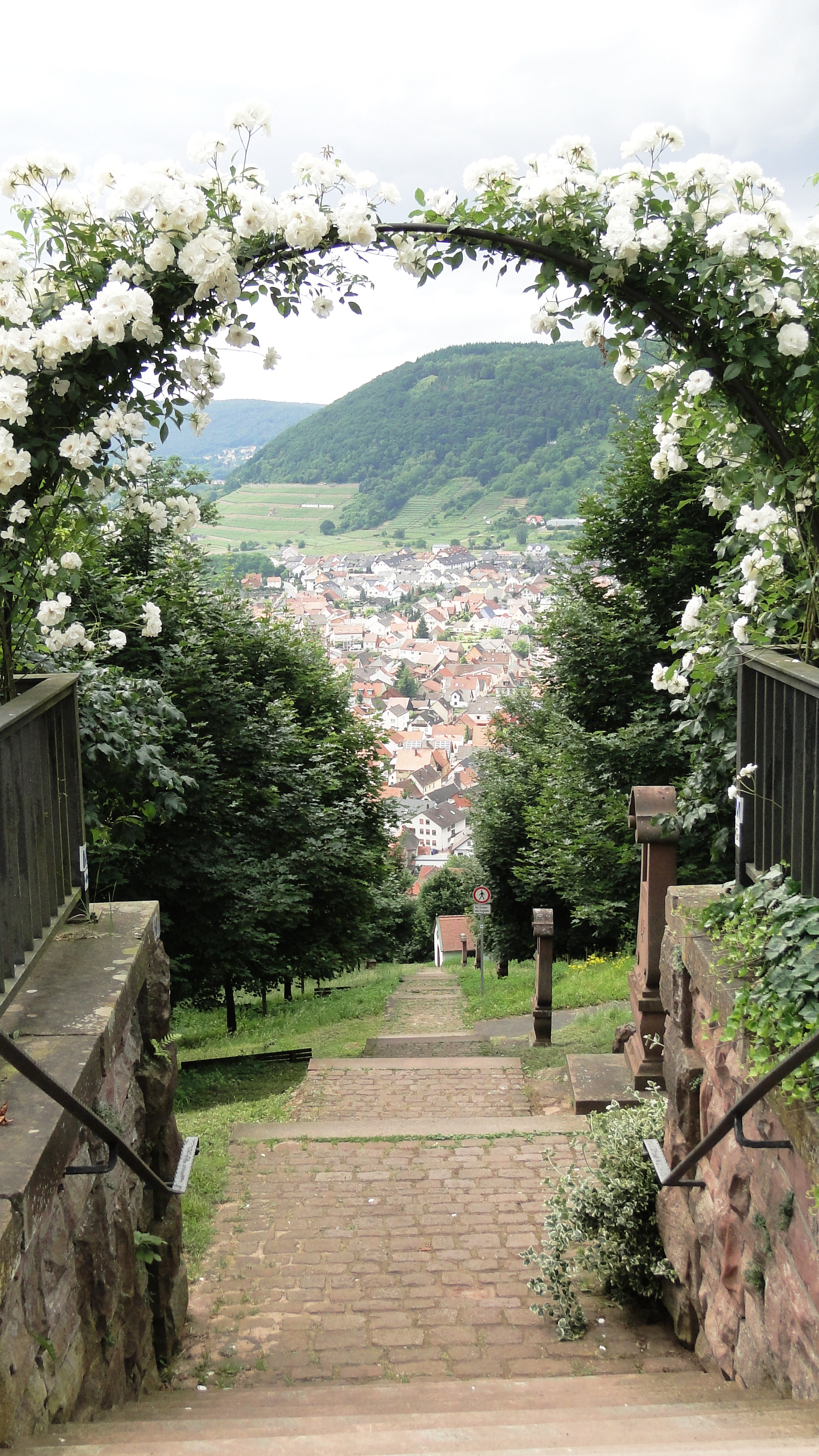
Engelsstaffeln: 612 steps connecting Kloster Engelberg with Großheubach

Under the Franks, the Spessart was used for hunting by freemen. During the reign of Charlemagne, the forests of the Spessart were a royal hunting preserve and thus off-limits to others. The uplands were only settled after abbeys/monasteries were established in the region. Besides the Benedictinians at Amorbach and Seligenstadt, the Benedictine abbey at Neustadt am Main was founded around 770. Kloster Neustadt received gifts of substantial woodlands from Charlemagne and was tasked by him with spreading Christianity in the region. Around the year 800, Charlemagne had Saxons settle in the Vorspessart.

Subsequent efforts to settle the uplands were made by the inhabitants of villages around the periphery like Klingenberg, Miltenberg, Kreuzwertheim, Lohr or Gemünden. From the valley of the Sinn, the Counts of Rieneck and the Knights of the Thüngen family (at Burgsinn) also attempted to expand into the Spessart. However, their efforts were hindered by their insular position, sandwiched between the substantial holdings of the great ecclesial powers of Fulda, Würzburg and Mainz. The latter acquired local influence not least via the Kollegiatsstift Aschaffenburg, which had been gifted much of the previous royal hunting preserve in 974 by Emperor Otto II. In 982, Otto I, Duke of Swabia and Bavaria died and left his regional territories to Mainz, which eventually turned Aschaffenburg into a second princely residence. Settlement efforts also originated from the Kinzig valley, in particular from the Kaiserpfalz at Gelnhausen (built under Emperor Friedrich Barbarossa in the 12th century). Abbeys also continued to expand into the forest. Apart from Kloster Neustadt, there was an Augustinian priory at Triefenstein (Kloster Triefenstein), founded in 1102.

Much of the medieval activity inside the Spessart centred on hunting by nobles, however, including notably the Prince-Electors/Archbishops of Mainz. Between the 12th and the 15th century several hunting lodges (Schöllkrippen, Wiesen, Rothenbuch, Bartelstein, Rohrbrunn) and moated castles (Burgsinn, Sommerau, Mespelbrunn) were constructed. To attract staff, the rulers provided land and cattle as well as forestry and fishing rights. In the 13th and 14th century, the Archbishops of Mainz expanded their influence and territory in the region. In the 14th century, they set up a system of local representatives (Forst- and Bachhuben) who were in charge of supervising hunting and forestry (Forsthuben) or fishing and organising the rafting of logs downriver (Bachhuben). These positions were mostly filled with lesser nobles who built fortified houses (e.g. at Oberaulenbach near Eschau and at Sommerau). In total there were 18 to 22 of these Huben (or Hufen, so called after an area of land that could be circuited on horseback in a given amount of time), located inter alia in Hösbach, Goldbach, Krausenbach, Obernau, Kleinostheim, Sailauf, Waldaschaff, Wintersbach and Heimbuchenthal. The commoners employed by the absentee feudal lords lived in villages that took the typical form of stretching along a single main street which followed the valleys of little streams (Streifendörfer, today still visible at Hessenthal, Mespelbrunn, Heimbuchenthal or Wintersbach). Settlers were granted a plot of land of around 100 metres width stretching from the road or stream in the middle of the valley up to the top of the ridges on either side of the valley. However, since the territory ruled by Mainz used an inheritance law that required the property to be split between all the sons of the deceased, the size of the holdings soon began to dwindle and often became too small to support families.

The Counts of Rieneck, originally vogts in the service of the Archbishops of Mainz, later became their rivals in the struggle for the Spessart's resources. Until the family died out in 1543, the rivalry between Mainz and Rieneck dominated the area's history.

Although sparsely populated in the Middle Ages, the Spessart at the time was crossed by two important trading routes. One, known as the Eselsweg ("donkey path") was used to transport salt (on the back of donkeys) from what is today Bad Orb to the Main near Großheubach where it was loaded on ships. The other, the Birkenhainer Strasse, connected Hanau in the west to Gemünden in the east, cutting across the wide loop of the Main known as Mainviereck. This route seems to have been in use as early as Neolithic times and was heavily frequented. The name probably derived from a grove of birch trees near Geiselbach.

A major regional industry in medieval and early modern times were glass foundries that made use of the abundant local supply of firewood (e.g. at Wiesthal, Weibersbrunn, Neuhütten, Heigenbrücken, Einsiedel and Heinrichsthal). Glass production then required an annual amount of wood roughly translating to 20 to 30 hectares of forest per foundry. By the early 15th century, the four foundries located in the territory controlled by Mainz produced around 230,000 pieces of blown glass and 3,000 zentner of flat glass each year. Most of these enterprises were discontinued by the 18th and 19th century, however, having become uneconomical.

=== Modern ===
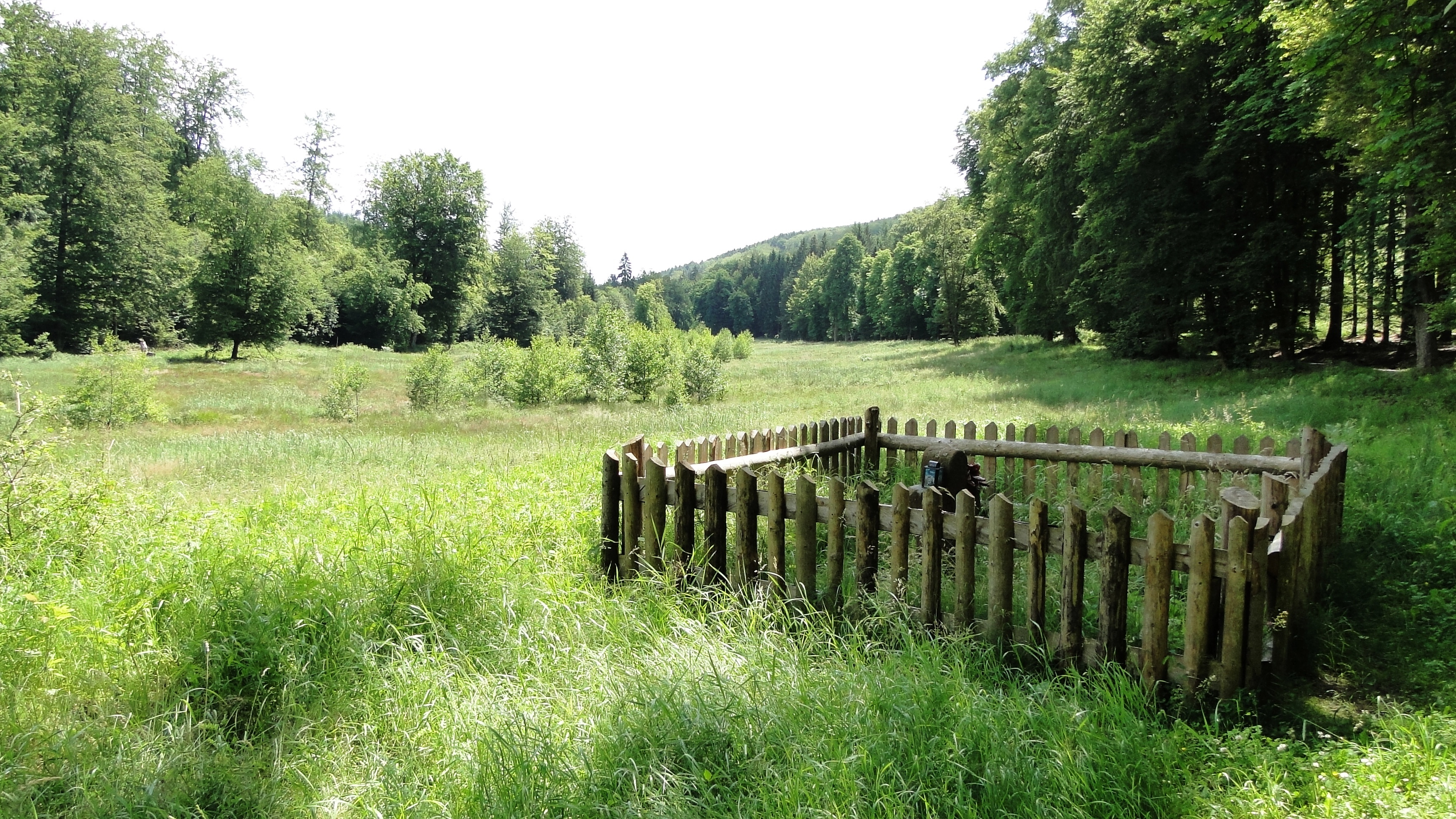
Memorial cross for the "arch-poacher" Johann Adam Hasenstab (1716-1773) near Schollbrunn

Low soil quality and decreasing plot size made life hard for farmers in the higher elevations of the Spessart. Conditions became worse with the destruction and diseases brought by wars like the Bauernkrieg in 1525, the Schmalkaldsche Krieg of 1546/47 and then the Thirty Years' War in 1618-48. In the wake of the chaos of the Thirty Years' War, bands of brigands began to operate in the Spessart (Spessarträuber). Due to the area's low density of population, important trade routes passing through lonely forest territory and the Spessart's extremely fragmented political situation (there were at times 17 separate jurisdictions), banditry was a lucrative business. Although merchant "caravans" of up to 70 wagons banded together for mutual protection, bands of brigands repeatedly succeeded in spectacular raids that made them the terror of the region. Bandit activity again peaked in the early 19th century (1803–11), during the Napoleonic Wars and following the fall of the Holy Roman Empire. It was only after the end of the political fragmentation in the region that law and order were restored. The last Spessarträuber were executed at Heidelberg in 1812.

After the 17th century, Eisenhammer ("iron hammers") were set up, using water power to create wrought iron. These early industrial establishments were at Laufach, Waldaschaff, Schafsteg, Höllhammer, Lichtenau and Wintersbach. The last of these still in operation is in the Haslochtal.

The French invasion during the War of the First Coalition again brought war to the Spessart in 1796. In 1803, the ecclesial princedoms were abolished in the Secularization. The northern part of the Spessart, part of the Grafschaft Hanau, became part of Kurhessen, with the exception of Alzenau. After the Congress of Vienna of 1814/15, the former territories of Mainz and Würzburg became part of the Kingdom of Bavaria. In 1866, the Kurfürstentum Hessen and with it the northern Spessart became Prussian. In 1854 the railway between Würzburg and Aschaffenburg was opened, replacing the post route in use since 1615 as the main thoroughfare through the hills.

In World War II, Aschaffenburg was severely hit by Allied air raids and further damaged by a siege.

In the 1950s the Spessart section of the Bundesautobahn 3 (or A3) was built, linking Würzburg and Aschaffenburg.

== Culture and tourism ==
=== Legends & Fairytales ===
The Spessart is widely known for its legends, ghost stories and fairytales. The most important historical account of the legendary Johann Georg Faust, namesake of the proverbial Faustian Bargain, was when he came to the small Spessart town of Gelnhausen in 1506. The Grimm brothers spent their youth in the 1790s at nearby Steinau on the river Kinzig. Although they compiled Grimms' Fairy Tales, their world-famous collection of fairy tales, only in 1812 and after having moved to Kassel, regional legends from their childhood did feature in that collection. Thus, the tale of Snow White may have originated in the Spessart heartlands, with the town of Lohr pushing forward a substantial case for being the home and inspiration for the main characters and elements like the magic mirror. Along that line of interpretation, the seven dwarfs appearing in the story are actually based on stunted miners from the Bieber region. Also the use of children for mining in very tight crawlspaces and the unhealthy working conditions often caused medieval and early modern miners to be stunted or otherwise deformed. Local glass production could have been the inspiration for the glass coffin featured in the fairy tale.

Other popular characters from German folklore also appear prominently in legends from the region. In stark contrast to the Grimm brothers' version, the more rural, precarious lives of Spessart folks made Mother Hulda, generally a regular staple in middle German tales, a much more brutal and unfathomable figure, at times even resorting to killing people. A similar female appearance is the Aaleborgfraale (regional dialect for "Altenburg lady"), who is especially feared and revered by locals. The most popular story is about her guarding a buried treasure chest in legendary "Altenburg" castle, that can only be retrieved by being absolutely silent during the process. If one fails to do so, by opening the wooden crate, he or she will not find treasures, but will face the harrowing image of the Aaleborgfraale stepping out of the crate. As with Mother Hulda, the character is said to go back to pre-Christian times in the Bronze Age.

Many of the lesser-known Spessart tales that were passed down till today have been collected by local teacher and ethnologist Valentin Pfeiffer (1886–1964). His book Spessart-Sagen ("Spessart legends") has been reprinted 17 times.

=== Literature & Film ===
The Spessart is the point for departure for the protagonist of what is widely regarded as the first major German novel, Simplicius Simplicissimus, written in 1668 by Hans Jakob Christoffel von Grimmelshausen, and vividly depicting the social consequences of the Thirty Years' War. Probably even more important in shaping public perceptions of the region has been Wilhelm Hauff's novella Das Wirtshaus im Spessart ("The Spessart Inn"). It features a frame story involving a romantic tale of the Spessarträuber. Director Kurt Hoffmann turned Hauff's novella into a very successful film in 1957. It starred Liselotte Pulver and was shot on location at Mespelbrunn Castle and Miltenberg. The film The Spessart Inn spawned two sequels The Haunted Castle (1960) and Glorious Times at the Spessart Inn (1967).

=== Spas ===
The Spessart features one officially recognised spa town, Bad Orb, as well as a number of climatic spas (Luftkurorte), like Heigenbrücken, where visitors benefit from the high air quality.

=== Places of interest ===
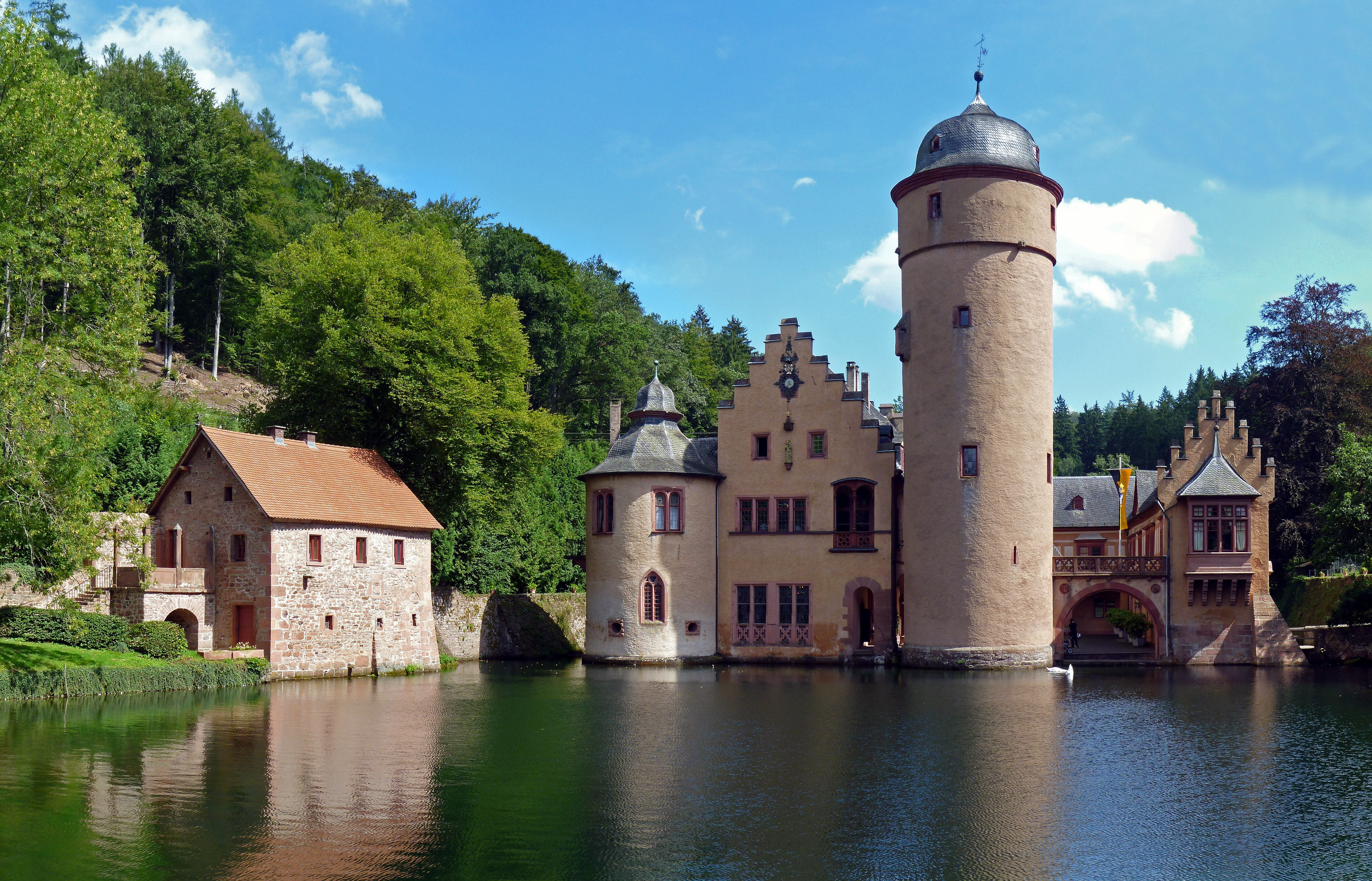
Schloss Mespelbrunn, emblematic landmark of the Spessart

- Mespelbrunn Castle - emblematic Spessart castle
- Franziskanerkloster Engelberg - Franciscan abbey overlooking Großheubach
- Miltenberg - medieval town centre
- Wertheim - medieval town centre and castle

=== Hiking ===
Hiking has long been a major tourist attraction in the Spessart. Two notable long-distance trails follow the historic routes of the Birkenhainer Strasse and the Eselsweg, but there are several others like the Schneewittchen-Wanderweg ("Snow White Trail") from Lohr to Bieber or the Fränkischer Rotwein-Wanderweg ("Franconian Red Wine Trail"). There is an extensive network of signposted hiking trails in the Spessart. In a recent update of the signposts, 4,300 kilometres of trails were upgraded in the Bavarian Spessart alone. The Spessartbund, in charge of most of the major trails, was founded back in 1913, although its roots go back to the 19th century. Local municipalities have also created shorter trails. More recently, Nordic walking and bike trails have been added.

=== Nationalpark controversy ===
In July 2016, Bavarian minister president Horst Seehofer announced his intention to create a third national park in the state, after Bavarian Forest National Park and Berchtesgaden National Park. The potential candidates were the Bavarian Rhön, the Donau-Auen and the Spessart. According to the Bavarian minister for the environment, Ulrike Scharf, in the Spessart around 10,900 hectares of forest (or around 10% of the Bavarian Spessart's wooded area) would be turned into a national park, which would put strict limits on the commercial use of the area. The rest of the forest would be unaffected. All of the land area would be state-owned, no private land would be included.

However, a controversy soon erupted about the plan. Critics argued that they would lose the right to access water sources on public land, that the zones of strict environmental protection would result in the uncontrolled spread of pests such as the Bark beetle or of wild boars and wolves. In addition, many local property owners currently enjoy rights, sometimes dating back to the Middle Ages, to harvest wood in state-owned forests. This sideline in forestry business has long been a source of fuel, timber and income for many.

CSU Member of the Landtag Peter Winter founded the association Wir im Spessart to oppose the plan. In a short time he was able to collect over 7,000 signatures against the national park. Local farmer associations and hunting groups joined the cause. Residents have protested against the plan by posting signs, attending demonstrations and organizing local referendums.

Support for the plan came from environmentalists, as well as from many forestry workers, who argued that many of the concerns advanced by the critics were misplaced or exaggerated.

The protests by local property owners/residents against the plan were ultimately successful. In July 2017, the Bavarian state government officially announced that plans for a national park in the Spessart would not be pursued further. The reason given was that no private property rights should be infringed in creating a national park.

== Economy ==
=== Transportation ===
The Intercity-Express (ICE) route from Frankfurt to Würzburg crosses the Spessart west to east from Aschaffenburg to Lohr. This route is also known as the Main-Spessart-Bahn. There has been recent modernization on this route, with the old Spessart ramp and the Schwarzkopf Tunnel being replaced with a series of new tunnels between Laufach and Heigenbrücken. The ICE route from Fulda to Würzburg runs down the Sinn valley and joins the Frankfurt track south of Gemünden. A lesser train route (Maintalbahn) follows the Main river from Aschaffenburg to Wertheim via Miltenberg.

The Bundesautobahn 3 (or A3), a major west-east route, crosses the Spessart between Aschaffenburg and a point to the northeast of Wertheim. The other major roads are the Bundesstrassen 26 (Aschaffenburg-Lohr) and 276 (Wächtersbach-Lohr). In the Spessart, the B8 today follows the route of the A3.

=== Agriculture/forestry ===
Sandstone provides poor conditions for cattle raising or farming. As a consequence, these activities are concentrated in the loess-covered areas in the west and around Marktheidenfeld. However, wine growing and fruit orchards have proved more successful in the west and northwest (Kahlgrund, Obernburg, Klingenberg, Großheubach) and on the southern edge of the Mainspessart. The vineyards around Kahl are Bavaria's most northerly wine growing region. The Muschelkalk makes the Würzburger Spessart somewhat better suited for agriculture. Wheat as well as wine thrive there and in the area around Homburg (now part of Triefenstein) grow some of the best-known appellations of the Mainfranken region.

The main asset of the Spessart region remain its forests. Besides attracting tourists to the area, there are substantial forestry businesses, for example at Burgsinn and the Fürstlich Löwensteinscher Park, a privately owned woodland. The forests of the Spessart are known for the quality of their wood. The brown "Spessart Oak", in particular, is renowned for its tight, straight grain; it is used for fine furniture, millwork, and flooring. The forests also provide game/hunting, wild berries and mushrooms. However, shipbuilding which used to be a major industry in some towns along the Main, lost its local importance with the advent of ships built from metal rather than wood. One shipyard is still active at Erlenbach am Main.

=== Mining ===
Mining was never an important activity in the Spessart. Copper mining near Schöllkrippen (Sommerkahl) has long been discontinued as has the strip mining of lignite in the Nordspessart near Kahl. Mining used to be important in the area around Biebergemünd, but ceased in the 1920s.

Quarrying of sandstone, a major industry in medieval and early modern times concentrated on Miltenberg, Fechenbach and Reistenhausen, has largely been ended.
