= Blankenbach =

- Municipality
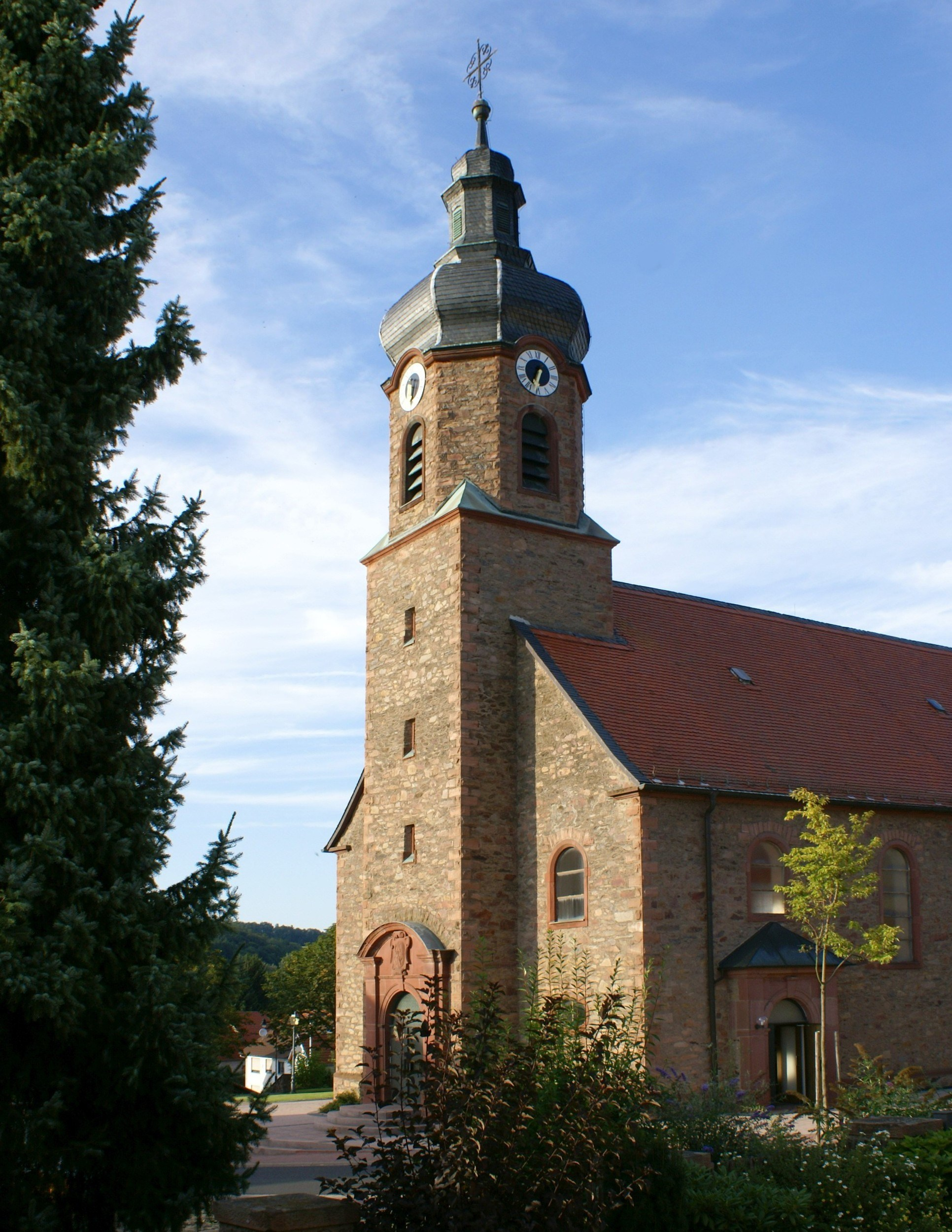
- Church of Saints Kylian and Boniface in Blankenbach

- Coat of arms

- Location of Blankenbach within Aschaffenburg district
- Interactive map of Blankenbach
- Location within Germany Location within Bavaria
- Coordinates: 50°4′N 9°14′E
- Country: Germany
- State: Bavaria
- Admin. region: Unterfranken
- District: Aschaffenburg
- Municipal assoc.: Schöllkrippen
- Subdivisions: 2 Ortsteile

Government
  - Mayor (2020–26): Matthias Müller (CSU)

Area
  - Total: 3.95 km^{2} (1.53 sq mi)
- Elevation: 190 m (620 ft)

Population (2025-12-31)
  - Total: 1,466
  - Density: 371/km^{2} (961/sq mi)
- Time zone: UTC+01:00 (CET)
  - Summer (DST): UTC+02:00 (CEST)
- Postal codes: 63825
- Dialling codes: 06024
- Vehicle registration: AB
- Website: www.gemeinde-blankenbach.de

Blankenbach is a municipality in the Aschaffenburg district in the Regierungsbezirk of Lower Franconia (Unterfranken) in Bavaria, Germany, and a member of the Verwaltungsgemeinschaft (Administrative community) of Schöllkrippen.

== Geography ==
=== Location ===
Gemeindeteile

The municipality lies some 17 km from Aschaffenburg and Alzenau. Together with the municipalities of Kleinkahl, Krombach, Schöllkrippen, Sommerkahl, Westerngrund and Wiesen, Blankenbach forms the Verwaltungsgemeinschaft (Administrative municipality) of Schöllkrippen in the Kahlgrund.

== History ==
=== Amalgamations ===
In 1966, the two municipalities of Großblankenbach and Kleinblankenbach, which lay on the Kahl's right and left banks respectively, merged into the municipality of Blankenbach. While Großblankenbach had formerly belonged to the Counts of Schönborn, Kleinblankenbach had been an Electoral Mainz holding.

== Politics ==
=== Municipal council ===
The council is made up of 12 council members, not counting the mayor.

	CSU	SDP	FWG	Total
2008	5	4	3	12 seats

(as at municipal election held on 2 March 2008)

=== Coat of arms ===
The municipality's arms might be described thus: Gules a bar wavy argent, in chief a wheel spoked of six of the second, in base a lion passant queue fourchée Or standing on an abased partition per fess dancetty of three below which argent.

The municipality of Blankenbach came into being in 1966 through the merger of the formerly self-administering municipalities of Großblankenbach and Kleinblankenbach. The Kahl split these two municipalities, as symbolized by the wavy bar in the arms. Until the 19th century, the river formed the border between two lordly entities, with Großblankenbach being ruled by the Counts of Schönborn. This is shown in the arms by the lion, taken from the arms once borne by the Schönborn family, who governed the municipality for the Archbishopric of Würzburg, symbolized in the arms by the dancetty (that is, zigzag) partition in the base of the escutcheon, based on a similar partition in the arms borne by the bishops, and known as the “Franconian rake”. The six-spoked wheel (the Wheel of Mainz) refers to Electoral Mainz's lordship over Kleinblankenbach.

The arms have been borne since 1967.

== Culture ==
=== Culinary specialities ===
Wine pressers in the municipality and Apfelwein from Blankenbach are known well beyond the Kahlgrund and hold a long tradition.

On August 26, 1981 after singing the Angelus, the Pro Música Wind Ensemble of Blankenbach, a 40-piece ensemble, performed to Pope John Paul who then, using several languages, addressed the crowd.

== Economy and infrastructure ==
For the lime kiln that was built after 1900 on the Kahlgrundbahn railway line, the raw material was brought by a cableway from the limestone pits at Sommerkahl and Eichenberg.
