= Salsaringer =

German music group

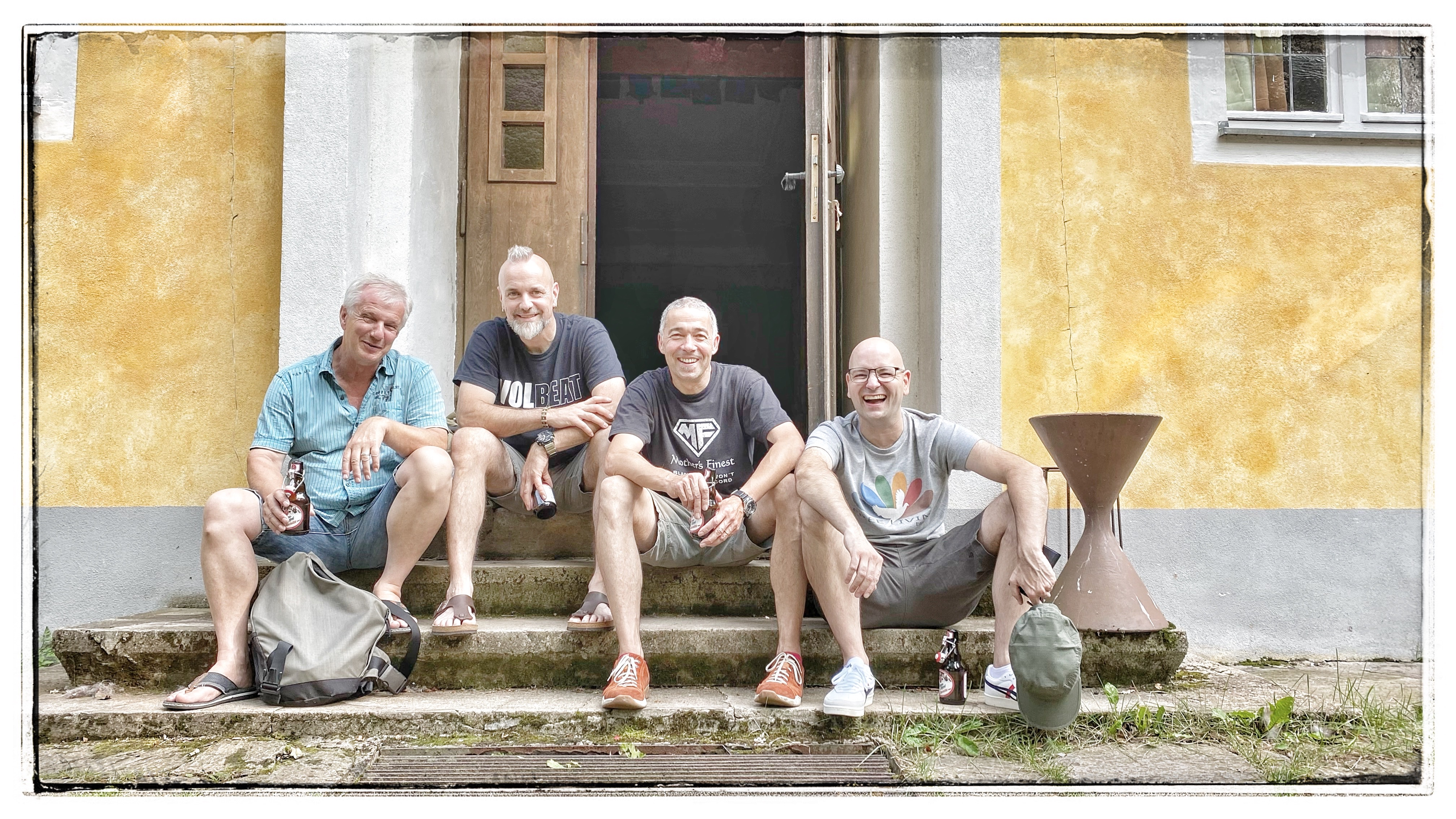
- Salsaringer during a rehearsal weekend in Reuschberg, July 2021

Background information
- Origin: Kahlgrund
- Genres: Rock, Latin, Jazz, Folklore, Dialect
- Members: Timo Wiesmann (Schweinheim), vocals; Josef Bayer (Schöllkrippen), guitar, vocals; Martin Brückner (Geiselbach), bass guitar, backing vocals; Helmut Dedio (Omersbach), drums, percussion
- Website: salsaringer.de

Salsaringer is a Lower Franconian dialect-band.

== Band and genre ==
Salsaringer is a Kahlgrund-based band, which represents self written music and song texts from the Kahlgrund featuringTimo Wiesmann (Schweinheim) as the singer, Martin Brückner (Geiselbach) as the bass player, Josef Bayer (Schöllkrippen) as the guitar player and Helmut Dedio (Omersbach) as the drummer. They play Rock, Latin, Jazz, and Folk using the local dialect.

== Songs ==
The band has a wide variety of songs and topics, mostly taken from regular village life, such as: Oscar, the ganter, waking up by aeroplanes, tractors and chain saws; gamblers in Les Vagos; gardeners, who change completely in spring; and what happens if you ask Renate O. in Mömbris-Dörnsteinbach for directions to Omersbach.
