= Reuschberg (Spessart) =

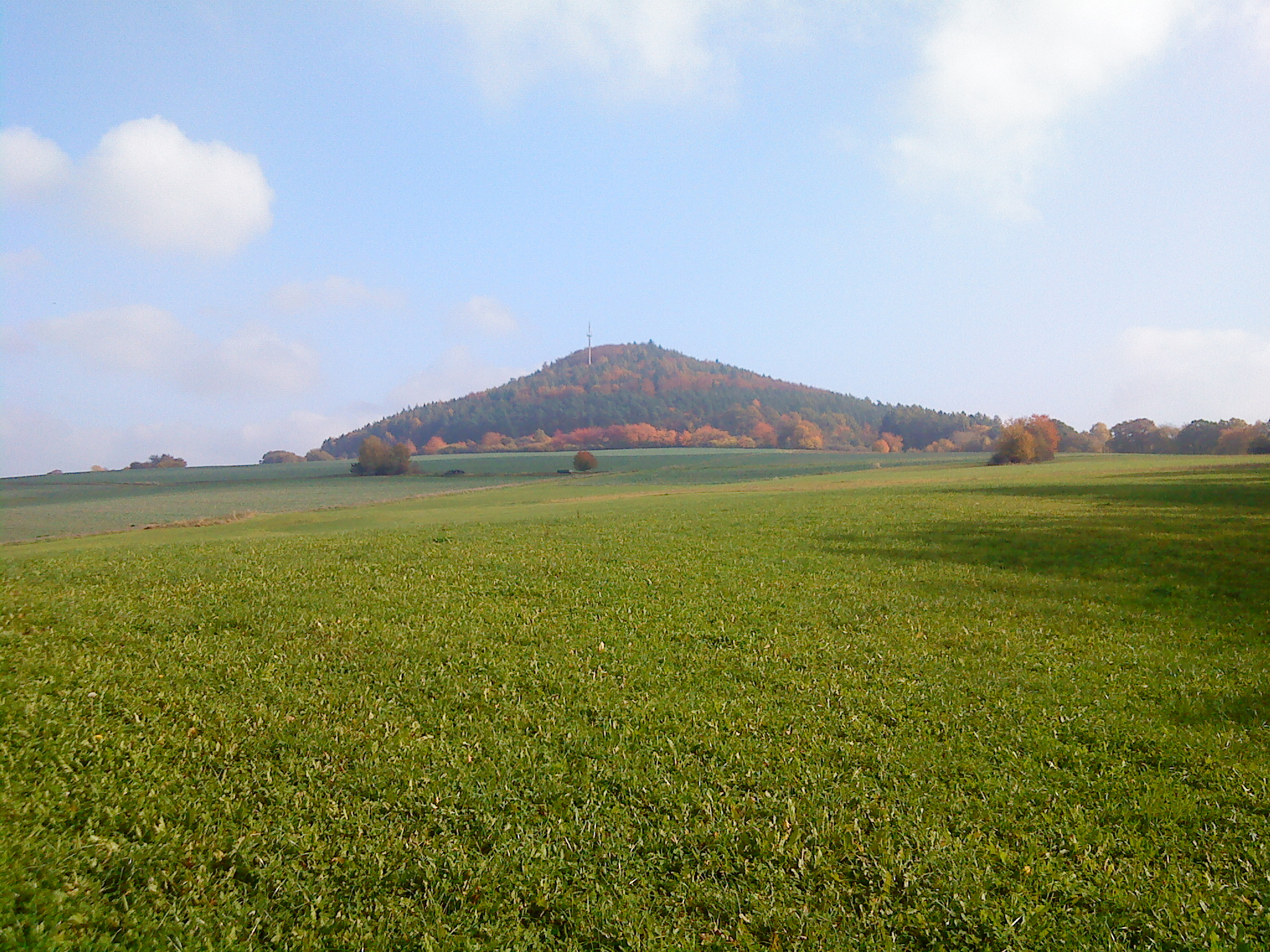
- View from Schöllkrippen

Highest point
- Elevation: 415 m (1,362 ft)
- Coordinates: 50°05′19″N 9°16′11″E

Geography
- Location within Germany
- Location: Bavaria, Germany
- Parent range: Spessart

Reuschberg (Spessart) is a hill in the Spessart range, located in the Landkreis Aschaffenburg, part of the Franconia region of Bavaria, Germany. It has an elevation of 415 metres.

The wooded hill is located mostly in the unincorporated area of Schöllkrippener Forst. At its foot lies the town of Schöllkrippen. To the south is the valley of the Höllenbach, to the north that of the Kleiner Laudenbach, both of which flow into the Kahl.

There is a transmission mast on the hill, operated by Vodafone, located on the slope at an elevation of around 385 metres.

Near the hilltop, there is a circular rampart, known as Alte Burg or Altenburg, with remains of both earth and masonry walls, long thought to date to the La Tène period. However, excavations in 2005 indicate that it most likely is a 10th-century refuge castle, with some elements added in the 11th or 12th century. Over the centuries, locals have used the fortification as a source of construction materials, reducing the remains to just foundations.

The Hof Reuschberg, a former monastery, lies on the lower slopes, just beneath the forest fringe.
