= Schöllkrippen =

- Municipality
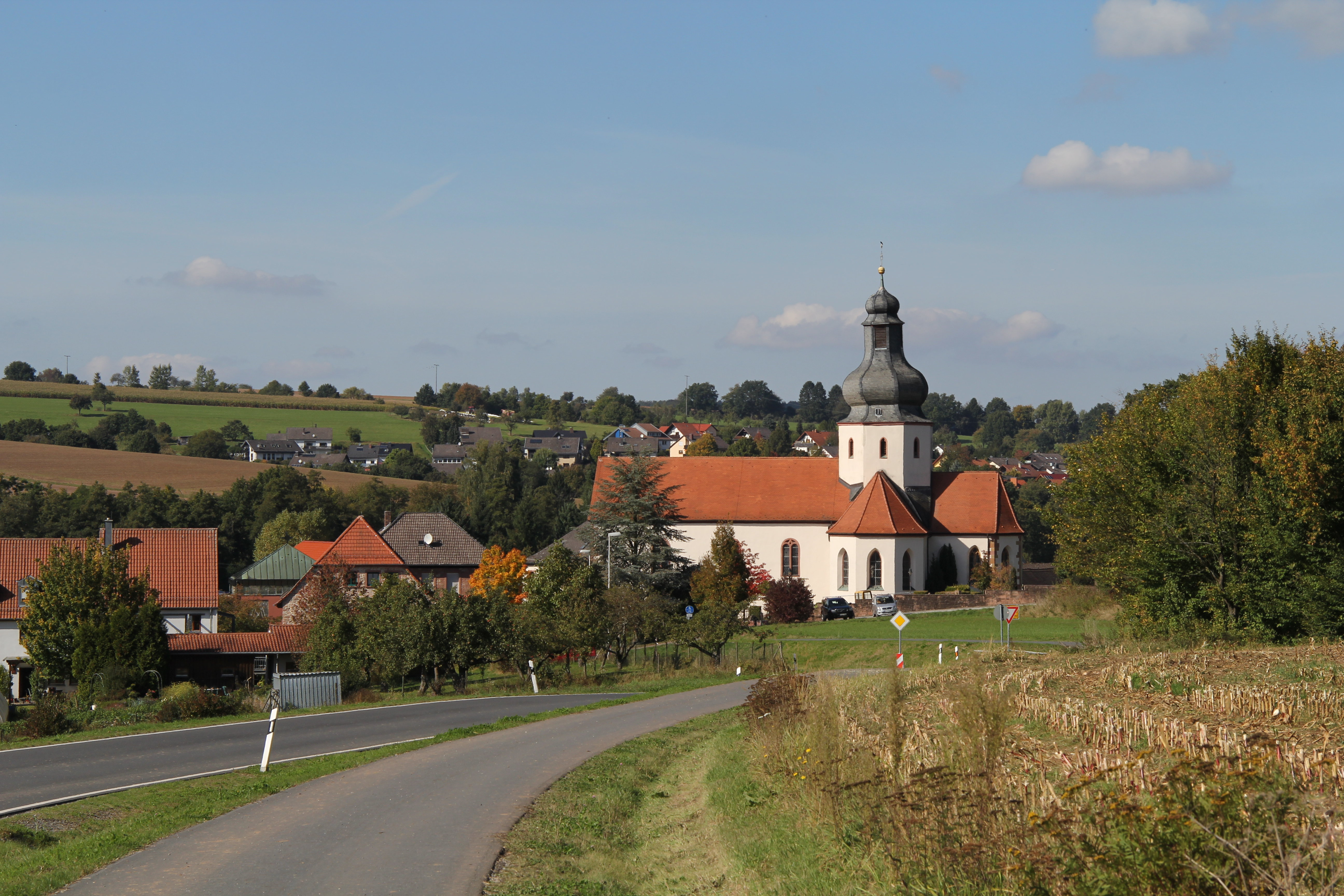
- Country road to Schöllkrippen, with the church St Katharina

- Coat of arms

- Location of Schöllkrippen within Aschaffenburg district
- Interactive map of Schöllkrippen
- Location within Germany Location within Bavaria
- Coordinates: 50°05′07″N 09°14′45″E
- Country: Germany
- State: Bavaria
- Admin. region: Unterfranken
- District: Aschaffenburg
- Municipal assoc.: Schöllkrippen
- Subdivisions: 3 Ortsteile

Government
  - Mayor (2020–26): Marc Babo (CSU)

Area
  - Total: 12.64 km^{2} (4.88 sq mi)
- Elevation: 206 m (676 ft)

Population (2025-12-31)
  - Total: 4,092
  - Density: 323.7/km^{2} (838.5/sq mi)
- Time zone: UTC+01:00 (CET)
  - Summer (DST): UTC+02:00 (CEST)
- Postal codes: 63825
- Dialling codes: 06024
- Vehicle registration: AB
- Website: www.schoellkrippen.de

Schöllkrippen (German pronunciation: [ˈʃœlkʁɪpn̩]) is a market municipality in the Aschaffenburg district in the Regierungsbezirk of Lower Franconia (Unterfranken) in Bavaria, Germany and seat of the Verwaltungsgemeinschaft (municipal association) of Schöllkrippen. It had a total population of around 4,300 in 2020, and experienced a decrease down to 4112 in 2023

== Geography ==
=== Location ===
Gemeindeteile

Schöllkrippen is the largest settlement of the Kahlgrund and lies on the river Kahl on the western edge of the Spessart (range). The main Ortsteil of Schöllkrippen lies at the foot of the Reuschberg.

=== Subdivisions ===
Schöllkrippen's Ortsteile are Schöllkrippen, Schneppenbach and Hofstädten.

Schöllkrippen Ortsteil consists of the following Orte: Ernstkirchen, Langenborn, Reuschberg, Röderhof, Schabernack and Schöllkrippen proper.

=== Neighbouring municipalities ===
The neighbouring municipalities are from the north (clockwise): Westerngrund, Kleinkahl, Schöllkrippener Forst (an unincorporated area), Sommerkahl, Blankenbach, Krombach and Geiselbach.

== History ==
Schöllkrippen has long been the central settlement of the Upper Kahlgrund and a meeting point of roads at least since the Middle Ages. Old long distance trade routes such as the Birkenhainer Straße and the Eselsweg pass nearby.

What had in the past been considered a prehistoric Celtic circular rampart, the Alte Burg or Altenburg on the nearby Reuschberg, is now thought to date to medieval times.

The church St. Katharina is first mentioned in a document in 1184. In 1449, the Lukaskapelle is built.

Due to its location, the town served as seat of the local administration of the Archbishops of Mainz In 1338, it became the seat of one of six Forsthuben in the Spessart territory controlled by Mainz. For a long time, Schöllkrippen also was a border town, as the river Kahl was the border to the Krombacher Landgericht, which from 1666 until its integration into the Kingdom of Bavaria was owned by the Counts of Schönborn.

In 1814, Schöllkrippen came to the Kingdom of Bavaria and was granted town rights.

In 1898, the Kahlgrundbahn (railway) commenced service between Schöllkrippen and Kahl am Main, creating economic impetus for the region by linking it to the national railway system.

== Economy ==
Schöllkrippen's central location in the Kahlgrund has led the market municipality to grow into a local shopping hub since the mid-1990s. The many discount retailers serve not only customers from the Spessart from Wiesen through Heigenbrücken to Heinrichsthal, but also from the upper Kahlgrund from Geiselbach to Blankenbach and the middle Kahlgrund from Königshofen through Mömbris to Niedersteinbach along with Eichenberg, Rottenberg and Feldkahl.

After the carwash manufacturer WashTec withdrew from its Schöllkrippen location at the Augsburg-based mother company’s behest, the sprawling halls and plots of land on the Ernstkirchen Gemarkung (traditional rural cadastral area, this one lying on the way out of the municipality towards Blankenbach) lay empty for nearly three years. In mid-2006, the municipality managed to sell the Industriepark Ernstkirchen to various firms. Roughly two thirds of the area went to the firm Ferratec from Hösbach, who then housed their production equipment here. The rest was shared among four smaller firms as well as the market municipality of Schöllkrippen, which built a new building yard there.

In late 2004, Schöllkrippen was chosen as the most livable place in the Bavarian Lower Main (Bayerischer Untermain).

== Governance ==
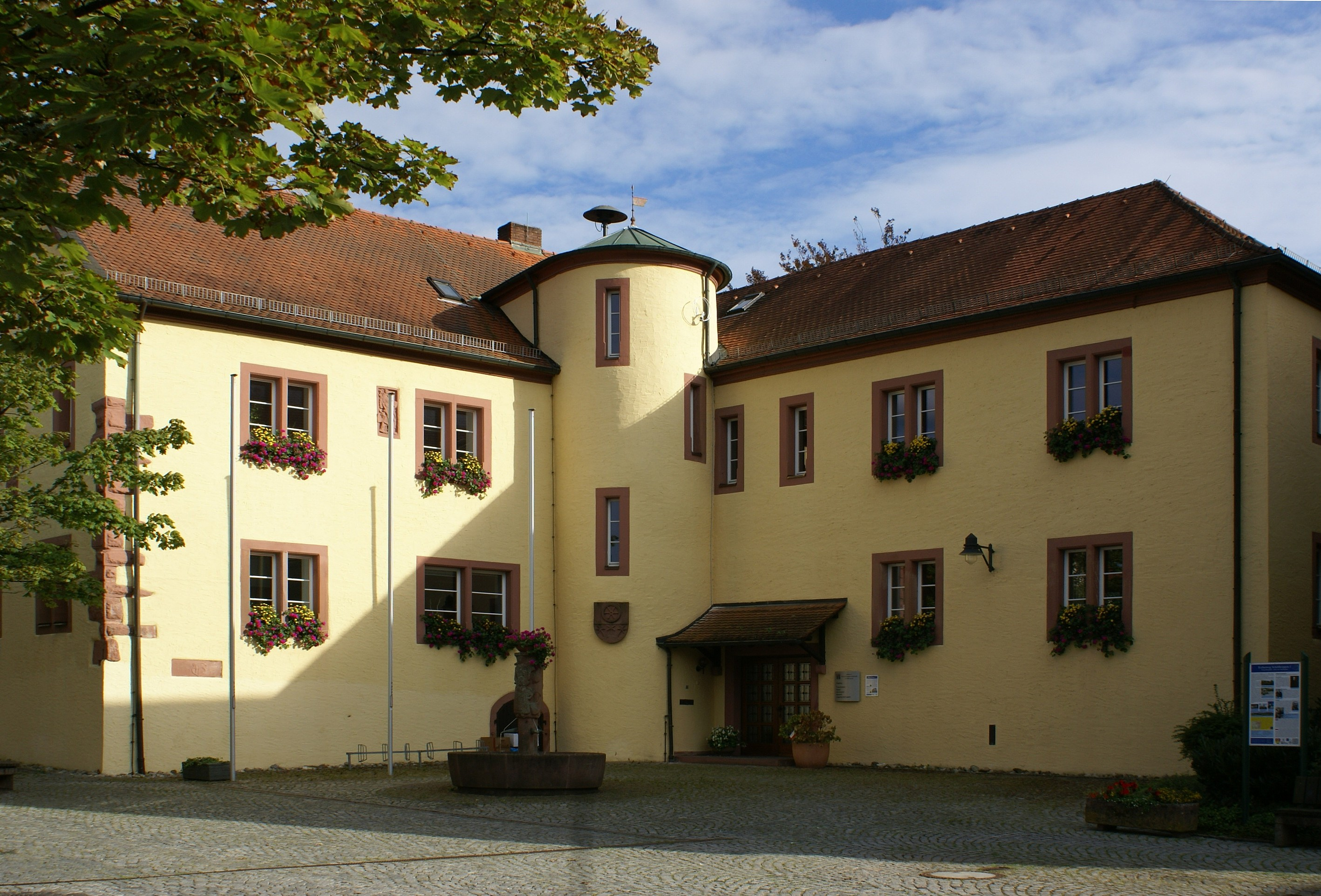
Town hall of the Verwaltungsgemeinschaft located in the former Schloss

The market municipality (Marktgemeinde) is the administrative seat of the Verwaltungsgemeinschaft of Schöllkrippen, which, besides Schöllkrippen, includes the municipalities of Blankenbach, Kleinkahl, Krombach, Sommerkahl, Westerngrund and Wiesen. Schöllkrippen has held the status of "market" since 1963.

=== Town council ===
The council is made up of 16 council members, not counting the mayor.

| | CSU | SPD | Grüne | FWG | Total |
| 2002 | 7 | 1 | 1 | 7 | 16 seats |
| 2008 | 7 | 0 | 2 | 7 | 16 seats |

(as at municipal election held on 2 March 2008)

=== Coat of arms ===
The municipality’s arms might be described thus: Per fess gules a wheel spoked of six argent, Or in base a mount of three vert issuant therefrom three morningstars sable, the dexter in bend, the middle in pale and the sinister in bend sinister.

The arms were designed sometime about 1950.

After the Counts of Rieneck died out in 1559, Schöllkrippen passed to the Archbishopric of Mainz, with which it stayed from 1670 to 1803. As early as 1670, the Bishops of Mainz held great parts of the area around Schöllkrippen. For this hegemony stands the six-spoked silver wheel – the Wheel of Mainz – on the red field. The tinctures gules and argent (red and silver) were Mainz’s colours. The three morningstars below the partition are taken from a seal of the Amt of Schöllkrippen, whose circumscription read “SIG. AMPT SCHÖLLKRIPPEN”. Although this does indeed mention the name Schöllkrippen, it was surely no municipal seal, but rather more likely a local official’s personal coat of arms. Strengthening this assumption are the letters M and W on each side of the arms, although any official in Schöllkrippen at that time with these initials is thus far unknown. Because the morningstars were such an unusual charge, they were chosen for the municipality’s new coat of arms, which has been borne since 1954.

== Attractions ==
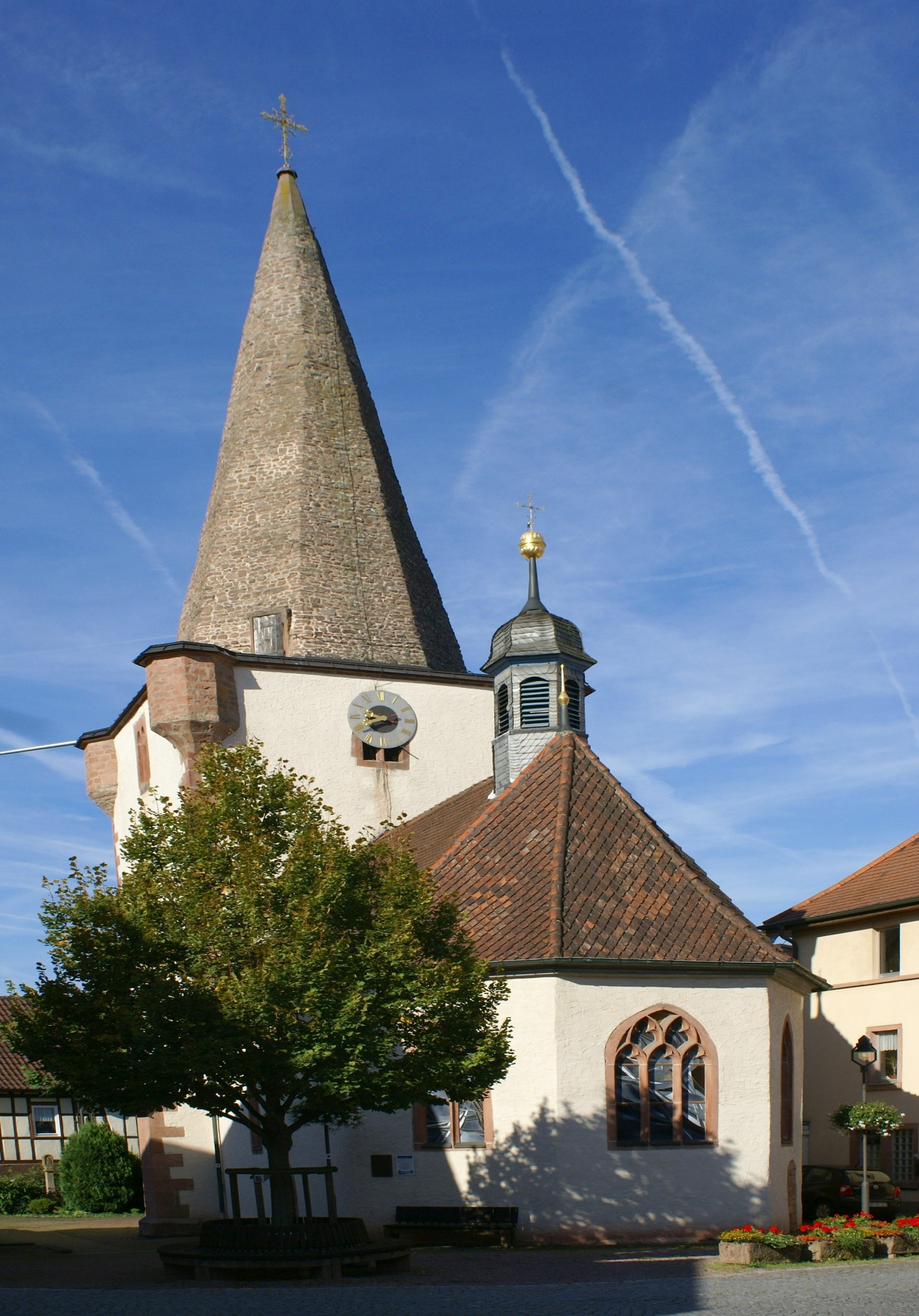
Lukaskapelle

The town centre features the medieval Lukaskapelle, a small fortified church (1449). The former Schloss nearby is now the seat of the local administration. Its original moat and curtain wall have been removed. The Sackhaus, which was used to store local taxes paid in goods, is today the largest half-timbered building in town. Its oldest part dates to 1473.

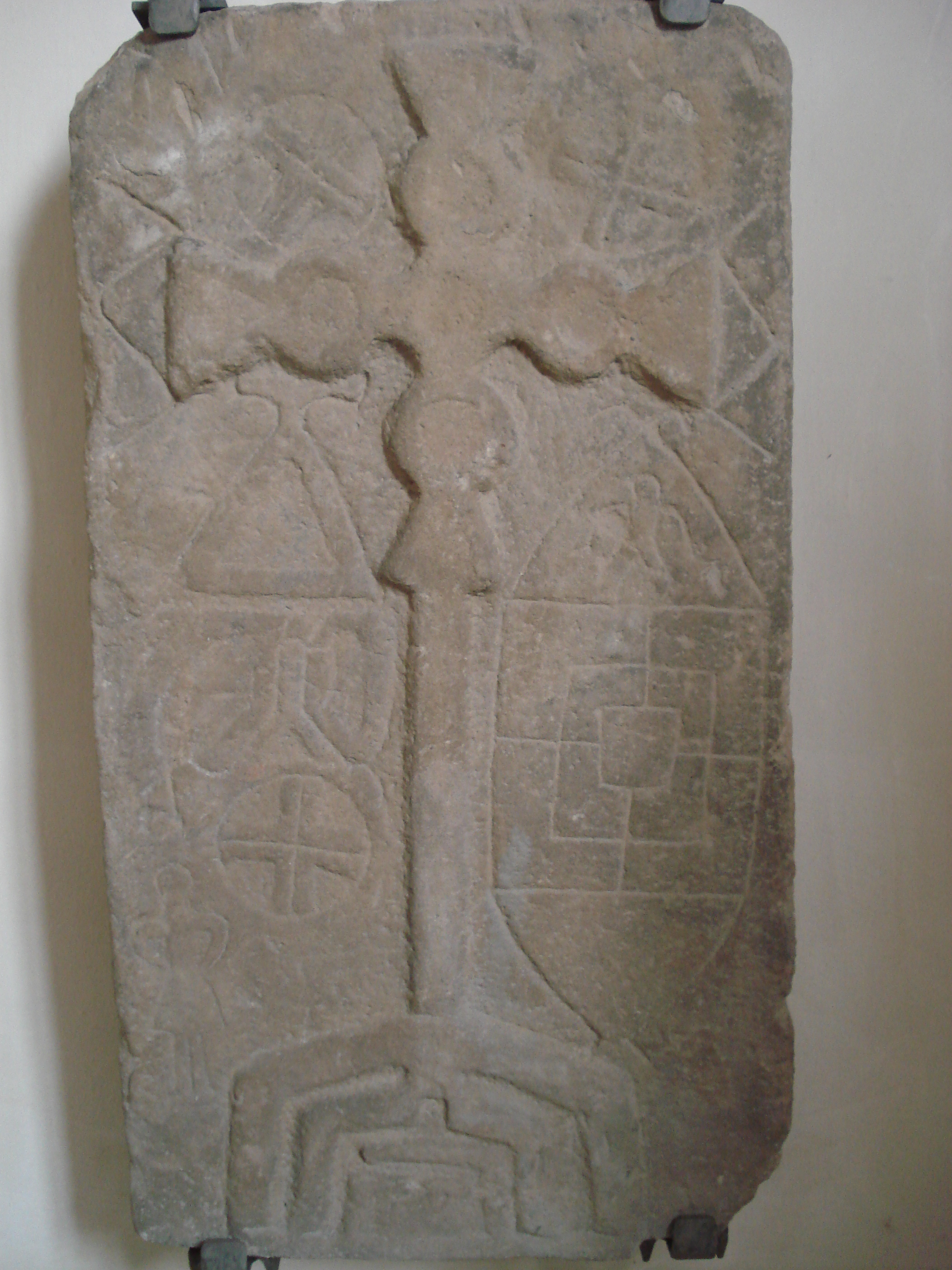
Early medieval stone tablet found in the church St. Katharina

The church St. Katharina in Ernstkirchen was mentioned first in 1184. In the 14th century, the original Romanesque church was reconstructed with a Gothic vaulted ceiling and an octagonal tower. Over the centuries, the church was redesigned several times in different styles (Baroque, Gothic Revical), but in 1958/67 the church was mostly returned to its early Gothic state (although the tower roof retains its Baroque onion shape). During this renovation, an early medieval stone tablet of unknown date was discovered, which indicates a very early ecclesial presence at this location. About one meter in height, stylistically, it has been linked to the Hiberno-Scottish mission. The tablet shows a Crux gemmate surrounded by other symbols that are hard to identify, including possible moon and sun symbols and a type of "checkers board". It likely was removed from a visible position in the church around the year 1300 and buried beneath the altar.

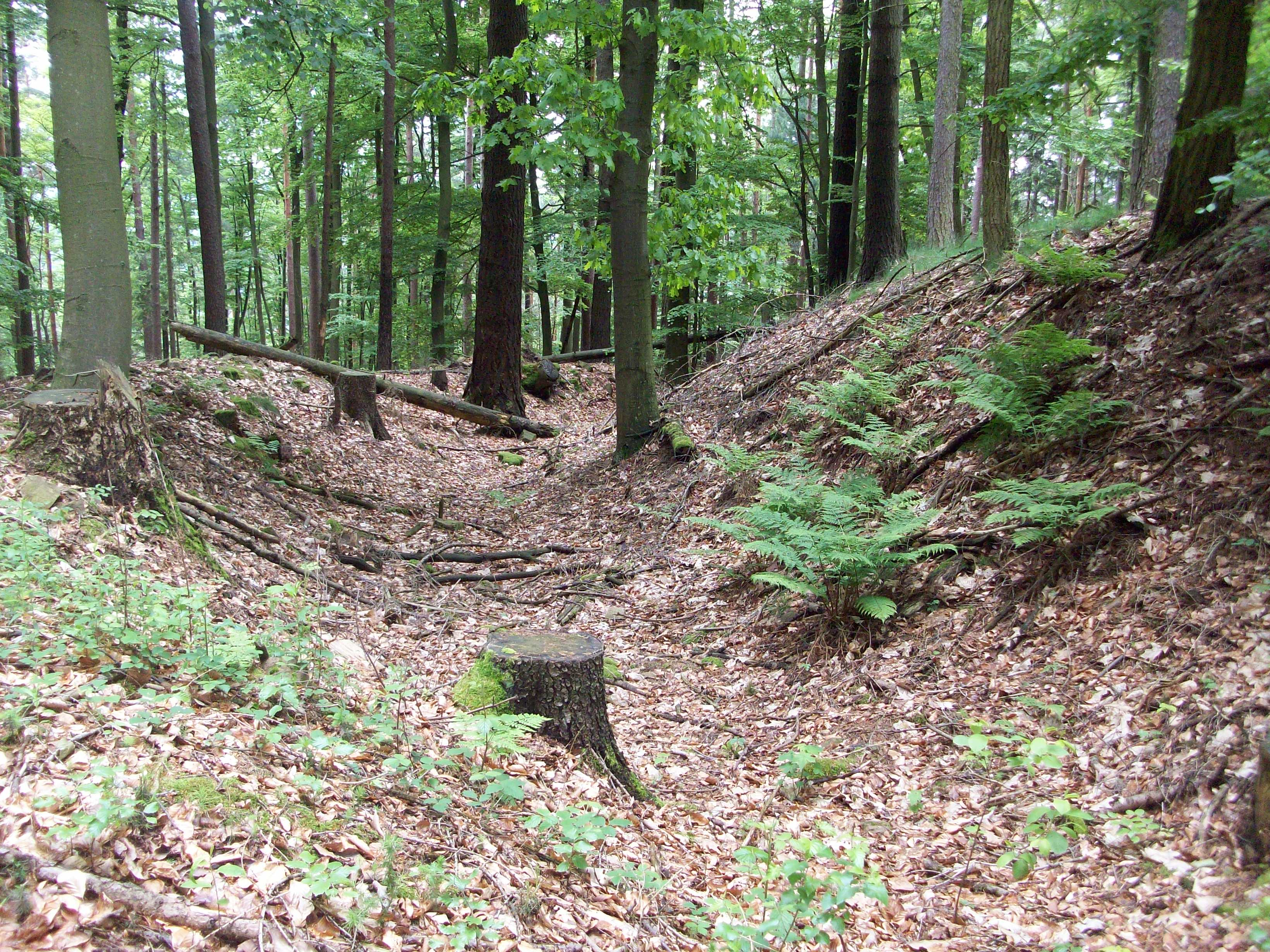
Remains of the Alte Burg

The Alte Burg on the peak of the Reuschberg is a sort of circular rampart, with remains of both earth and masonry walls, long thought to date to the La Tène period. However, excavations in 2005 indicate that it most likely is a 10th-century refuge castle, with some elements added later (11th or 12th century). Over the centuries, locals have used the fortification as a source of construction materials, reducing the remains to just foundations. The fortifications are roughly oval in form and encompass an area of roughly 1,300 square meters. A break in the wall likely once served as a gate. Research also revealed signs of internal buildings, including the foundation of a central tower.

== Infrastructure ==
=== Transport ===
Schöllkrippen is the seat of the Kahlgrund Verkehrs-GmbH (KVG; "Kahlgrund Transport Company, Limited"), which runs the railway line to Kahl am Main. This has been served since 11 December 2005 by trains of the Hessische Landesbahn ("Hessian State Railway" – even though Schöllkrippen is in Bavaria), most of which go to the main railway station in Hanau. The KGV also runs its extensive bus network in the north Spessart as far as Aschaffenburg. With route changes, this has been expanded into neighbouring Hesse. New bus connections to Gelnhausen, Freigericht/Somborn and Heigenbrücken were brought into service on 10 December 2006 to afford the region of the upper Kahlgrund and its many commuters better links to neighbouring Hesse.

Schöllkrippen is connected to the road network as follows:

- Autobahn A 3 (through the Hösbach interchange), between Frankfurt (roughly 50 km away) and Würzburg (roughly 80 km away).
- Autobahn A 45 (through the Alzenau interchange), between Gießen (90 km away) and Aschaffenburg (roughly 20 km away).
- Autobahn A 66 (through the Gelnhausen/West interchange), between Fulda (90 km away) and Gelnhausen/Hanau (roughly 15 and 30 km away, respectively).
- Staatsstraßen (State Roads) 2305 (Frammersbach-Schöllkrippen-Alzenau) and 2306 (Schöllkrippen-Geiselbach-Gelnhausen).

== Education ==
The district's biggest Hauptschule served an estimated 550 students in the 2007/2008 school year. The school takes in pupils from Heigenbrücken, Heinrichsthal, Geiselbach and Krombach.

== Notable people ==
- Johannes Scherer (b. 1973 in Schöllkrippen) German radio and television moderator and comedian.
