= Kahl am Main =

Kahl a.Main
- Municipality
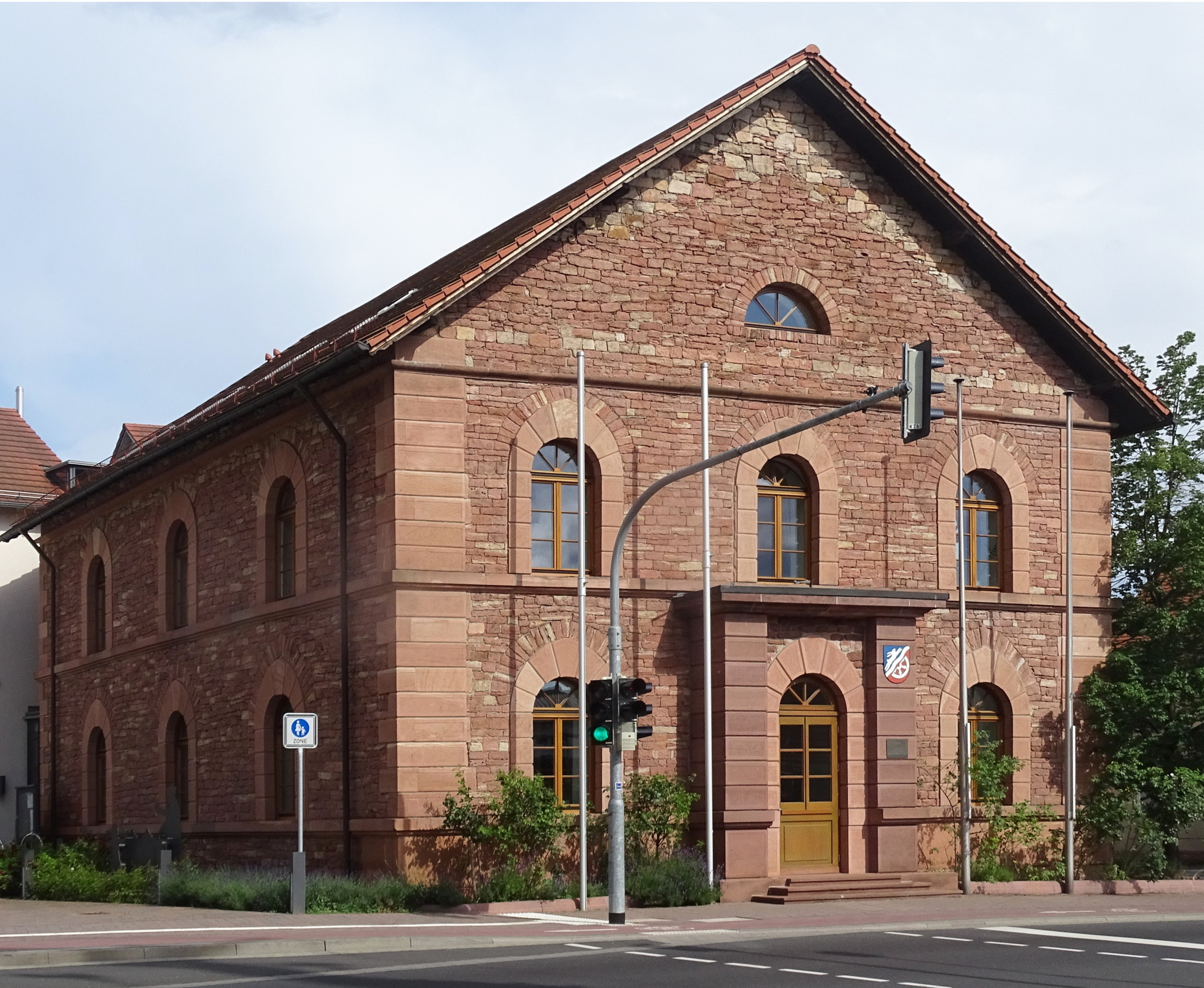
- Town hall

- Coat of arms

- Location of Kahl a.Main within Aschaffenburg district
- Interactive map of Kahl a.Main
- Location within Germany Location within Bavaria
- Coordinates: 50°4′5″N 9°0′24″E
- Country: Germany
- State: Bavaria
- Admin. region: Unterfranken
- District: Aschaffenburg

Government
  - Mayor (2023–29): Julia Fischer (SPD)

Area
  - Total: 10.64 km^{2} (4.11 sq mi)
- Elevation: 110 m (360 ft)

Population (2025-12-31)
  - Total: 8,544
  - Density: 803.0/km^{2} (2,080/sq mi)
- Time zone: UTC+01:00 (CET)
  - Summer (DST): UTC+02:00 (CEST)
- Postal codes: 63796
- Dialling codes: 06188
- Vehicle registration: AB
- Website: www.kahl-main.de

Kahl am Main (German pronunciation: [ˈkaːl ʔam ˈmaɪn], lit. 'Kahl on the Main'; officially Kahl a.Main) is a municipality in the Aschaffenburg district in the Regierungsbezirk of Lower Franconia (Unterfranken) in Bavaria, Germany. It has around 7,500 inhabitants.

== Geography ==
=== Location ===
Gemeindeteile

Kahl am Main lies 107 m above sea level and includes, at the mouth of the river Kahl, the lowest-lying point in the state of Bavaria and covers an area of approximately 11 km^{2}. It also lies right on the boundary with Hesse in a favourable location with regards to transport between Aschaffenburg and Hanau (Main-Kinzig-Kreis).

== Demographics ==
Kahl has a rate of population growth between −0.1% and 0.1%. It also has an aging population with the largest age group being 65 and above in 2014. The average age has increased from 46 in 2005 to 47.5 in 2014. Even though there have been fewer births than deaths consistently since 1975, the city has experiences slight growth due to newcomers.

== Governance ==
=== Municipality council ===
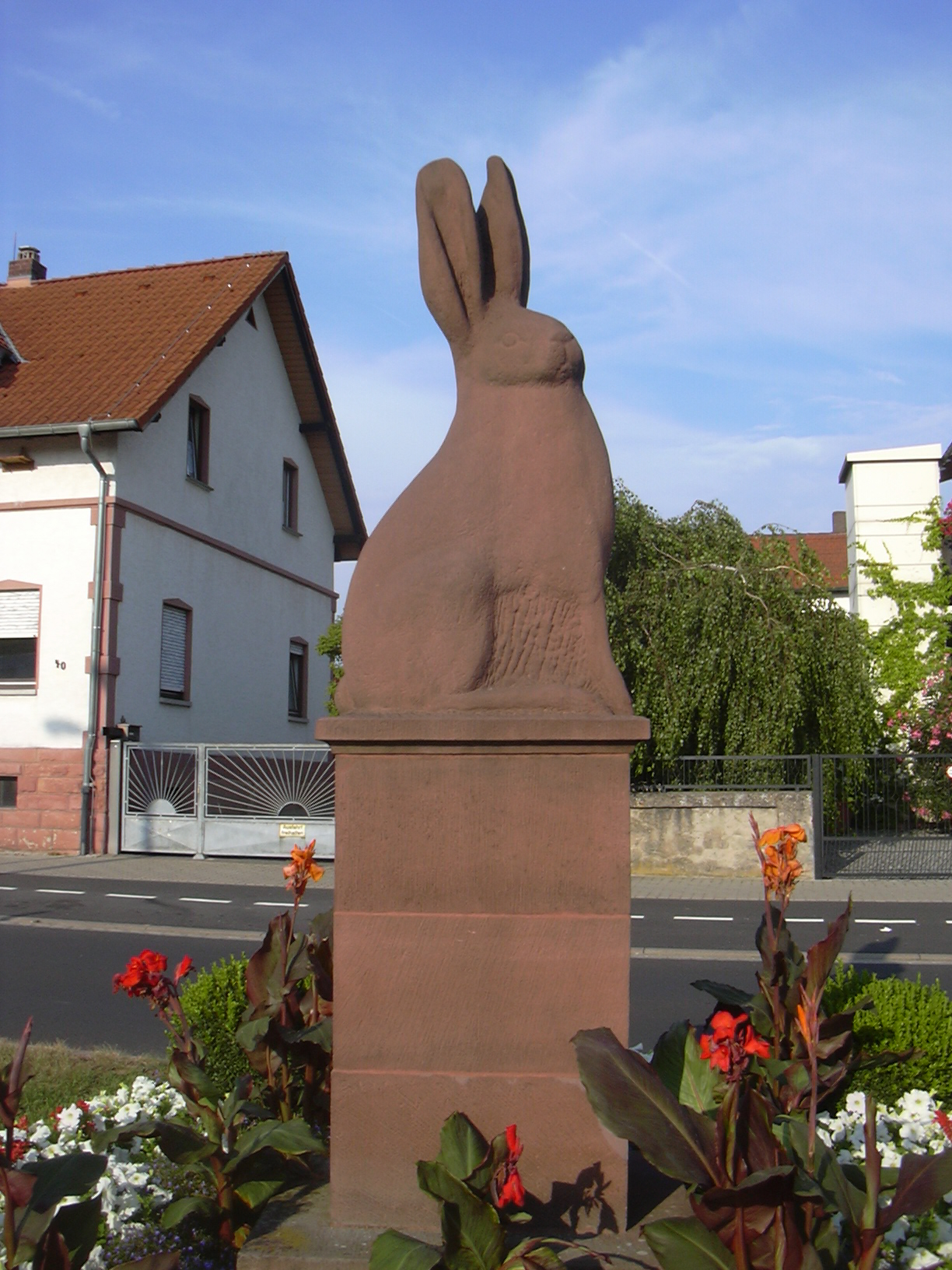
Kahler Sandhase

The council is made up of 21 council members, counting the mayor.

	CSU	SPD	Alliance 90/The Greens	Free Voters	Young Union	The Actives	Independent	Total
2008	9	7	3	2	-	-	-	21 seats
2014	9	7	5	-	-	-	-	21 seats
2020	6	5	5	-	1	3	1	21 seats

=== Coat of arms ===
The municipality's arms might be described thus: Party per bend sinister wavy, the parting surmounted by a bend sinister wavy argent, azure a coney courant of the first in bend sinister, gules a demi-wheel spoked of six of the first couped in bend sinister.

The municipality of Kahl lies on a bend in the river Main, and this is referenced by the bend sinister wavy (slanted wavy stripe) in the arms. This also refers to the river Kahl, which is part of the municipality's name. The tinctures argent and gules (silver and red) and the half-wheel refer to Electoral Mainz's former overlordship in the municipality. The silver hare recalls the Kahl dwellers’ nickname Sandhasen (“Sand Hares”) – sometimes also Sandbauern (“Sand Farmers”) – arising from the municipality's lower crop yields than in other Main municipalities due to the sandy soil. Since 1806 the place has belonged to Bavaria, which is reflected in the tinctures argent and azure (blue).

The arms have been borne since 19 July 1960.

=== Town twinning ===
- Villefontaine, Isère, France since 1981
- Budakalász, Pest County, Hungary since 1998
- St. Ingbert-Rohrbach, Saarland, Germany 1968–1970
- Leutasch, Tyrol, Austria

The latter relationship is a "town friendship".

== Economy ==
Within Kahl's municipal limits, roughly 350 businesses have their seats, among them Kopp (500 employees), Linde Material Handling GmbH (550 employees) and Singulus Technologies (350 employees), three big companies in engine building and electronics. Business taxes from all businesses lie between €3,300,000 and €9,100,000 each year.

== Culture and sightseeing ==
=== Clubs ===
Clubs include the Feuerwehr FF-Kahl (fire brigade) and the Rotes Kreuz Kahl. There was an umbrella group, the Vereinsgemeinschaft Kahl (“Kahl Club municipality”), to which many of the local clubs belonged, and which, among other things, staged the yearly Kerb. Even though the municipality dissolved in 2016, the Kerb has been taken up by several other municipalities and is now organized by volunteers.

=== Buildings ===
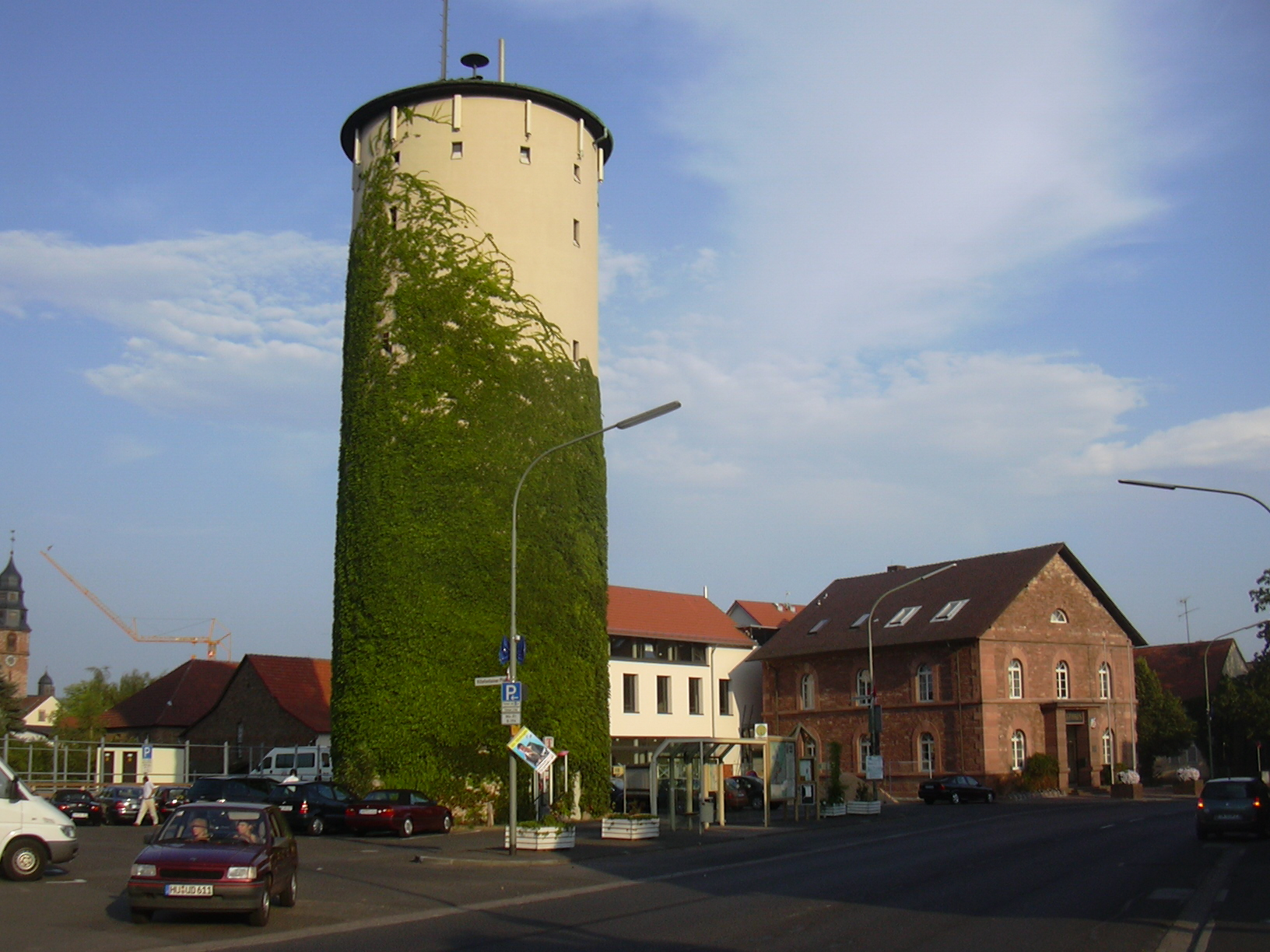
Town hall and watertower

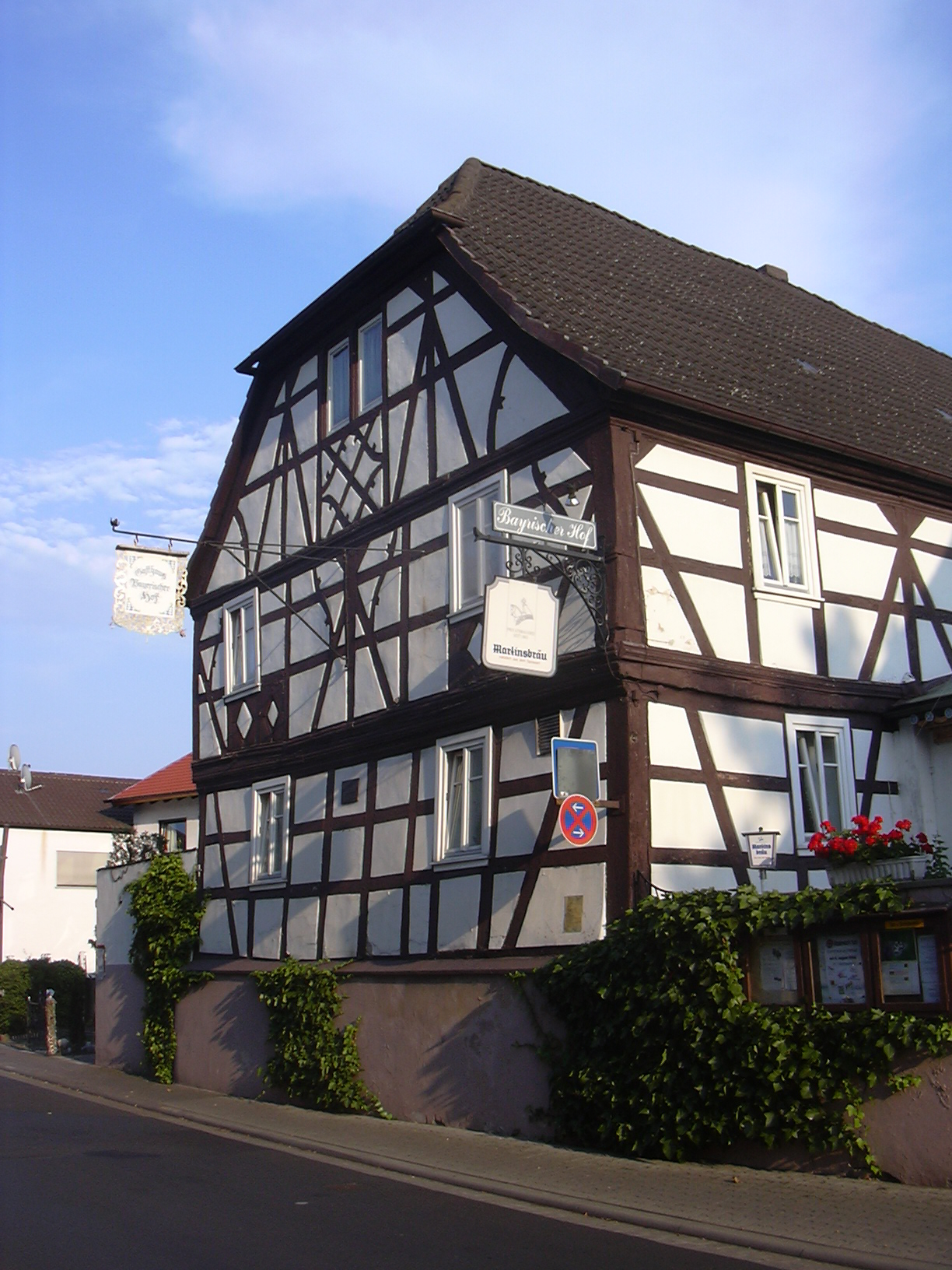
Timber-frame house (17th century)

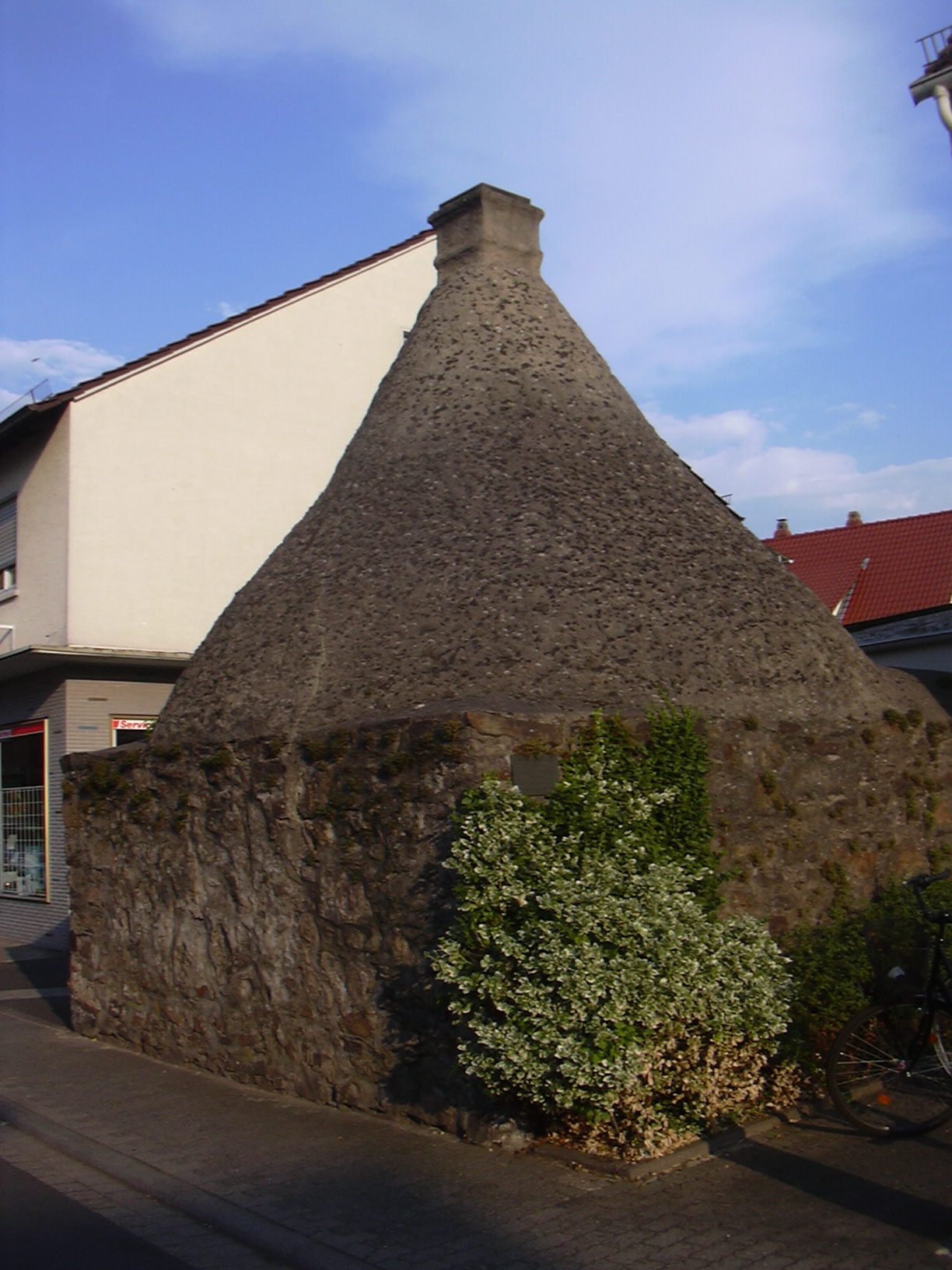
Bakehouse (about 1650)

- Baroque Schloss Emmerichshofen, built in 1768 by Baron von Bentzel-Sternau.
- Saint Margaret's Catholic parish church (Katholische Pfarrkirche Sankt Margareta) in Baroque Revival style, made of red quarried Buntsandstein. A church was first mentioned at this site in 1330.
- Evangelical Cross Church (Evangelische Kreuzkirche) in Bauhaus style.
- Town hall: former customs house, built in 1830 in Neoclassical style, after 1834 a match and cigarette factory, after that an inn, weather station and school, since 1939 the municipality administration's seat.
- Watertower, built in 1931.
- Bakehouse (Backes): public oven, in which until 1938 bread was baked for almost 300 years. Today it is one of the oldest constructions of the city.
- Timber-frame house (former estate), known to have stood before the Thirty Years' War; later a house and an inn; damaged by improper drain restoration.
- Sand Hare Monument (Sandhasendenkmal): Kahl landmark of the former sand quarrying in the region, built in 1952 by Hermann Kröckel. The sand hare is also a charge in the municipality's arms.
- Mills on the Kahl: Once, eleven mills were running on the lower three kilometres of the Kahlgrund upstream from where the Kahl empties into the Main. The first was mentioned in 1358. Ground were grain, mustard seed and oilseed. “Sand mills” played a rôle beginning about 1900. In one of the fulling mills with 15 workers, Nikolaus Wahl brought the world's first automatic feltmaking machine into service in 1904. At the beginning of the 21st century, only a few mills bear witness to that time, and some have been converted to houses: Obere Fallersmühle, Untere Fallersmühle (rolling mill), Schäfereimühle, Lohmühle, Nassmühle. Since the millers often backed the water up too high, there were time and again floods. In particular, the Nassmühle (literally, “Wet Mill”) came to grief one day in the late 16th century when local farmers, angered at having their harvest wiped out by flooding, stormed the mill on 2 June 1573 and destroyed it. A hiking path with documentary plaques follows the historic mill route.

=== Parks ===
- The Vogelpark Kahl ("bird park") was founded in 1971 and was a three-hectare non-profit aviary and open-air complex for domestic and exotic birds. On 30 June 2006, the bird park was closed on consideration of the bird flu regulations, such as those requiring confinement.

=== Nature ===
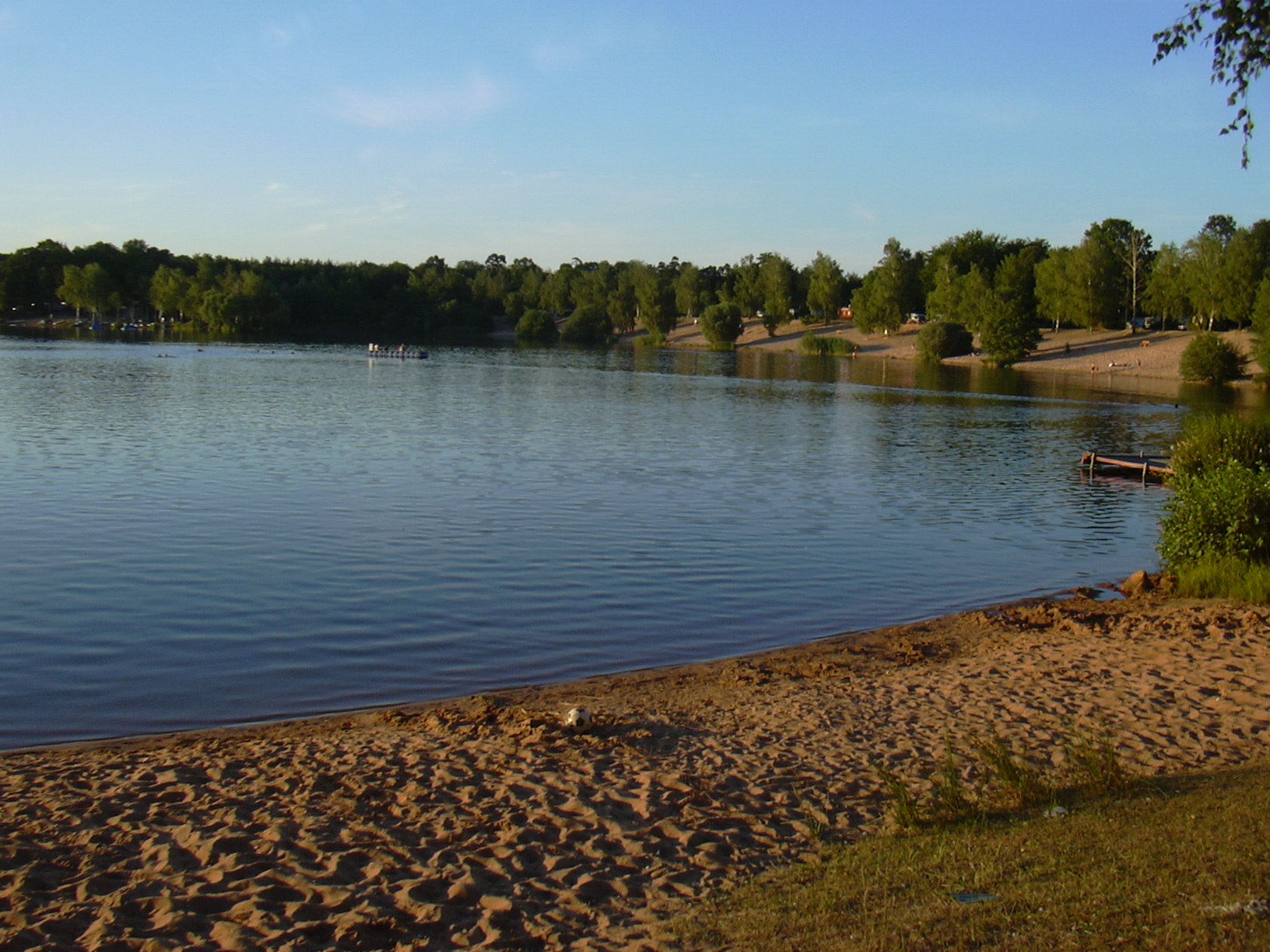
Typical sand slopes at the Campingsee

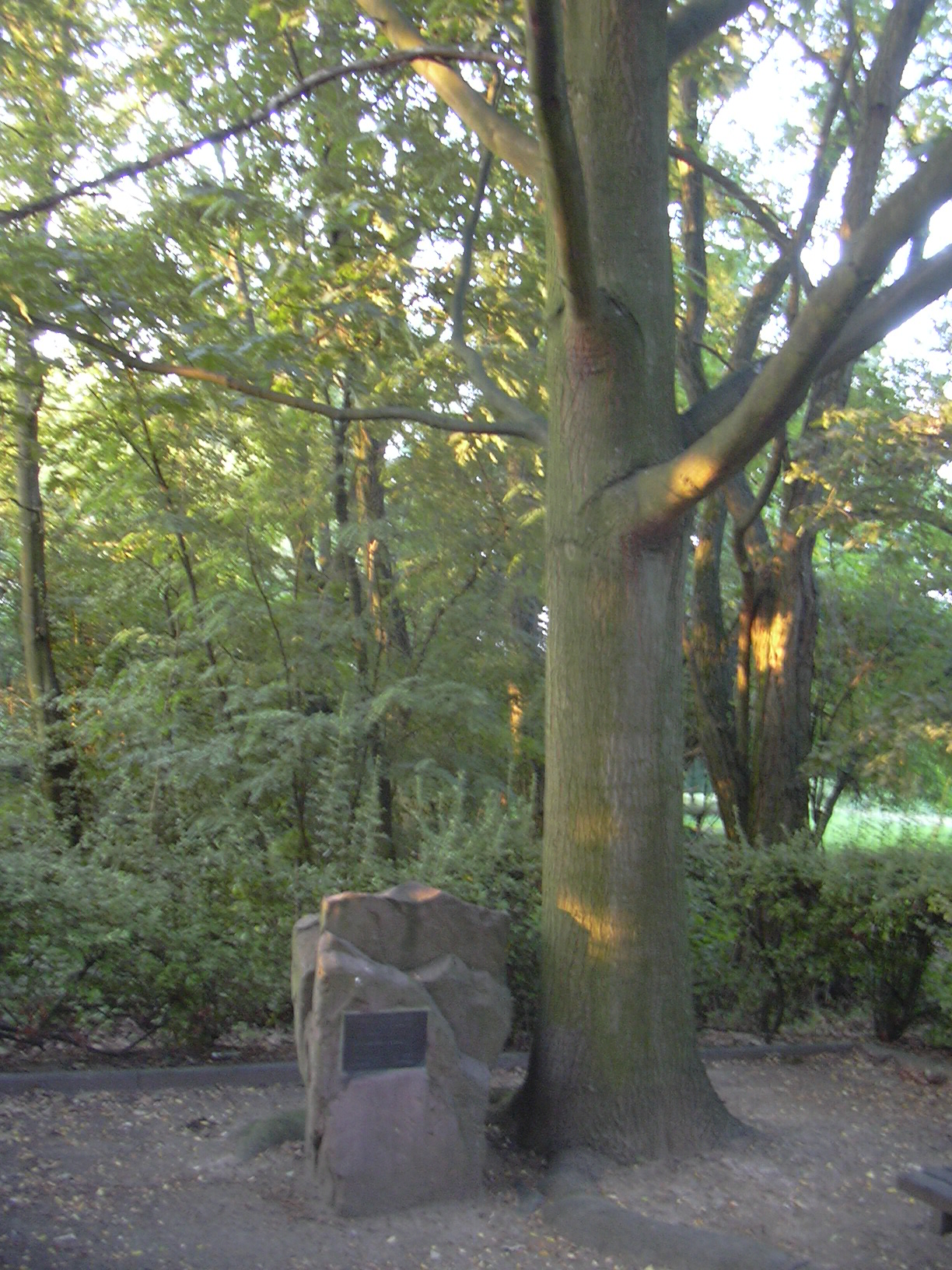
“Witches’ Oak” monument

The local scenery is characterized by forest and water, which make up 75% of the municipal area. The quarry lakes of the Kahl Lake Plateau (Kahler Seenplatte) with outdoor bathing at Waldseebad (former Emma-Nord stripmine) and Campingsee (Freigericht-Ost) with one of Bavaria's biggest campsites as well as the angling ponds of the former Emma-Süd pit and the Vorspessartseen (lakes) offer opportunities for angling, boating, swimming and surfing. Five hiking trails and a fitness course (Vitaparcours) lead through the Kahl nature areas with their typical vegetation and sand flora. Many wild herbs, hogweed, wild carrot and malva grow in the meadows alongside the Main, where there is also a small campsite.

The natural monument Hexeneiche (“Witches’ Oak”) on the B 8 was destroyed on 7 August 1970 by a lightning strike. The oak, known to have already been standing in the Thirty Years' War, had to be felled on 8 June 1971. A newly planted oak and a memorial stone recall the witchhunts in the early 17th century, to which 69 women and 21 men fell victim here.

On holidays, the railway line between Kahl am Main and Schöllkrippen is often used for “Historic Steam Locomotive Journeys”.

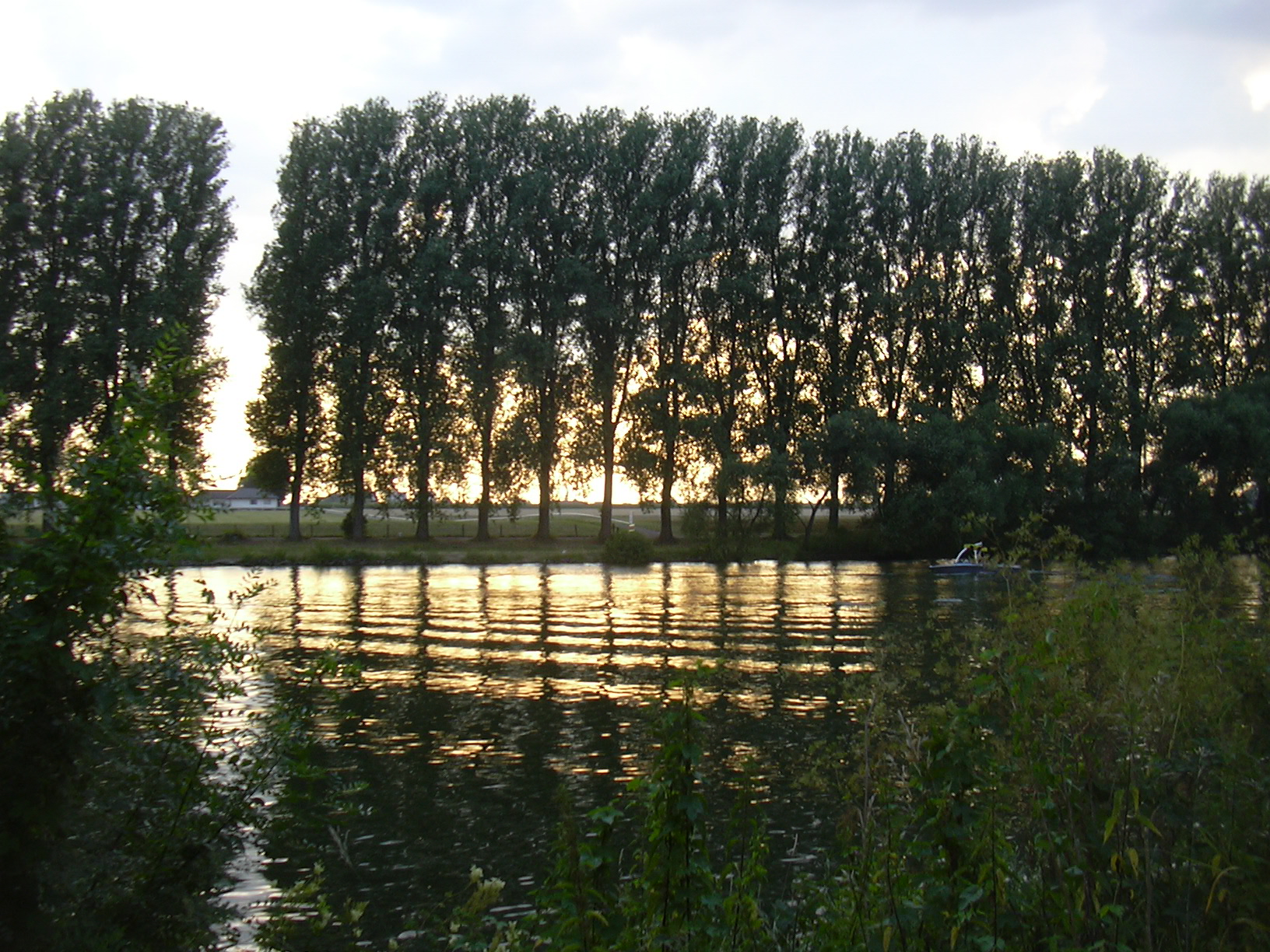
Landscape on the Main near the mouth of the Kahl

The Kahltal-Spessart cycling-hiking trail starts at Kahl.

== Infrastructure ==
=== Transport ===
Kahl am Main lies in a favourable location with regards to transport between Aschaffenburg and Hanau with good transport links to Autobahn A 45 (Gießen - Aschaffenburg) as well as Autobahn A 3 (Frankfurt am Main - Würzburg - Nuremberg - Munich). Bundesstraßen 8 (Aschaffenburg - Hanau), 43 and 43A link Kahl am Main to the Frankfurt Rhine Main Region.

The Main–Spessart railway from Frankfurt to Würzburg, where it connects to Nuremberg and Munich, runs through the Kahl am Main station, which is served by Regional-Express services. Here the Kahlgrundbahn (to Schöllkrippen) branches off. Kahl has no goods station. The nearest ones are in Hanau and Aschaffenburg.

The nearest airport is Frankfurt Airport.

=== Utilities ===
==== Nuclear power station ====
Despite the name, the first nuclear reactor in Germany, the Versuchsatomkraftwerk Kahl ("Kahl Experimental Nuclear Power Station") was not built in Kahl am Main but in the neighbouring municipality of Großwelzheim (now part of Karlstein am Main). There were three reasons the plant was not named after Großwelzheim:

- Kahl was easier to pronounce for the U.S. personnel;
- Kahl had a railway station; Großwelzheim did not;
- the plant got its mail from the Kahl Post Office.

The power plant was shut down in 1985 and the reactors have been dismantled.
