= Hollenbach (disambiguation) =

Hollenbach is a municipality in the district of Aichach-Friedberg in Bavaria in Germany.

Hollenbach or Höllenbach may also refer to:

- Alwyn Hollenbach (born 1985), former South African rugby union footballer
- David Hollenbach (born 1942), Jesuit priest, professor, author, and moral theologian
- Sam Hollenbach (born 1983), American football quarterback
- Shawn Hollenbach (born 1981), American comedian, writer and actor
- Todd Hollenbach (born 1960), American politician
- Höllenbach (Kahl), a river of Bavaria, Germany, tributary of the Kahl
