= Schöllkrippen (Verwaltungsgemeinschaft) =

- Verwaltungsgemeinschaft
- Location of Schöllkrippen within Aschaffenburg district
- Interactive map of Schöllkrippen
- Location within Germany Location within Bavaria
- Coordinates: 50°04′N 9°14′E
- Country: Germany
- State: Bavaria
- Admin. region: Lower Franconia
- District: Aschaffenburg
- Seat: Schöllkrippen
- Subdivisions: 7 municipalities

Area
  - Total: 67.32 km^{2} (25.99 sq mi)

Population (2025-12-31)
  - Total: 13,598
  - Density: 202.0/km^{2} (523.2/sq mi)
- Time zone: UTC+01:00 (CET)
  - Summer (DST): UTC+02:00 (CEST)
- Website: www.vg-schoellkrippen.de

Schöllkrippen is a Verwaltungsgemeinschaft (municipal association) in the district of Aschaffenburg in Bavaria, Germany. Its seat is in Schöllkrippen.

It consists of the following municipalities:

1. Blankenbach
2. Kleinkahl
3. Krombach
4. Schöllkrippen
5. Sommerkahl
6. Westerngrund
7. Wiesen
