= Heinrichsthal =

German municipality

- Municipality
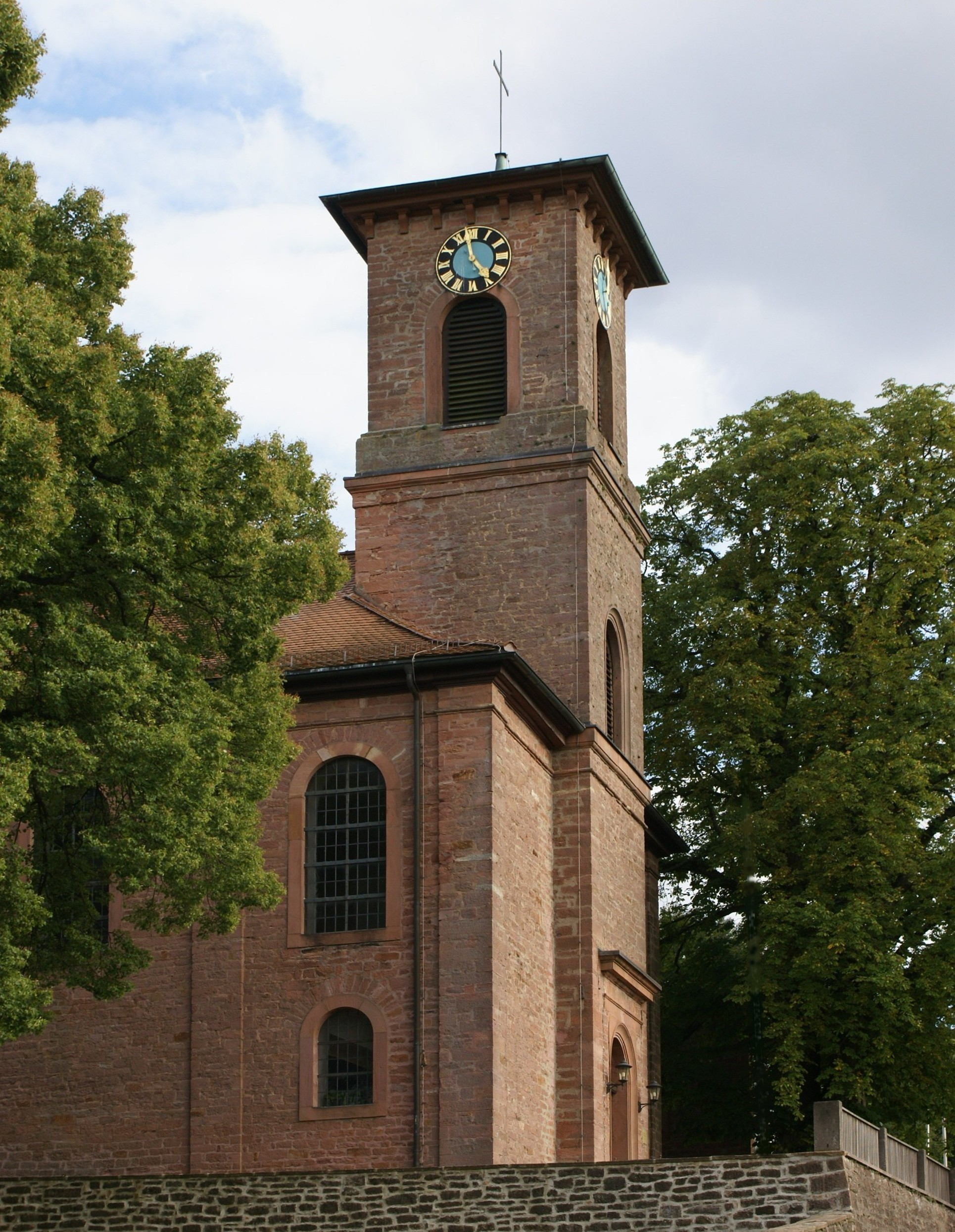
- Church of Saint George in Heinrichsthal

- Coat of arms

- Location of Heinrichsthal within Aschaffenburg district
- Interactive map of Heinrichsthal
- Location within Germany Location within Bavaria
- Coordinates: 50°04′N 09°21′E
- Country: Germany
- State: Bavaria
- Admin. region: Unterfranken
- District: Aschaffenburg
- Municipal assoc.: Heigenbrücken
- Subdivisions: 4 Ortsteile

Government
  - Mayor (2020–26): Udo Kunkel

Area
  - Total: 4.52 km^{2} (1.75 sq mi)
- Elevation: 436 m (1,430 ft)

Population (2025-12-31)
  - Total: 816
  - Density: 181/km^{2} (468/sq mi)
- Time zone: UTC+01:00 (CET)
  - Summer (DST): UTC+02:00 (CEST)
- Postal codes: 63871
- Dialling codes: 06020
- Vehicle registration: AB
- Website: www.heinrichsthal.de

Heinrichsthal is a municipality in the Aschaffenburg district in the Regierungsbezirk of Lower Franconia (Unterfranken) in Bavaria, Germany. It is part of the Verwaltungsgemeinschaft (Administrative community) of Heigenbrücken.

== Geography ==
=== Location ===
Constituent municipalities

Heinrichsthal lies in the Bavarian Lower Main (Bayerischer Untermain) in the Mittelgebirge (hill range) Spessart. It is a part of the district of Aschaffenburg.

=== Constituent municipalities ===
Heinrichsthal has the following Gemarkungen (traditional rural cadastral areas): Altenplos, Cottenbach, Heinersreuth, Unterwaiz. The two hamlets of Unterlohrgrund and Oberlohrgrund on district road AB 7 are parts of the municipality.

== History ==
Heinrichsthal developed in the early 1600s as a village of glass workers.

As part of the Archbishopric of Mainz, Heinrichsthal passed at Secularization in 1803 to the newly formed Principality of Aschaffenburg, with which it passed in 1814 (by this time it had become a department of the Grand Duchy of Frankfurt) to Bavaria. In the course of administrative reform in Bavaria, the current municipality came into being with the Gemeindeedikt (“Municipal Edict”) of 1818.

=== Population development ===
Within the municipal area lived 848 inhabitants in 1970, 892 in 1987 and 934 in 2000.

== Politics ==
=== Town council ===
The council is made up of 9 council members, counting the part-time mayor.

	CSU	SPD	Unabhängige Bürger	Total
2002	3	2	4	9 seats

(as at municipal election held on 3 March 2008)

=== Mayor ===
The Mayor is Udo Kunkel, elected in 2020.

== Economy and infrastructure ==
Municipal tax revenue in 1999 amounted to €384,000 (converted), of which business tax revenue accounted for €3,000.

According to official statistics, there were 87 workers on the social welfare contribution rolls working in producing businesses in 1998. In trade and transport this was 0. In other areas, 29 workers on the social welfare contribution rolls are employed, and 328 people are remote workers. There is one processing business. No businesses in construction, furthermore, in 1999, there were 11 agricultural operations with a working area of 170 ha, of which 85 ha was cropland and 84 ha was meadowland.

=== Education ===
The following institutions are to be found in Heinrichsthal (as of 1999):

- Kindergarten: 50 kindergarten places with 44 children
