= Heigenbrücken (Verwaltungsgemeinschaft) =

- Verwaltungsgemeinschaft
- Location of Heigenbrücken within Aschaffenburg district
- Interactive map of Heigenbrücken
- Location within Germany Location within Bavaria
- Coordinates: 50°02′N 9°23′E
- Country: Germany
- State: Bavaria
- Admin. region: Lower Franconia
- District: Aschaffenburg
- Seat: Heigenbrücken
- Subdivisions: 2 municipalities

Area
  - Total: 11.25 km^{2} (4.34 sq mi)

Population (2025-12-31)
  - Total: 3,040
  - Density: 270/km^{2} (700/sq mi)
- Time zone: UTC+01:00 (CET)
  - Summer (DST): UTC+02:00 (CEST)
- Website: www.vg-heigenbruecken.de

Heigenbrücken is a Verwaltungsgemeinschaft (municipal association) in the district of Aschaffenburg in Bavaria, Germany. Its seat is in Heigenbrücken. It consists of the following municipalities:

1. Heigenbrücken
2. Heinrichsthal
