= Höllenbach (Kahl) =

River in Germany

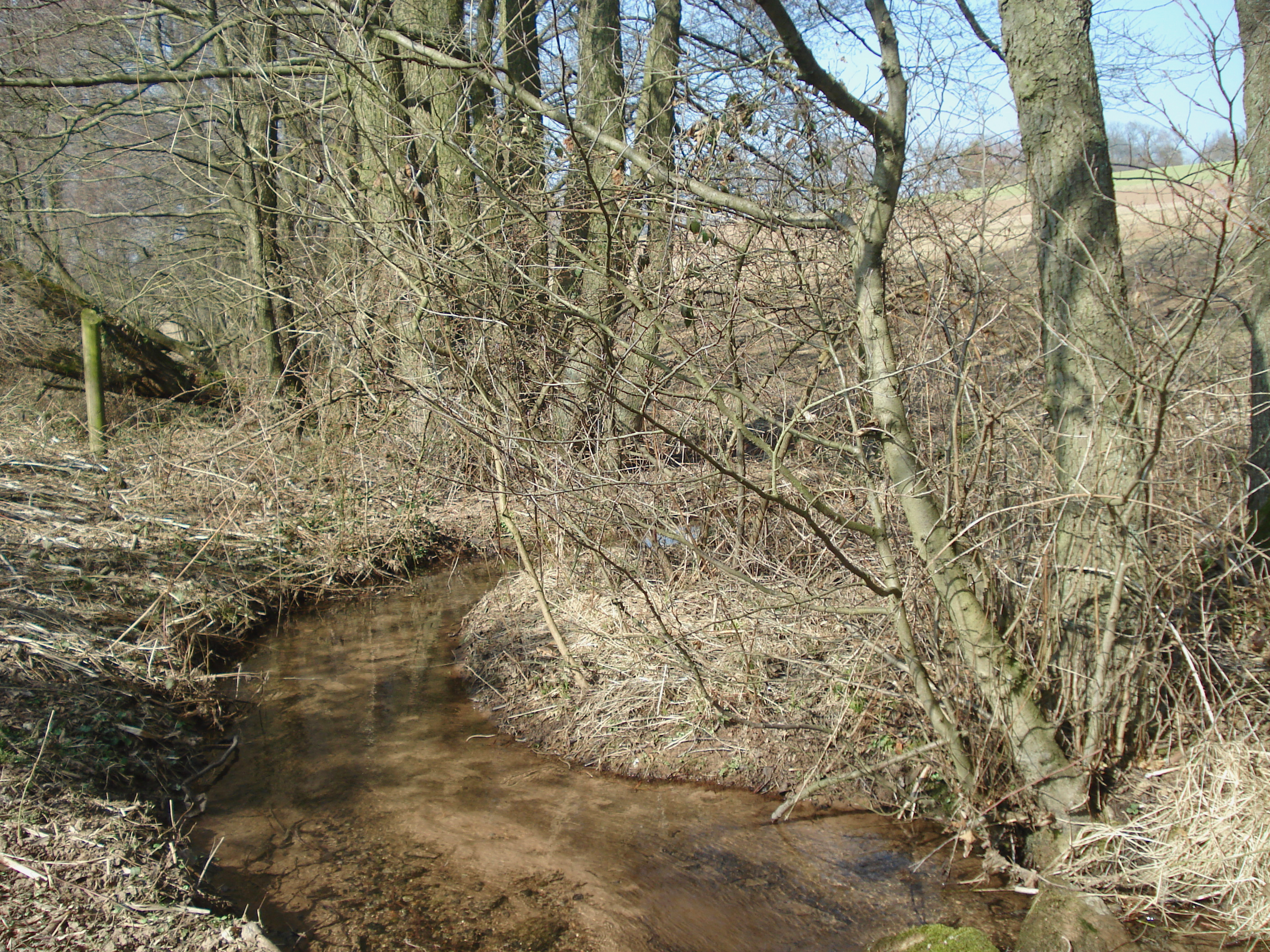
- The Höllenbach before Schöllkrippen

Location
- Country: Germany
- States: Bavaria

Physical characteristics
- Mouth
  - location: Kahl
  - coordinates: 50.0863°N 9.2449°E

Basin features
- Progression: Kahl→ Main→ Rhine→ North Sea

The Höllenbach is a small river of Bavaria, Germany. It is a left tributary of the Kahl in Schöllkrippen.

The Höllenbach rises at the Röderhof on the Reuschberg (415 m). It flows westwards through a water protection area, past the nature adventure pool to Schöllkrippen. There it flows into the Kahl opposite the mouth of the Westerbach, under the intersection of state roads 2305 and 2306.

== See also ==
- List of rivers of Bavaria
