= Wiesen, Bavaria =

Wiesen
- Municipality
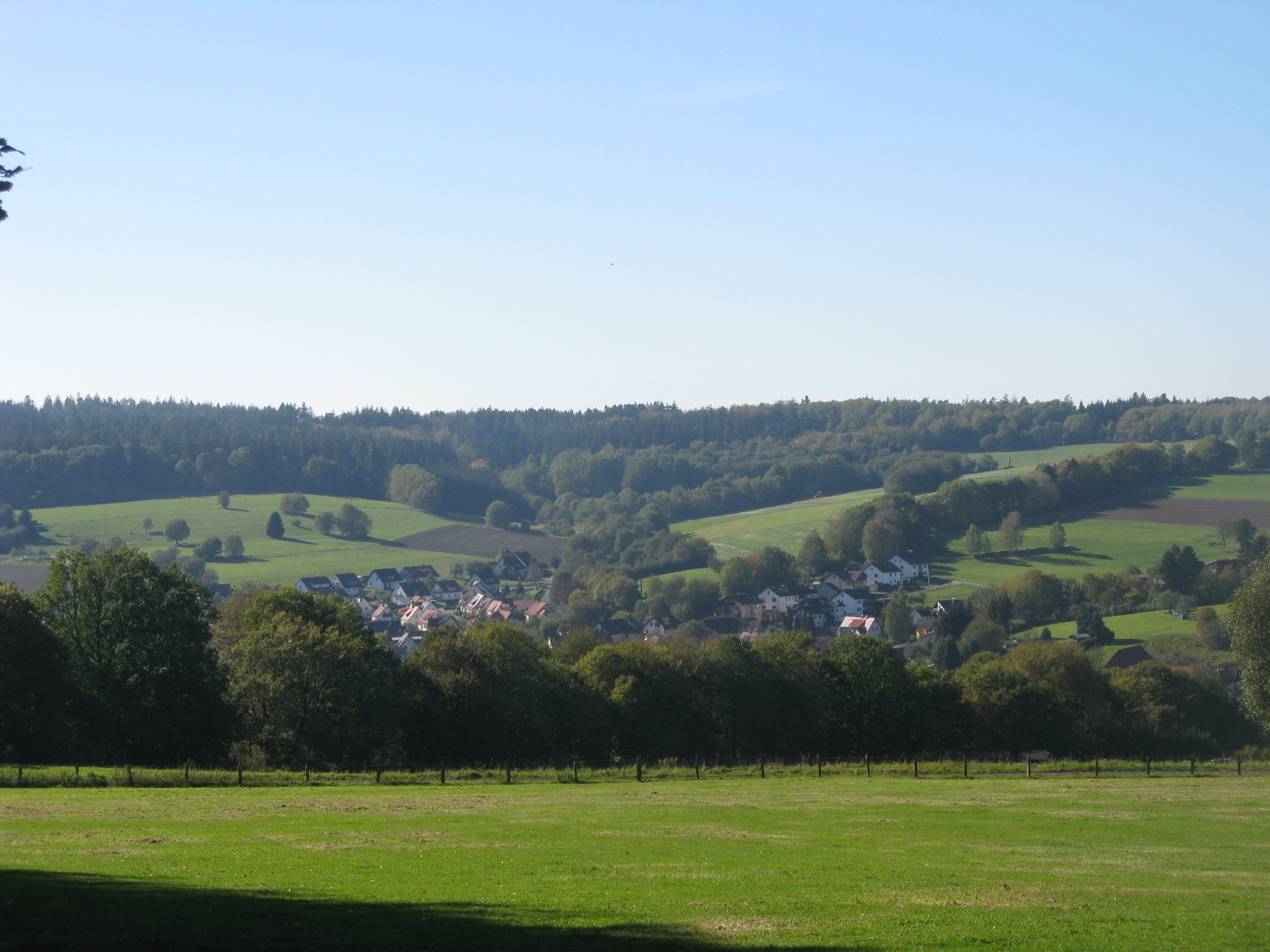

- Coat of arms

- Location of Wiesen within Aschaffenburg district
- Interactive map of Wiesen
- Location within Germany Location within Bavaria
- Coordinates: 50°07′N 09°22′E
- Country: Germany
- State: Bavaria
- Admin. region: Unterfranken
- District: Aschaffenburg
- Municipal assoc.: Schöllkrippen

Government
  - Mayor (2020–26): Willi Fleckenstein

Area
  - Total: 5.64 km^{2} (2.18 sq mi)
- Elevation: 400 m (1,300 ft)

Population (2025-12-31)
  - Total: 1,023
  - Density: 181/km^{2} (470/sq mi)
- Time zone: UTC+01:00 (CET)
  - Summer (DST): UTC+02:00 (CEST)
- Postal codes: 63831
- Dialling codes: 06096
- Vehicle registration: AB
- Website: www.gemeinde-wiesen.de

Wiesen (German pronunciation: [ˈviːzn̩]) is a municipality in the Aschaffenburg district in the Regierungsbezirk of Lower Franconia (Unterfranken) in Bavaria, Germany and a member of the Verwaltungsgemeinschaft (municipal association) of Schöllkrippen. It has around 1,000 inhabitants.

== Geography ==
=== Location ===
Gemeindeteile

The municipality lies in the Mittelgebirge Spessart and has one Gemarkung (traditional rural cadastral area), also named Wiesen.

== History ==
The former Electoral Mainz Amt was secularized at Prince Primate von Dalberg’s behest in 1803 and made part of his newly formed Principality of Aschaffenburg, with which the Amt passed in 1814 (by this time it had become a department of the Grand Duchy of Frankfurt) to the Kingdom of Bavaria. In the course of administrative reform in Bavaria, the current municipality came into being with the Gemeindeedikt ("Municipal Edict") of 1818.

== Population ==
Population of Wiesen
Year	Inhabitants
1970	1,053
1987	1,050
2000	1,152
2018	1,033
2022	1,058

== Economy ==
Municipal tax revenue amounted in 1999 to €588,000 (converted), of which net business taxes accounted for €172,000.

According to official statistics, there were 129 workers on the social welfare contribution roles working in producing businesses in 1998. In trade and transport this was 0. In other areas, 16 workers on the social welfare contribution rolls were employed, and 428 such workers worked from home. Four businesses were in processing. Three businesses were in construction, and furthermore, in 1999, there were five agricultural operations with a working area of 187 hectare, of which 186 hectare was meadowland.

== Governance ==
=== Town council ===
The council is made up of 13 council members, counting the part-time mayor.

	Dorfgemeinschaft	Total
2014	13	13 seats

=== Mayor ===
The mayor is Willi Fleckenstein (Dorfgemeinschaft).

=== Coat of arms ===
The municipality’s arms might be described thus: Gules in base a demi-wheel spoked of six argent, the rim to base, above which a stag’s attires Or reaching into chief, between them a scallop shell of the second, the hinge towards chief.

The municipality of Wiesen historically belonged to the Counts of Rieneck until they died out in 1559, whereupon it passed to the Archbishopric of Mainz, which built a hunting castle here in the Spessart. In the arms, the hart’s antlers and the half Wheel of Mainz recall the Electoral state to which the municipality belonged. The scallop is a symbol of Saint James. It refers to the parish church, which is consecrated to him. The tinctures gules and Or (red and gold) recall the Counts of Rieneck. They were closely associated with the municipality.

The municipality has borne the arms since 22 July 1985.

== Education ==
Wiesen has one Kindergarten.
