= Sommerkahl =

- Municipality
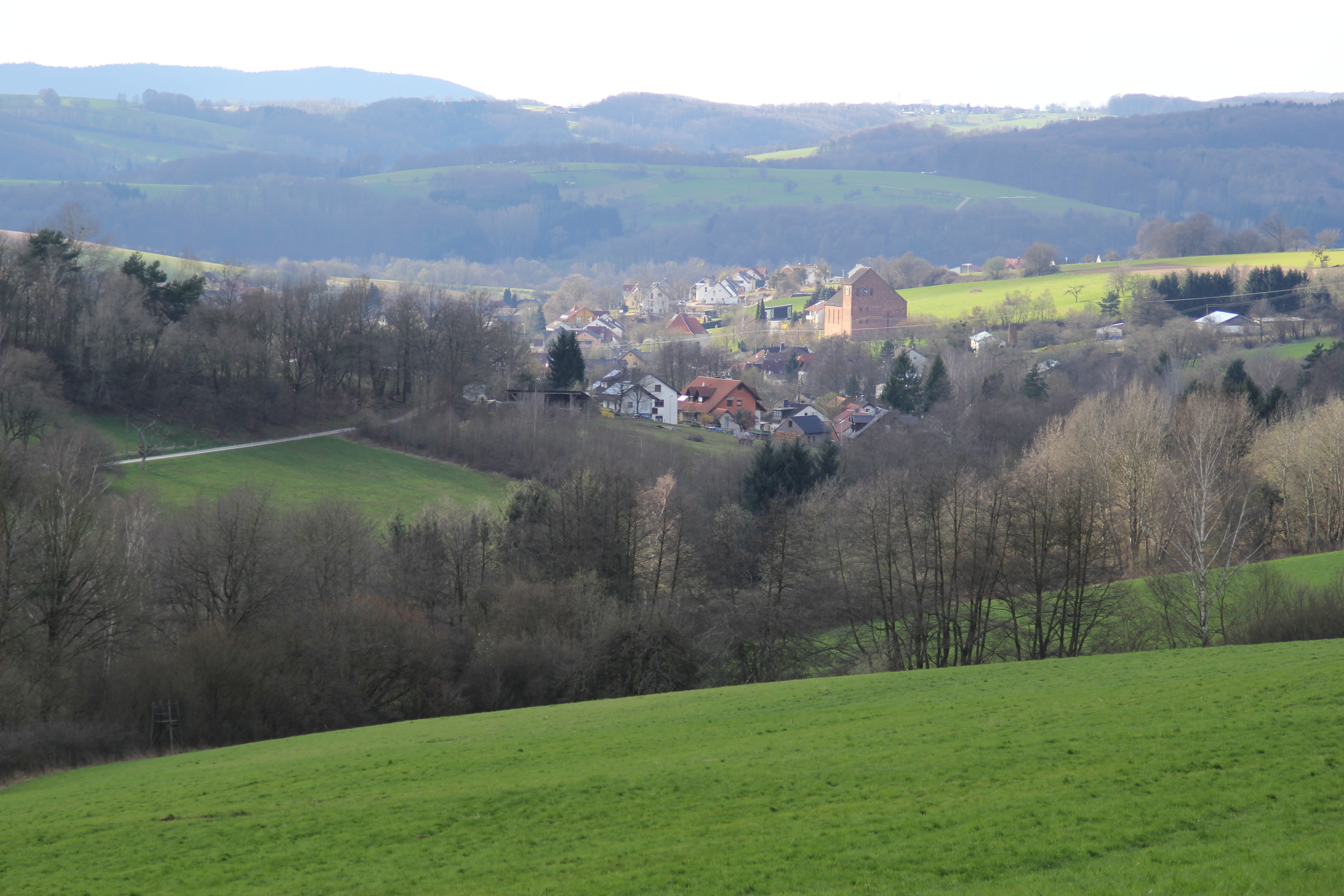
- Sommerkahl with parish church, view from the east

- Coat of arms

- Location of Sommerkahl within Aschaffenburg district
- Interactive map of Sommerkahl
- Location within Germany Location within Bavaria
- Coordinates: 50°04′N 9°16′E
- Country: Germany
- State: Bavaria
- Admin. region: Lower Franconia
- District: Aschaffenburg
- Municipal assoc.: Schöllkrippen
- Subdivisions: 2 Ortsteile

Government
  - Mayor (2020–26): Albin Schäfer (CSU)

Area
  - Total: 5.46 km^{2} (2.11 sq mi)
- Elevation: 226 m (741 ft)

Population (2025-12-31)
  - Total: 1,254
  - Density: 230/km^{2} (595/sq mi)
- Time zone: UTC+01:00 (CET)
  - Summer (DST): UTC+02:00 (CEST)
- Postal codes: 63825
- Dialling codes: 06024
- Vehicle registration: AB
- Website: www.gemeinde-sommerkahl.de

Sommerkahl is a municipality in the Aschaffenburg district in the Regierungsbezirk of Lower Franconia (Unterfranken) in Bavaria, Germany and a member of the Verwaltungsgemeinschaft (municipal association) of Schöllkrippen. It has a population of around 1,300 (2020).

== Geography ==
Sommerkahl is located in the Mittelgebirge Spessart, in the valley known as Kahlgrund, northeast of Aschaffenburg and not far from the border between the states of Bavaria and Hesse.

=== Subdivisions ===
Gemeindeteile

The municipality’s Gemeindeteile are Sommerkahl and Vormwald.

== History ==
Sommerkahl was first mentioned in 1184. The oldest part of the settlement is Untersommerkahl, around the Böhmerhof. Obersommerkahl and Vormwald followed in late medieval times.

In 1542, the Archbishop of Mainz, Albrecht granted a permit to mine ore in Sommerkahl. Kupferschiefer was mined for copper. The first period of mining here ended during the Thirty Years' War.

It was resumed in the second half of the 17th century. 42 out of a total 50 claims active at the time in the Spessart region were located in the upper Kahl valley, 11 of them in Sommerkahl.

From the late 19th century, the Grube Wilhelmine was active with copper being mined in several tunnels. Today, access is limited to a depth of around 23 meters, but when active, mining took place at up to 40 meters. Further mining took place at 60 meters and at least one pit reached 80 meters. These tunnels are now flooded. Boosted temporarily by a dearth of commodities during World War I, mining here ceased in 1922.

== Governance ==
=== Municipal council ===
The council is made up of 13 council members, counting the part-time mayor.

	CSU	SPD	FWG	Total
2002	6	4	3	13 seats

(as at municipal election held on 3 March 2002)

=== Coat of arms ===
The municipality’s coat of arms might be described in the following way: Gules a fess wavy at the nombril point above which a hammer and pick in saltire reversed argent, in base an oakleaf in fess Or, the stem towards dexter.

The two tools, the hammer and pick, stand for the miners who worked at copper and iron mining, industries confirmed as having existed in the municipal area by 1542. The mining works, however, were shut down in 1922, and the shutdown is symbolized by the tools being upside down (“reversed”; this charge, quite common in German mining towns’ arms, is usually shown with the tools’ heads uppermost). The wavy fess (horizontal stripe) stands for the municipality’s location on the river Kahl. The oakleaf refers to the Spessart, which is thickly wooded with oaks. Sommerkahl was an Electoral Mainz holding from 982 to 1803; the tinctures gules and argent (red and silver) were Mainz’s colours.

The arms were conferred on 7 February 1972.

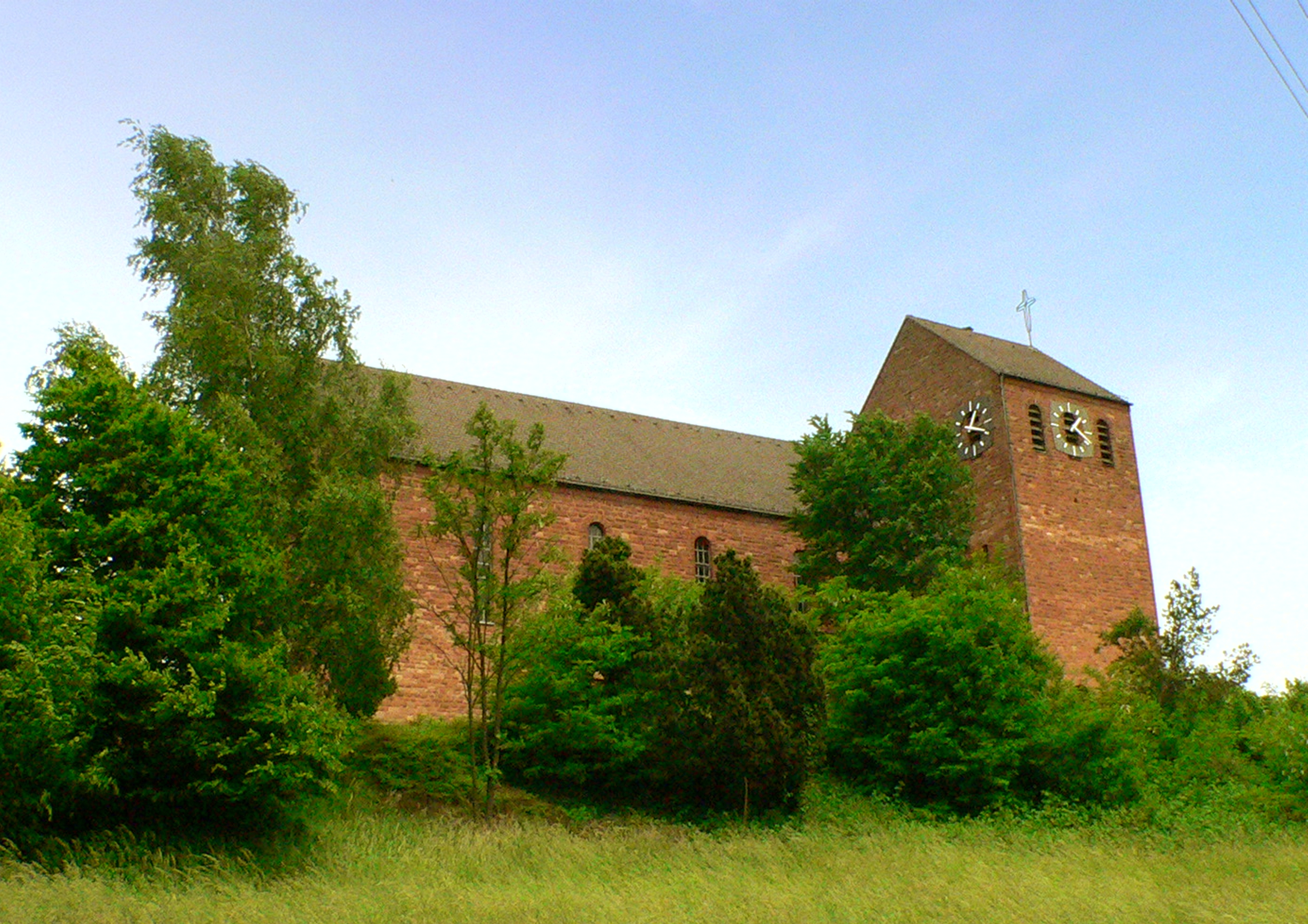
Parish church

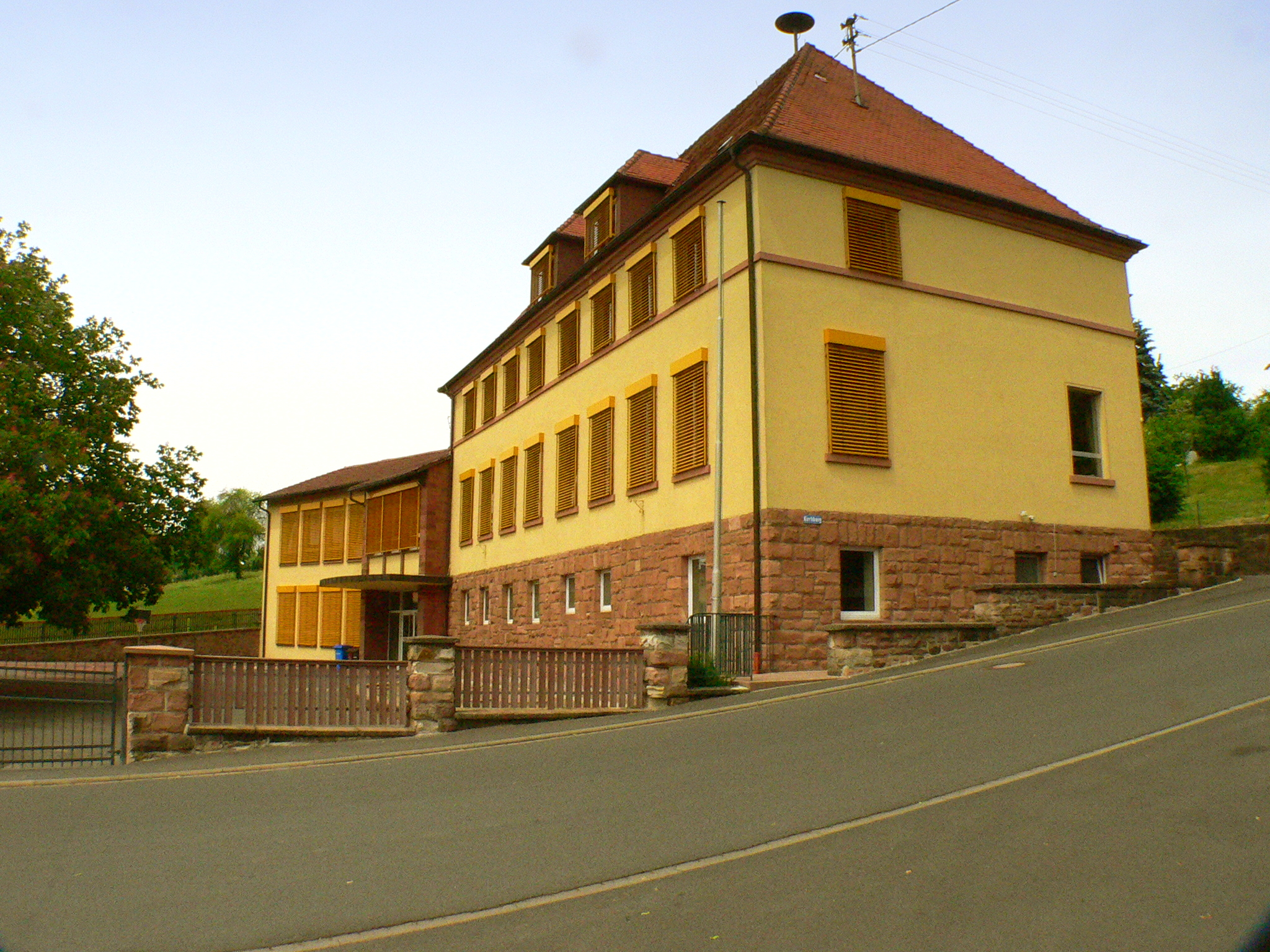
Town hall

== Attractions ==
- Catholic parish church
- Town hall
- Grube Wilhelmine, a former coppermine. The mine may be visited upon notification.

== Notable people ==
- Herbert Stenger (1948-2014), a champion hillclimber
- Heiko Westermann (b. 1983), German national footballer who most recently played for Hamburger SV
