= Aschaffenburg (district) =

Coordinates: 50°05′N 9°10′E

- District
- Flag Coat of arms
- Country: Germany
- State: Bavaria
- Adm. region: Lower Franconia
- Capital: Aschaffenburg (extraterritorial)

Government
  - District admin.: Alexander Legler (CSU)

Area
  - Total: 699 km^{2} (270 sq mi)

Population (31 December 2025)
  - Total: 170,120
  - Density: 243/km^{2} (630/sq mi)
- Time zone: UTC+01:00 (CET)
  - Summer (DST): UTC+02:00 (CEST)
- Vehicle registration: AB, ALZ
- Website: www.landkreis-aschaffenburg.de

Aschaffenburg (Low Franconian: Aschebersch) is a Landkreis (district) in Bavaria, Germany. It is bounded by (from the west and clockwise) the districts of Darmstadt-Dieburg, Offenbach, Main-Kinzig (all in the state of Hesse), the districts Main-Spessart and Miltenberg, and the City of Aschaffenburg.

== History ==
The history of Aschaffenburg goes back as far as the year 957. Initially a Roman settlement, it came under the authority of the electors of Mainz in 982 and was chartered in 1173. Remains of Roman settlements were found on the river Main. There was a Roman military camp in today's municipality of Stockstadt am Main. After the Roman retreat, the region became subject to Alemanni and Franks before becoming a part of the Electorate of Mainz. While the banks of the Main were populated all these centuries, the hills of the Spessart were virtually unsettled until the 13th century.

The districts of Aschaffenburg and Alzenau were established in 1862, half a century after the state of Bavaria had annexed the region. These districts were merged in 1972 to form the present district.

== Geography ==
The district is located in the extreme northwest of Bavaria and bounded by Hesse on two sides. The Main river forms the western border, though southwest of the town of Aschaffenburg, parts on the western river banks are incorporated into the district. The south and east of the district extends into the Mittelgebirge Spessart.

The town of Aschaffenburg is not included in the district ( kreisfrei ), but is nonetheless its administrative seat.

The geographic centre of the European Union was located in the District of Aschaffenburg from 2013 to 2020.

== Economy ==
In 2017 (latest data available), the GDP per inhabitant was €33,109. This places the district 60th out of 96 districts (rural and urban) in Bavaria (overall average: €46,698).

== Coat of arms ==
The coat of arms displays:

- an acorn symbolising the Spessart hills and their dense forests
- the wheel of the electorate of Mainz
- the blue rings of the Echter family, which was a noble family possessing substantial holdings of land in the region

== Towns and municipalities ==
Clickable map of towns and municipalities in the district

Towns:

- Alzenau

Märkte:

- Goldbach
- Großostheim
- Hösbach
- Mömbris
- Stockstadt am Main

Municipalities:

- Bessenbach
- Geiselbach
- Glattbach
- Haibach
- Johannesberg
- Kahl am Main
- Karlstein am Main
- Kleinostheim
- Laufach
- Mainaschaff
- Rothenbuch
- Sailauf
- Waldaschaff
- Weibersbrunn

Verwaltungsgemeinschaften
1. Heigenbrücken; 1. Heigenbrücken^{1}; 2. Heinrichsthal	2. Mespelbrunn; 1. Dammbach; 2. Heimbuchenthal^{1}; 3. Mespelbrunn	3. Schöllkrippen; 1. Blankenbach; 2. Kleinkahl; 3. Krombach; 4. Schöllkrippen^{1,2}; 5. Sommerkahl; 6. Westerngrund; 7. Wiesen
^{1}seat of the Verwaltungsgemeinschaft; ^{2}Markt
