= Krombach, Bavaria =

Krombach
- Municipality
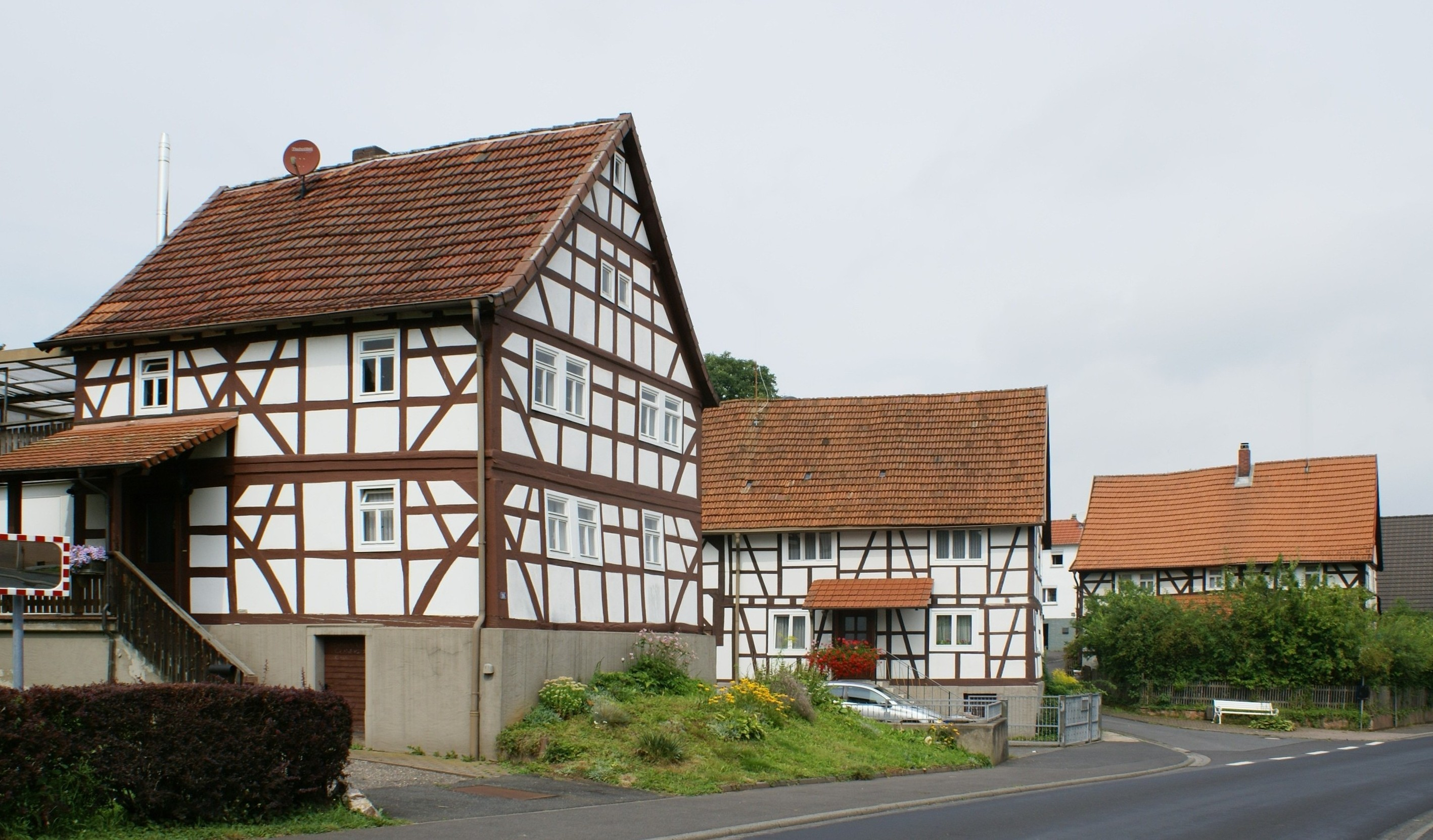
- Fachwerkhäuser in Krombach

- Coat of arms

- Location of Krombach within Aschaffenburg district
- Interactive map of Krombach
- Location within Germany Location within Bavaria
- Coordinates: 50°05′N 09°13′E
- Country: Germany
- State: Bavaria
- Admin. region: Unterfranken
- District: Aschaffenburg
- Municipal assoc.: Schöllkrippen

Government
  - Mayor (2020–26): Peter Seitz

Area
  - Total: 10.65 km^{2} (4.11 sq mi)
- Elevation: 240 m (790 ft)

Population (2025-12-31)
  - Total: 2,011
  - Density: 188.8/km^{2} (489.1/sq mi)
- Time zone: UTC+01:00 (CET)
  - Summer (DST): UTC+02:00 (CEST)
- Postal codes: 63829
- Dialling codes: 06024
- Vehicle registration: AB
- Website: www.gemeinde-krombach.de

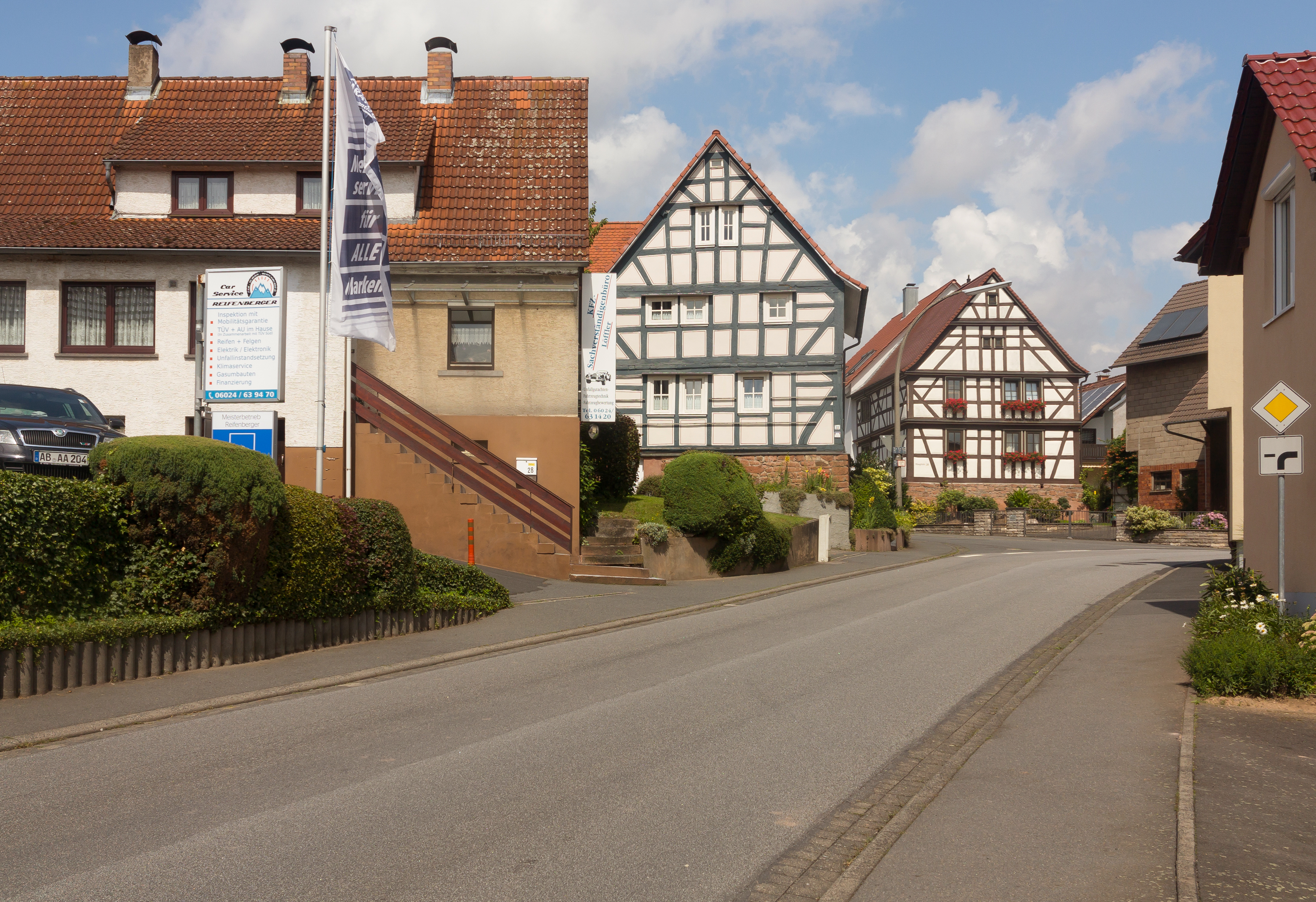
Krombach, view to the main street

Krombach is a municipality in the Aschaffenburg district in the Regierungsbezirk of Lower Franconia (Unterfranken) in Bavaria, Germany and a member of the Verwaltungsgemeinschaft (Administrative Community) of Schöllkrippen.

== Geography ==
=== Location ===
Gemeindeteile

The municipality lies in the Bavarian Lower Main (Bayerischer Untermain). It has only one Gemarkung (traditional rural cadastral area), also called Krombach.

== History ==
The hegemony of the Counts of Schönborn was mediatized in 1806 at the behest of the Principality of Aschaffenburg, with which it passed in 1814 (by this time it had become a department of the Grand Duchy of Frankfurt) to Bavaria. In the course of administrative reform in Bavaria, the current municipality came into being with the Gemeindeedikt (“Municipal Edict”) of 1818. The hereditary court at Krombach was abolished in 1849.

== Population development ==
Year	Inhabitants
1970	1,501
1987	1,772
2000	2,178
2024	2,048
2025	2,017

== Politics ==
=== Municipal council ===
The council is made up of 15 council members, counting the part-time mayor.

	CSU	SPD	Independents	Total
2020	4	2	8	14 seats
2002	11	3	1	15 seats

=== Mayors ===
The mayor is Peter Seitz, elected in 2014 and re-elected in 2020.

=== Coat of arms ===
The coat of arms depicts a gold lion with a double tail wearing a blue crown. Above are two gold bars and below silver points on a red background.

The official German blazon reads: Unter dreimal von Rot und Gold geteiltem Schildhaupt in Rot über drei silberne Spitzen schreitend ein blau gekrönter goldener Löwe mit Doppelschweif.

==== Armorial history ====
The municipality of Krombach was for the most part under the ownership of the Counts of Rieneck, and it was the seat of a court. The Counts died out in 1559 and the municipality's ownership passed to the Archbishopric of Mainz. In 1666, the court was acquired by the family of the Barons – later Counts – of Schönborn. The municipality became the hub of the Counts’ holdings in the upper Kahl valley. The lion, drawn from the Counts’ arms, recalls the time when they held sway. The barry (that is, horizontally striped) chief was taken from the arms borne by the earlier lords, the Counts of Rieneck. The tinctures gules and argent (red and silver) stem from the arms borne by Electoral Mainz, to which the municipality also once belonged.

The municipality has borne the arms since 8 June 1967.

=== Education ===
As of 2025, the municipality includes four elementary schools, one primary school, and one middle school. There is also an Adult Education Center and library.

== Twin towns – sister cities ==
Krombach is twinned with:

- Soliers, France, since 1996
