= Kahlgrund =

Coordinates: 50°04′09″N 9°10′03″E

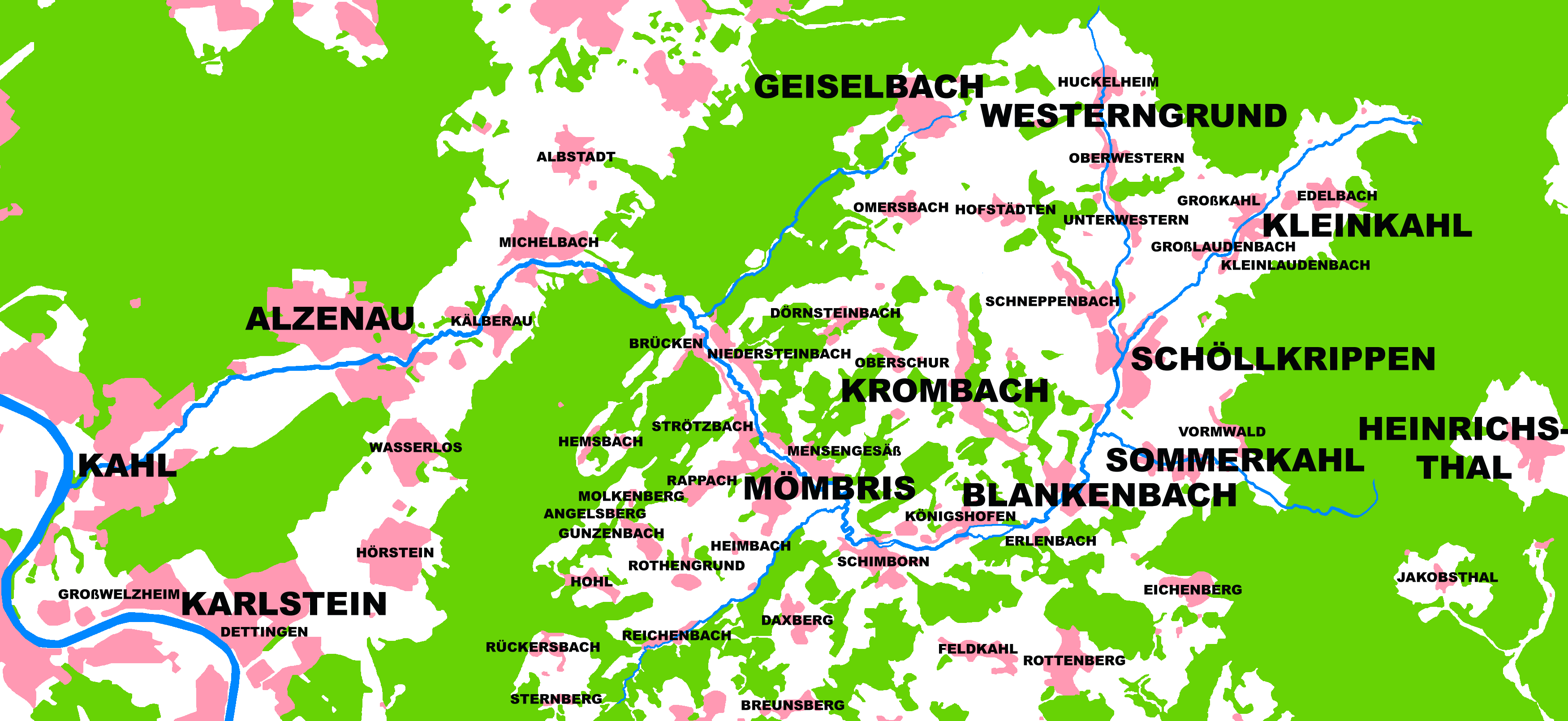
Villages in the Kahlgrund

The Kahlgrund (German pronunciation: [ˈkaːlɡʁʊnt]) is an area in the northern Spessart in Lower Franconia, Bavaria, Germany, following the valley of the river Kahl. It roughly corresponds to the former district of Alzenau, which was merged into the district of Aschaffenburg in 1972. A small part of the area is part of the Main-Kinzig-Kreis, Hesse.
