= Rottendorf station =

Railway station in Germany

Rottendorf
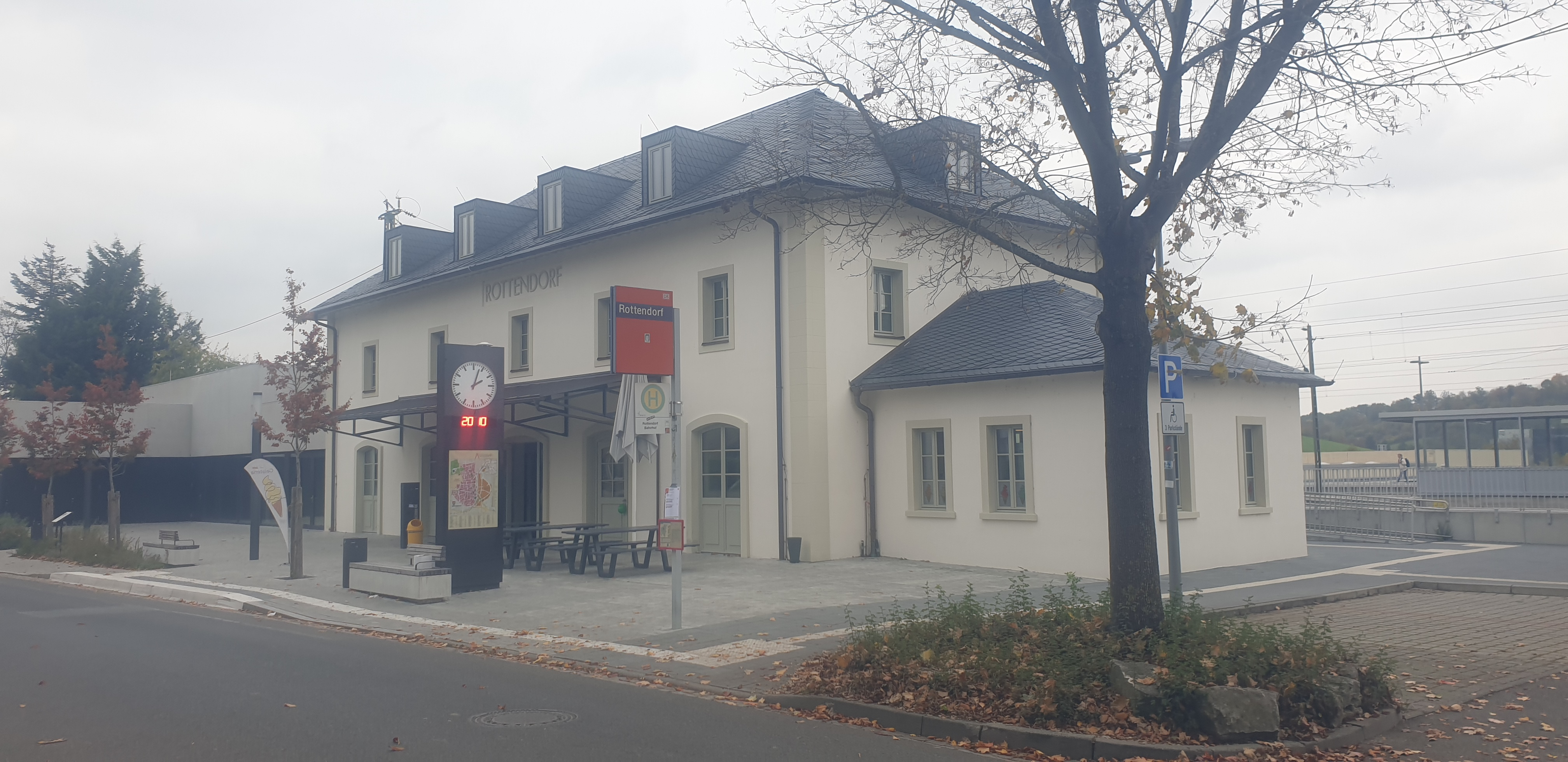
- Entrance building in 2024

General information
- Location: Bahnhofstraße 4; 97228 Rottendorf; Bavaria; Germany
- Coordinates: 49°47′33″N 10°01′44″E
- System: Bf
- Owner: Deutsche Bahn
- Operator: DB Netz; DB Station&Service
- Lines: Nuremberg–Würzburg railway (KBS 805); Bamberg–Rottendorf railway (KBS 810)
- Platforms: 2 island platforms 1 side platform
- Tracks: 7
- Train operators: DB Regio Bayern
- Connections: 560 8101 8108

Other information
- Station code: 5400
- DS100 code: NRTD
- IBNR: 8005198
- Category: 4
- Fare zone: VVM: A/241 and 260
- Website: www.bahnhof.de

Services
Preceding station	DB Regio Bayern	Following station
Würzburg Hbf Terminus	RE 10	Dettelbach Bahnhof towards Nürnberg Hbf
Würzburg Hbf towards Schlüchtern	RB 53	Seligenstadt (b Würzburg) towards Bamberg
Location
- Location within Bavaria Location within Germany Location within Europe

Rottendorf station is a railway station in the municipality of Rottendorf, located in the Würzburg district in Bavaria, Germany.
