= Dettelbach Bahnhof =

Railway station in Germany

General information
- Location: Am Bahnhof; 97337 Dettelbach; Bavaria; Germany
- Coordinates: 49°47′15″N 10°05′27″E
- Owner: Deutsche Bahn
- Operator: DB Netz; DB Station&Service
- Lines: Nuremberg–Würzburg railway (KBS 805); Dettelbach Bahnhof–Dettelbach Stadt Railway
- Platforms: 2 side platforms
- Tracks: 3
- Train operators: DB Regio Bayern
- Connections: 8108

Other information
- Station code: 1181
- DS100 code: NDEB
- IBNR: 8001421
- Category: 6
- Fare zone: NVM: A/403; VGN: 1934 (NVM transitional zone)
- Website: www.bahnhof.de

Services
Preceding station	DB Regio Bayern	Following station
Rottendorf towards Würzburg Hbf	RE 10	Buchbrunn-Mainstockheim towards Nürnberg Hbf
Location
- Location within Bavaria Location within Germany Location within Europe

Dettelbach Bahnhof is a railway station in the municipality of Dettelbach, located in the Kitzingen district in Bavaria, Germany.

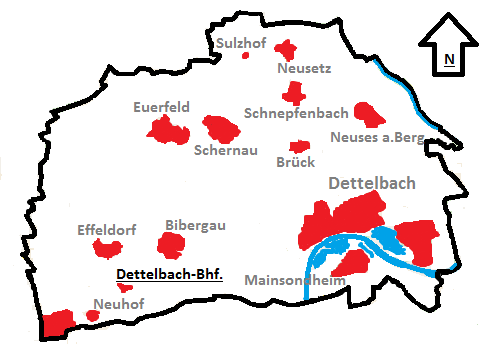
Location of Dettelbach Bahnhof (bold) in the Dettelbach municipal area
