= Würzburg Hauptbahnhof =

Railway station for Würzburg, Germany

Würzburg Hbf
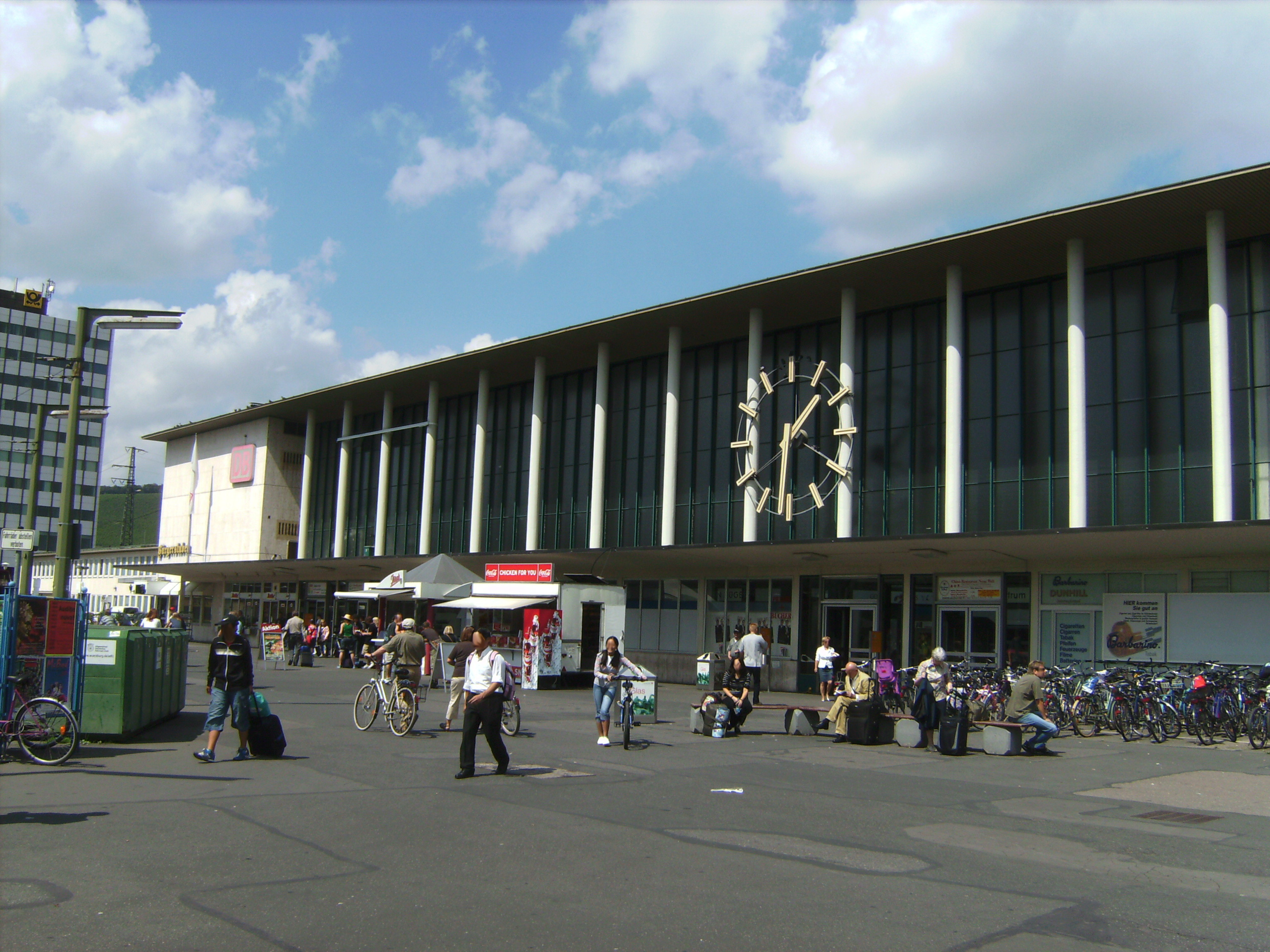

General information
- Location: Bahnhofplatz 4, Würzburg, Bavaria; Germany
- Coordinates: 49°48′05″N 9°56′08″E
- Elevation: 181 m (594 ft)
- Owner: Deutsche Bahn
- Operator: DB Station&Service
- Lines: Würzburg–Hannover (KBS 351); Würzburg–Stuttgart (KBS 780); Würzburg–Aschaffenburg (KBS 800); Würzburg–Nuremberg (KBS 805); Würzburg–Treuchtlingen (KBS 920)
- Platforms: 11

Construction
- Accessible: Yes

Other information
- Station code: 6945
- DS100 code: NWH
- IBNR: 8000260
- Category: 2
- Fare zone: NVM: A/100; VRN: 640 (NVM transitional zone)
- Website: www.bahnhof.de; stationsdatenbank.de

History
- Opened: 1 June 1854
Services
Preceding station	DB Fernverkehr	Following station
Aschaffenburg Hbf towards Hamburg-Altona	ICE 1 Sprinter	Nürnberg Hbf towards Passau Hbf
Kassel-Wilhelmshöhe One-way operation	ICE 13	Heilbronn towards Berlin Ostbahnhof
Fulda towards Hamburg-Altona	ICE 24	Ansbach towards Innsbruck Hbf or Schwarzach-St.Veit
Fulda towards Hamburg-Altona	ICE 25	Nürnberg Hbf towards München Hbf
Aschaffenburg Hbf towards Dortmund Hbf or Essen Hbf	ICE 41	Nürnberg Hbf towards München Hbf
Hanau Hbf towards Dortmund Hbf	ICE 91	Nürnberg Hbf towards Wien Hbf
Fulda towards Hamburg-Altona	ICE 91	Nürnberg Hbf towards Wien Hbf
Preceding station	ÖBB	Following station
Köln Messe/Deutz towards Amsterdam Centraal	Nightjet	Nürnberg Hbf towards Innsbruck Hbf or Wien Hbf
Göttingen towards Hamburg-Altona	Nightjet	Nürnberg Hbf towards Innsbruck Hbf or Wien Hbf
Terminus	Nightjet	Rottendorf towards Innsbruck Hbf or Wien Hbf
Preceding station	DB Regio Bayern	Following station
Terminus	RE 10	Rottendorf towards Nürnberg Hbf
Terminus	RE 20	Schweinfurt Hbf towards Nürnberg Hbf
Retzbach-Zellingen towards Frankfurt (Main) Hbf	RE 54	Schweinfurt Hbf towards Bamberg
Retzbach-Zellingen towards Frankfurt (Main) Hbf	RE 55	Terminus
Würzburg-Zell towards Schlüchtern	RB 53	Terminus
Würzburg-Zell towards Aschaffenburg Hbf	RB 79	Terminus
Terminus	RB 80	Würzburg Süd towards Marktbreit
Terminus	RB 85	Würzburg Süd towards Osterburken
Preceding station	DB Regio Südost	Following station
Terminus	RE 7	Schweinfurt Hbf towards Erfurt Hbf
Terminus	RE 57	Schweinfurt Hbf towards Bad Kissingen
Preceding station		Following station
Terminus	RE 8	Lauda towards Stuttgart Hbf
Terminus	RB 8	Würzburg Süd towards Lauda
Preceding station		Following station
Terminus	RE 80	Würzburg Süd towards München Hbf
Location

Würzburg Hauptbahnhof is a railway station for the city of Würzburg in the German state of Bavaria. It was opened in 1864 to the north of the inner city as a replacement for the former Ludwigsbahnhof (Ludwig's station) in the city centre, the capacity of which had been exhausted by the dramatic increase of rail traffic. Even today, Würzburg station is one of the major stations in Bavaria, since it lies at the intersection of several heavily used rail corridors. In particular, the routes in the north–south direction from Hamburg and Bremen to Munich as well as in west–east direction from the Rhine-Ruhr and Rhine-Main to Nuremberg and Vienna. Apart from Aschaffenburg Hauptbahnhof, Würzburg is the only station in Lower Franconia to be served by Intercity-Express services. With its combination of rail, tram and bus services, the station is the main hub for public transport in the city and the district of Würzburg.

== History ==
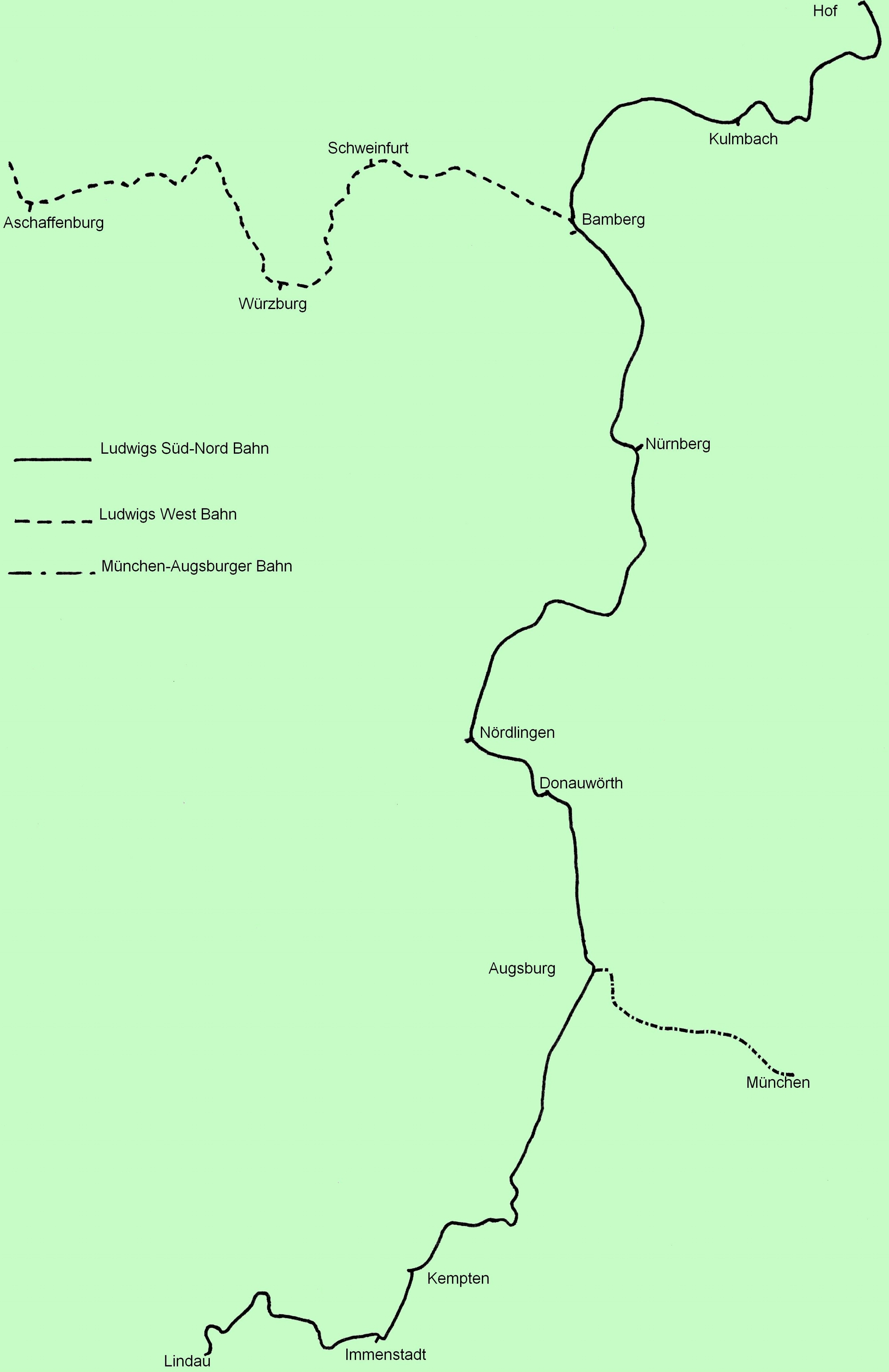
The first Bavarian state railways, with the Ludwig Western Railway in the north connecting Würzburg to the rail network

The city of Würzburg was the capital of the Grand Duchy of Würzburg under Ferdinand III until 1814. It was then part of the territories in Franconia that were granted to the Kingdom of Bavaria by the Congress of Vienna in compensation for the loss of the Tyrol and that part of Palatinate that was east of the Rhine to Baden. Because of its remoteness within Bavaria, Würzburg was not connected by the Ludwig South-North Railway, which crossed the entire kingdom. At the urging of the Bavarian parliament, the city was connected to the railway network by the second state railway, the Ludwig Western Railway only a few years later. Construction work began in 1852 and the 43-kilometre (27 mi)-long third stage from Schweinfurt to Würzburg (now part of the Bamberg–Rottendorf railway) of the 206 km (128 mi)-long line was opened on 1 June 1854. In the fourth and final stage, the line was opened to the Bavarian border in Kahl am Main via Gemünden am Main and Aschaffenburg on 1 October 1854 (now part of the Main–Spessart railway).

=== The first station of 1852: the Ludwig station ===
The first Würzburg station was named the Ludwigsbahnhof (Ludwig station) after King Ludwig I. At the request of the Ministry of War, the station was built inside the city walls, despite the higher land acquisition costs, at the exact location of the Mainfranken Theater today. This however meant, due to the already dense development, that it was possible to build only a terminal station. The area available for the station was about 400 metres (1,312 ft) long and between 50 and 100 metres (164 and 328 ft) wide and next to the station building and the train shed there was also a roundhouse and a carriage shed. It also included a workshop for the maintenance of rail vehicles and a freight warehouse. A second building was added, which was connected by tracks that had to be built on embankments that were up to five metres high due to the unevenness of the ground and as a result the building was higher than the surrounding streets.

It was designed in the Renaissance Revival style by the royal architect Gottfried von Neureuther, who designed many station buildings of the Royal Bavarian State Railways and described the Würzburg station as one of the most difficult buildings on the Ludwig Western Railway. The station building was a two-storey building, the front of which faced west to Theaterstraße, where a forecourt was designed as a formal entrance to the city. The slightly elevated ground floor, as a result of the high position of the tracks, was clad with limestone and sandstone and included, among other things, waiting rooms and a restaurant. A 100-metre (328 ft)-long and 24-metre (79 ft)-wide platform area adjoined the station building to the east. Under the 13-metre (43 ft)-high roof there were a track for passenger and freight trains and two bypass tracks. Large problems were experienced with the introduction of the tracks to the station area, as only two tracks ran through the city walls; these branched immediately after crossing the moat towards Schweinfurt and Gemünden. Sets of points had to be inserted on the bridge over the moat so that trains could be separated so that freight trains could run to the northern part of the station and passenger trains run to the southern part of the station. This limited the increase in capacity significantly, particularly for freight traffic.

=== Relocation of the station ===
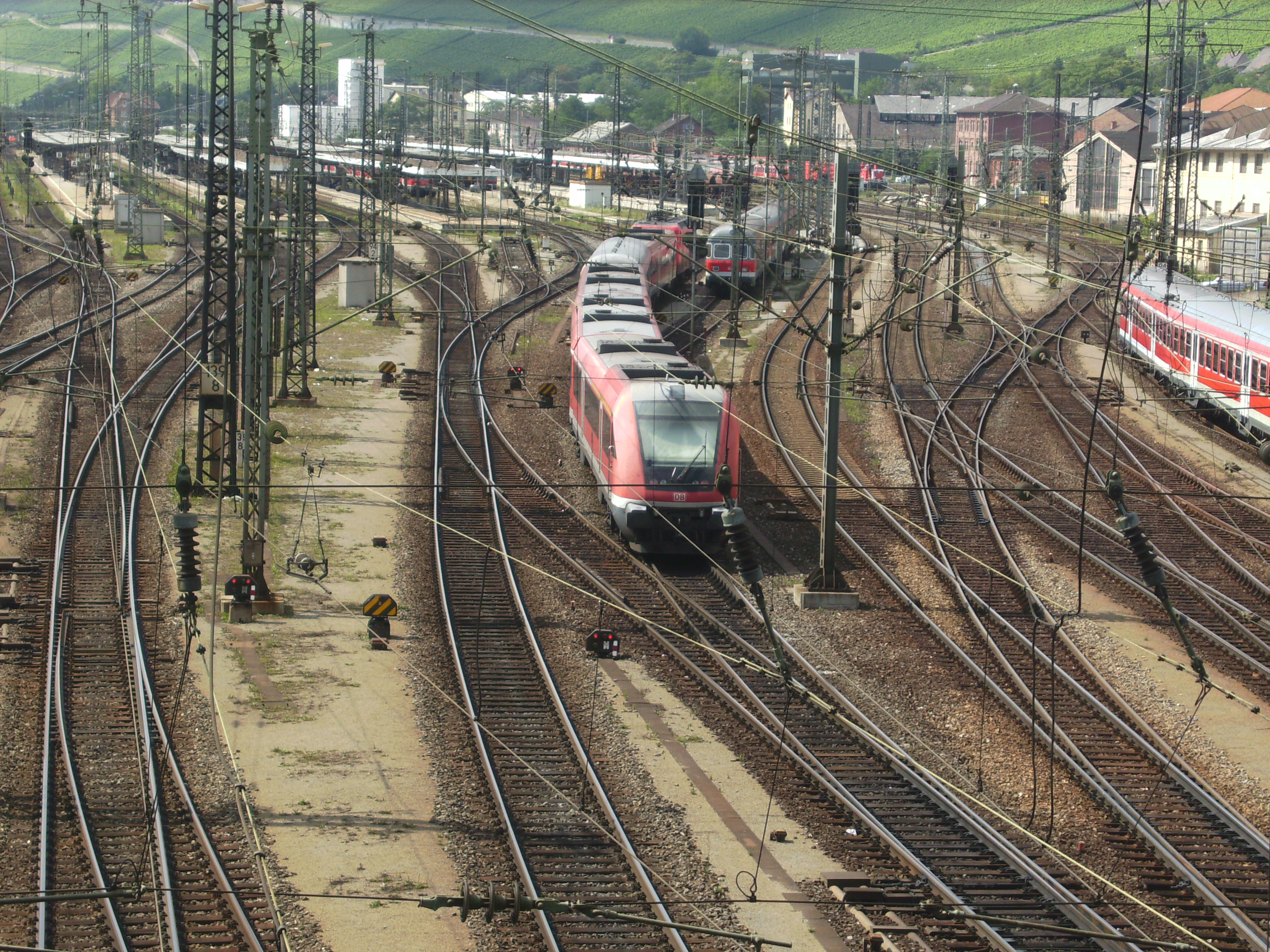
A regional train on the eastern approaches

In subsequent years the railways grew steadily. Although a lack of resources prevented rapid economic growth, as a result of the construction of new tracks, Würzburg became a railway junction. First, in 1861 construction started on a nearly 90-kilometre (56 mi)-long link between Würzburg and Ansbach station, where it connected with a line that had been built in 1859 by the town of Ansbach to connect with the Ludwig South-North Railway in Gunzenhausen. This line (which is now part of the Treuchtlingen–Würzburg railway) was completed in 1864, giving Würzburg a shorter connection to the major cities of Augsburg and Munich. Just a year later, a direct link was opened between Rottendorf and Fürth (now part of the Nuremberg–Würzburg railway), creating a much shorter than the line via Bamberg and relegating the Ludwig Western Railway to a minor role. At the same time the common section with the old route to Bamberg between Würzburg and Rottendorf was duplicated. In 1866, the Baden Odenwald Railway (Odenwaldbahn) was completed. It was last railway opened to Würzburg until the late 20th century. It was built mainly at the request of Bavaria, to connect the then Bavarian Rhenish Palatinate to its own railway network and ran from Würzburg via Osterburken and Mosbach to Heidelberg.

==== The new station outside the inner city ====
The terminus could no longer absorb the traffic of the additional lines. An extension of the facilities that were tight from the start was not possible due to the density of buildings in the inner city. To provide greater capacity for passenger services, it was planned initially to shift freight and shunting to a separate location. Against the backdrop of the ever-growing rail traffic and given the operational benefits of a through station, the decision was taken in 1862 to build a new station to the north of the city beneath the Schalksberg (hill) and near the famous Würzburger Stein vineyard. At this time the area was only sparsely populated and there was enough space available for a large station yard and a through station. The construction of the station was accompanied by an extensive reorganisation of the road network. The mainly narrow and winding streets of the town centre were greatly improved by the widening of existing streets and the building of the central Schönbornstraße. The newly created Kaiserstraße connected the outlying station complex and the town. A new district was then established in the immediate vicinity of the station and in place of the former city wall a ring of parks in the English style was created. The Julius Maximilian University of Würzburg and imposing Gründerzeit villas were built between the station and the banks of the Main river. In addition, a separate district for railway employees was built to the northeast of the station.

The architect Friedrich Bürklein was commissioned for the construction of the station building. He had been responsible for the construction of München Hauptbahnhof and the stations in Augsburg, Bamberg, Nördlingen, Nuremberg and Bad Kissingen. Construction started in 1863 and it was completed in 1869.

The station building was an imposing building, which consisted of a two-story central hall, which was bounded by two raised side wings. On the ground floor the entire front of the central hall was composed of arcade-like archways, which gave access to the inside of the station. There were, in addition to a salon for the king, the usual facilities of a station at the time, such as waiting rooms for four classes, two restaurants, ticketing and baggage counter and several administrative offices. The rooms on the upper floor were used as apartments for the staff. The platforms were one level above the street level as they were built on an embankment. Therefore, in the middle of the entrance building, there was a staircase to the concourse supported by 14 marble columns.

The railway tracks were built over a very large area. Sidings, locomotive and carriage maintenance shops and warehouses were built to the north of the platform area. To the east there were the facilities of the Grand Duchy of Baden State Railway, which operated the Odenwald Railway towards Heidelberg, as it ran through Bavaria for only about 20 kilometres (12 mi).

==== Destruction during World War II and reconstruction ====
Until shortly before the end of the Second World War people still living in Würzburg had the illusion that the city would be spared an air raid because no significant industry was located in the city and it had three hospitals. However, Würzburg had great importance for rail transport, the logistical backbone of German armaments. On 23 February 1945, during an air strike of the United States Army Air Force, which was actually directed at Bayreuth, a large part of the station area was destroyed or severely degraded by about 200 bombs. Although the only threat from Würzburg for the Allies had been eliminated and another attack seemed unlikely, starting on the evening of 16 March 1945 in England, about 230 four-engined Avro Lancaster bombers of the Royal Air Force flew to Würzburg. In this destruction, considered one of the most devastating in the war, about 5,000 people lost their lives. In addition, 90 percent of the buildings in the inner city were damaged, which made Würzburg one of the most devastated cities of World War II. The city, which had often been called the "pearl of the baroque", was reduced to a pile of rubble within 19 minutes. Following the destruction on 23 February of the station built by Friedrich Bürklein, the station building of the Ludwig station was now also destroyed; since the closing of railway operations it had been used as a school.

The ruins of the Ludwig station were completely removed up to the early 1960s and today's Mainfranken Theater Würzburg was built in its place. Shortly after the war work began on the reconstruction of the railway facilities. Since the station had been almost completely destroyed, the then Deutsche Bundesbahn and the responsible architect, Bundesbahn inspector Hans Kern decided against a reconstruction of the building and to build a new building. It was built in the unadorned style of 1950s modernism. The wide front was completely glazed and concrete pillars supported the slightly overhanging roof. Construction of the entrance hall began in 1952 and it was opened on 2 October 1954 at the conclusion of the electrification of the Fürth–Würzburg line. After further stages of construction, the building was completed in 1961. Inside there was a large entrance hall, which among other things housed a ticket office and various shops. The northern side of the hall was adorned by an attached stone mosaic of the Eichstätt artist Alois Wünsche-Mitterecker that had a cross-sectional image of a class 44 steam locomotive at its original size. As repeated vibrations caused by departing trains broke part of the wall panelling, the mosaic was removed in 1958 and installed in the Nuremberg Transport Museum.

==== The division of Germany and recent development since the 1980s ====
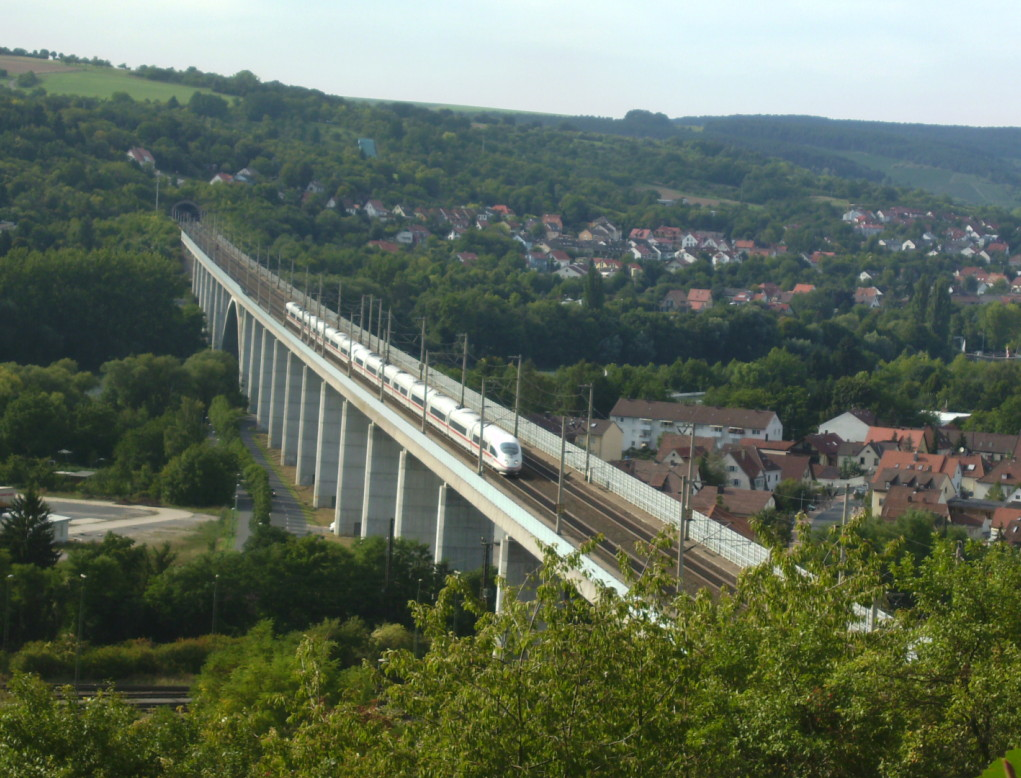
Just five kilometers from Würzburg Hauptbahnhof, on the Main Viaduct, Veitshöchheim, an ICE 3 train reaches 200 km/h

Würzburg Hauptbahnhof has a central location in Germany and was always a major hub for rail transport, but after the division of Germany its importance increased again. While rail traffic between the north and the southeast of the country had previously been distributed over several routes, now the lines through the Thuringian Forest, the Franconian Forest and the Vogtland were truncated. All the trains that had to be operated along the Inner German border, including the routes to Munich via Würzburg and Nuremberg caused a considerable increase in the workload for Würzburg.

In the timetable of 1979/80, 300 passenger, 250 freight trains and 100 other trains operated through Würzburg station on weekdays. About 60 passenger and 50 freight trains were shunted at the station.

The high utilisation of the access routes led to the construction of two new lines for high-speed traffic (Mannheim–Stuttgart and Hanover–Würzburg) in order to clear the old lines of express trains. During the 1991 timetable, the first Intercity-Express sets served Würzburg, still under the "Intercity" name. In May 1992, Würzburg became an ICE stop with the establishment of the Hamburg–Würzburg–Munich ICE service.

== The station today ==
=== Infrastructure ===
==== Entrance building ====
Since the construction of the new station building, it has been changed only slightly since its completion so that the basic structure of the original design is still preserved almost completely. In place of the wall paintings that have been removed there are now billboards. The former ticket office was converted into a travel center that was modified in the 1990s to fit the new corporate design of Deutsche Bahn. In addition, the entrance building now housed a baggage room, a "ServicePoint", a food shop, a book shop and a small kiosk for tobacco products and magazines. In the summer of 2006, two new sales pavilions were established for this purpose and an older bakery was removed and the ServicePoint had to be moved to the side of the hall. At the eastern end there was an office of the Bahnhofsmission charity, which provides assistance to travellers and the homeless; until the beginning of 2008, this has since been housed in the west wing of the building. Before the start of the platform underpass there is a toilet facility, which has been leased to a private operator since 2006. There have been repeated complaints in recent years regarding its cleanliness and hygiene to Deutsche Bahn, which notes, however, that a comprehensive renovation of the facility will be undertaken during the modernisation of the whole building. The restaurant Bürgerstuben was housed in the western part of the building until June 2007. Its operation was terminated in October 2006 by the operator, SSP Deutschland, the successor to Deutsche Bahn's own catering operation Mitropa, in preparation for the planned station modernisation as part of the "arcades project" (Arcaden-Projekt, see below). Since Deutsche Bahn reversed the termination of the operation of the restaurant after the collapse of the arcades project, the reconstructed restaurant has been staffed by a new operator. On the top floor in the western part of the building there is a conference centre and in the eastern part there are business premises. In mid-2007, work started on the establishment of a DB Lounge for first-class travellers and bahn.comfort (BahnCard) customers, which was forecast for completion in 2011.

As part of the economic stimulus package, Deutsche Bahn is renovating the station building with energy-related measures.

==== Platforms and railway tracks ====
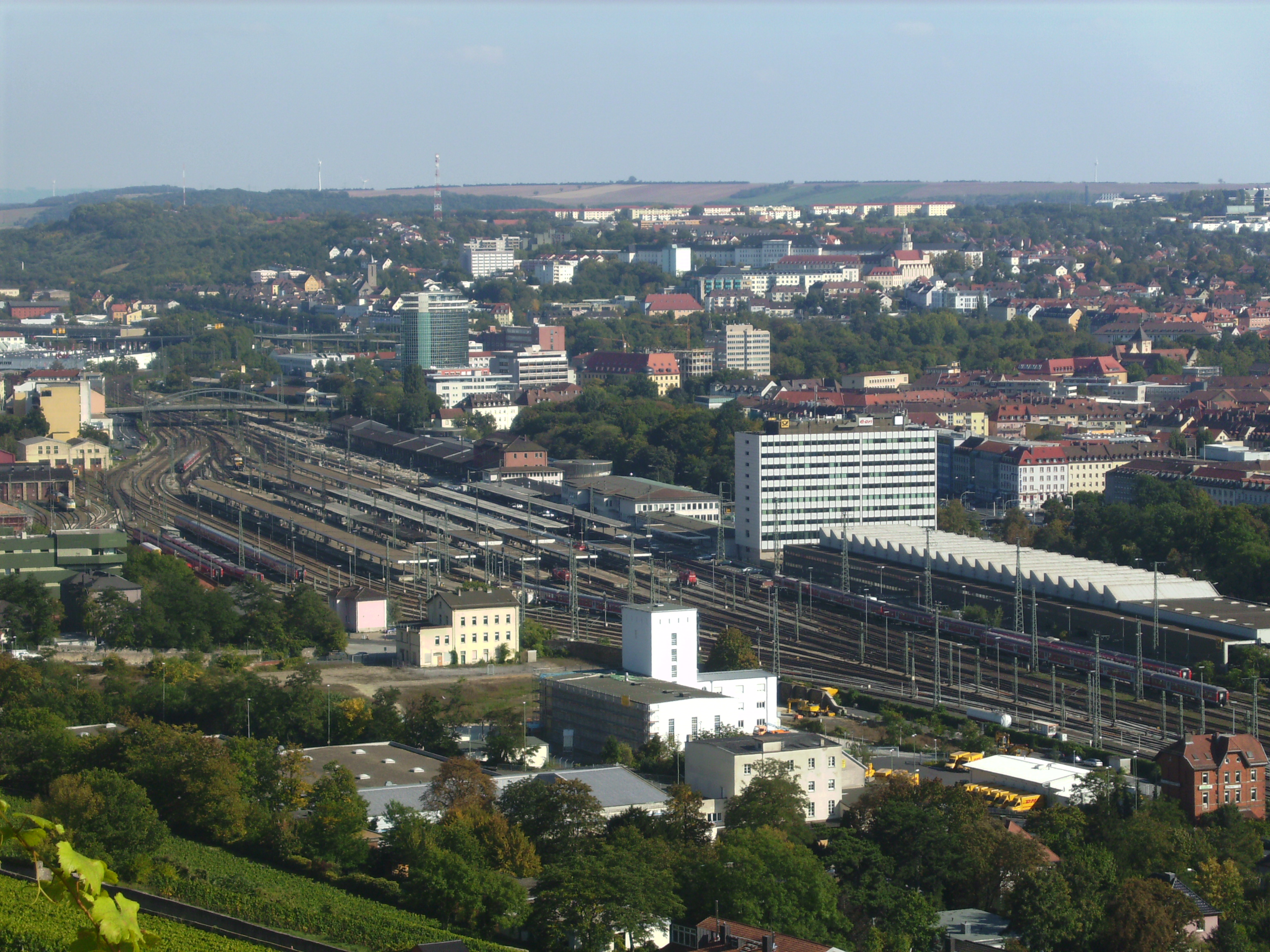
The whole station premises looking to the southeast

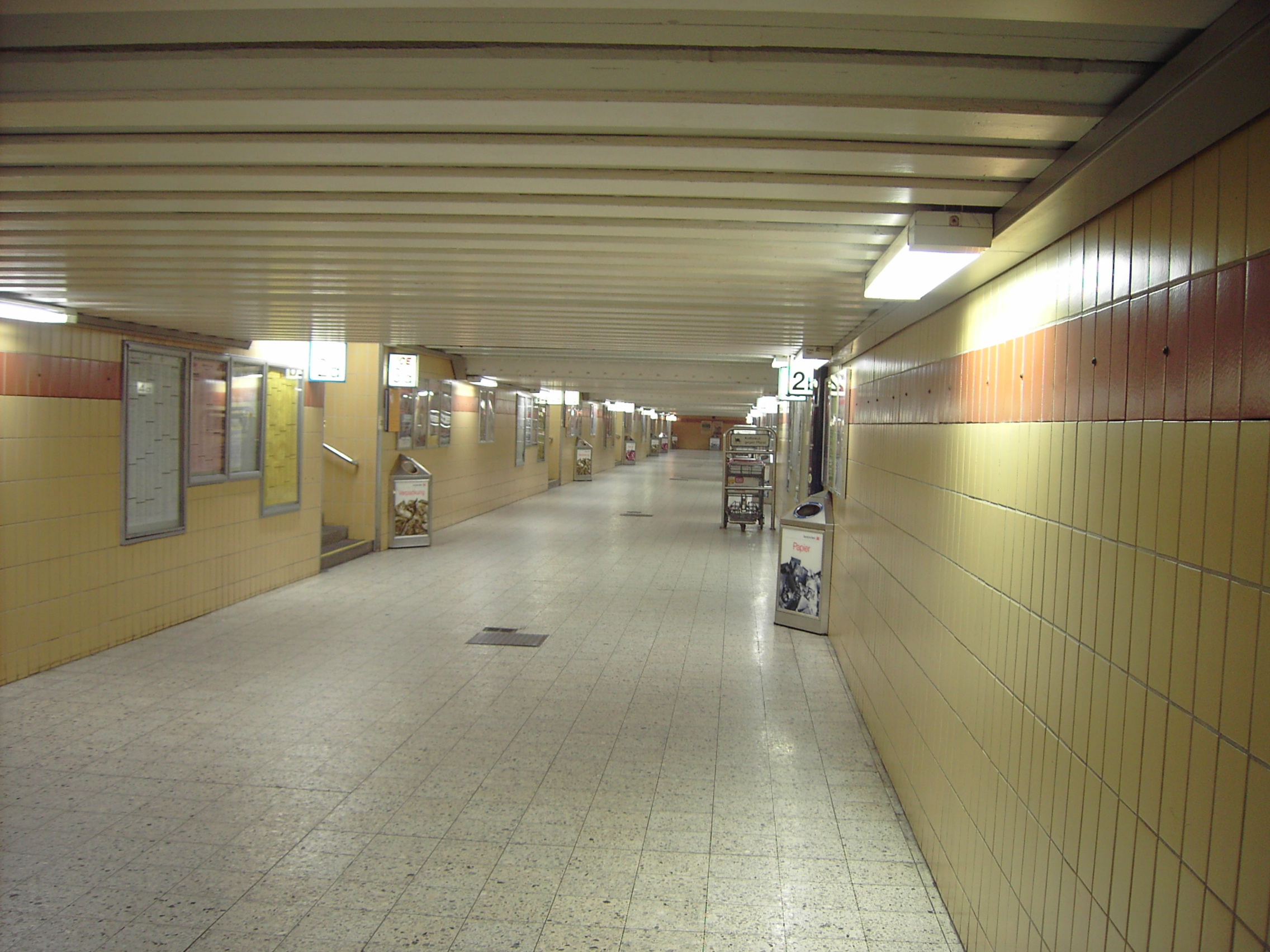
Platform underpass

The station still has extensive trackage used by both passenger and freight trains. The southern two tracks (201 and 202) are only for freight. The platform next to the station building is used for parking inter-city and has no rail services. On the remaining five island platforms the following passenger services are carried out:

- platform B: tracks 2 and 3 (local traffic), length: 435 m
- platform C: tracks 4 and 5 (long-distance and local traffic), length: 473/444 m
- platform D: tracks 6 and 7 (long-distance and local traffic), length: 417/365 m
- platform E: tracks 8 and 9 (local traffic), length: 300 m
- platform F: tracks 10 and 11 (local traffic), length: 323/329 m

All platforms are 76 cm (30 in) high, which is one of the two standard heights used in Germany. Step-free entry is still not possible to any one of trains running, as Deutsche Bahn has no long-distance trains with entrance heights of 76 cm (30 in) and the regional trains used here are mostly of older construction and can only be entered by taking several steps at the entrances. The DB subsidiary Westfrankenbahn on its service to Bad Mergentheim partly uses new class 642 diesel multiple units, which are also not barrier-free despite their low floors, as their entrances are 55 cm (22 in) high, so that passengers have to step down. The length of three of the five platforms (B, C and D) make them suitable for long-distance services and they are divided into five platform sections. Platforms C and D are over 410 metres (1,350 ft) long and almost their whole length is required for full-length Intercity-Express (ICE) trains. At the end of 2006, the previously common split-flap platform displays were replaced on the platforms and in the underpass with modern screens using LCD technology.

The platforms can be reached through a tunnel located at street level. Like the platforms, it is not designed for the current passenger traffic. The platforms are not accessible for the disabled, although the long-distance platforms and platform F have baggage conveyor belts. But at present there are no escalators, lifts or ramps. With the start of ICE services in the early 1990s, an additional platform (F) was built because the "home" platform was converted into parking for ICE sets at the same time.

In 1959, a DrS interlocking was put into operation. The system, which cost 4.7 million Deutschmarks (DM), replaced five old signal boxes and saved 28 positions. In 1969, the system was supplemented by a shunting interlocking system (SPDRs 600 technology). This DM 1.2 million system saved eight positions.

In the 1970s, Würzburg station was upgraded for the introduction of the Hanover–Würzburg new line. The tracks were redesigned so that trains on the new line could reach all platform tracks. To increase the number of simultaneous incoming and outgoing trains, the new line was placed between the two tracks of the Würzburg–Aschaffenburg line. At the same time it would be possible, with fully occupied platform tracks, for 750 m (2,460 ft) long freight trains take to pass through the rebuilt station. For these and other requirements, a step-by-step schedule was established for the upgrade of the station.

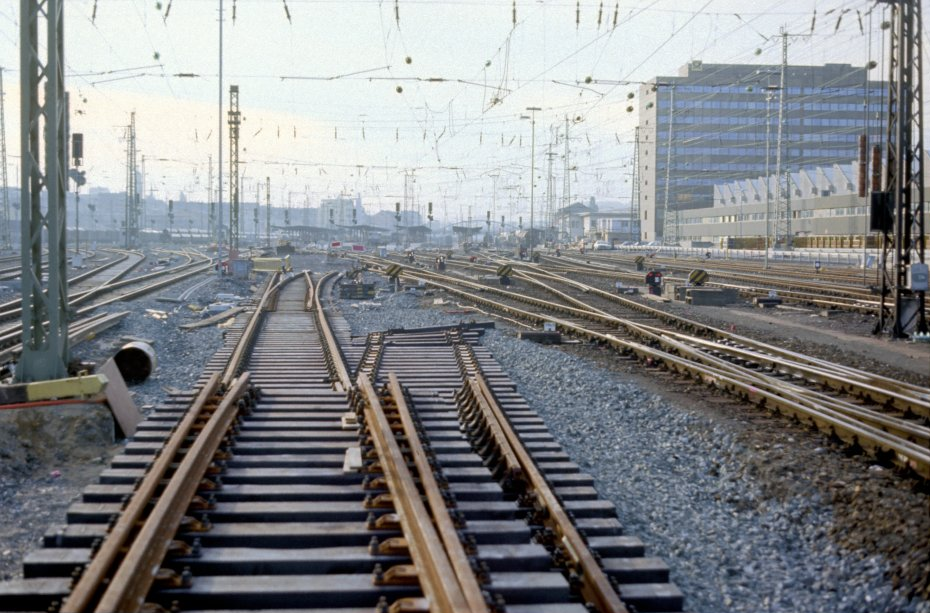
Extensive track work at the west end of the station (June 1987)

To meet the increasing performance requirements for the construction of the new line and the third track to Rottendorf, the west end of the station was completely rebuilt and the east end was partially rebuilt. In 1984, a new signal box was into operation. From 1989 until 1999, the station entrances were extensively remodelled. The performance of the node was improved by the installation of slimmer sets of points and improvements to the signalling systems. The track upgrade supported an increase in speeds from 40 to 60 km/h (25 to 37 mph) at the east end and from 60 to 80 km/h (37 to 50 mph) at the west end. The exit for the high speed line can be operated at 100 km/h (62 mph). Moreover, the traffic flows were designed so that trains would run at the entrance and exit largely without crossing paths and freight operations are concentrated on the south side of the station. These measures have substantially increased the capacity of the tracks and operations can now be handled with less noise. The travel time savings for long-distance operations is about two minutes and in conjunction with improvements to the Nuremberg–Würzburg line about seven minutes. The cost of the upgrade amounted to about DM 115 million (about €60 million). As early as 1988 to 1991, the upgrade on the eastern end had raised speeds from 40 to 60 km/h (25 to 37 mph).

==== Station forecourt ====
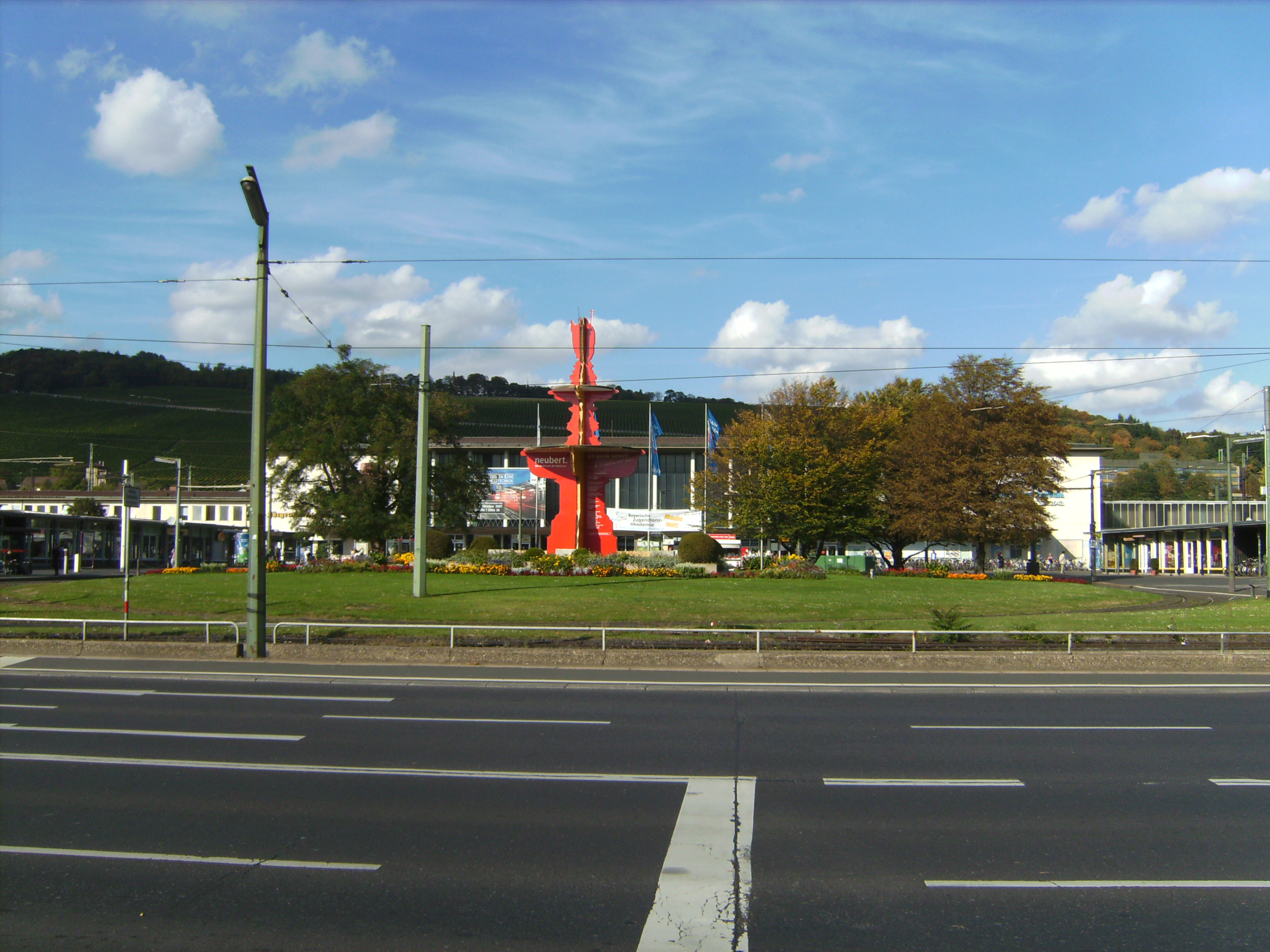
The station forecourt with a dummy of the St Kilian fountain, which was erected at the beginning of the rehabilitation. The station building is in the background.

The station forecourt extends from the entrance building to the Röntgenring and Haugerring on the inside of the ring of parks on the site of the former walls. It is bounded to the east and west by two lines of pavilions harbouring various shops.

The St Kilian fountain stands on a pedestal in the middle of the forecourt, which was inaugurated in July 1895 by Prince Regent Luitpold and is the only existing remnant of the former station. The St Kilian fountain was a gift from the Prince Regent to Würzburg; after this the Franconia fountains were built in front of the Residence in honour of Luitpold.

A bronze statue of St. Kilian stood over the basin of the fountain from 1895 to 1943. This was removed in 1943 to melt down for the production of armaments. The statue was bought back from a Hamburg scrap yard and restored on 8 July 1949. The fountain made out of Carrara marble was last sandblasted in the 1970s. Since then, the substance has deteriorated and become porous. Since it was unsafe, it had to be propped up for several years.

A renovation could not be carried out until April 2007. The fountain was dismantled over a few days and removed in pieces to the nearby Frankenhalle. It was restored and then rebuilt on the station forecourt. Where possible, the old parts were reused but new parts were also used based on the original model. The cost of the renovation of the 100-year-old structure is estimated at €1 million, which was borne by the city and the state of Bavaria. It was re-inaugurated on 24 July 2009. The Franconian apostle St Kilian crowns the fountain and faces the city. Fishing and wine growing are shown in the relief.

The terminal loop of the tram track runs around the St Kilian fountain, which has two tram stops.

=== Services ===
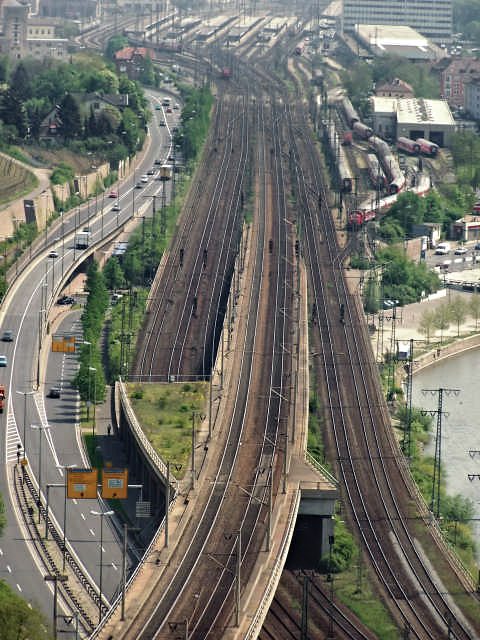
Western track field in front of Würzburg station, in the centre is the ramp of the high-speed line

==== Lines ====
Several major rail corridors cross at Würzburg Hauptbahnhof. All lines are electrified and duplicated and the highly trafficked Würzburg–Rottendorf section has three tracks. The high-speed line from Fulda is scheduled for 250 km/h (155 mph) operations for the most part. Its continuation to Nuremberg can partially be operated at speeds of up to 200 km/h (124 mph). The other routes, which mainly handle regional traffic, operate at speeds of 120 to 160 km/h (75 to 99 mph). The following is a summary of timetable routes (KBS) that begin or end here:

- KBS 351 to Fulda–Kassel–Hanover (Hanover–Würzburg high-speed railway)
- KBS 780 to Heilbronn–Stuttgart (Franconia Railway)
- KBS 800 to Aschaffenburg (Main–Spessart railway)
- KBS 805 to Nuremberg (Nuremberg–Würzburg railway)
- KBS 810 to Schweinfurt–Bamberg (via Nuremberg–Würzburg railway and Bamberg–Rottendorf railway)
- KBS 900 to Nuremberg/Ansbach–Ingolstadt/Augsburg–Munich
- KBS 920 to Ansbach–Treuchtlingen (Treuchtlingen–Würzburg railway)

==== Long-distance lines ====
In the 2026 timetable, the following services stop at the station:

Line	Route				Frequency
ICE 1	Hamburg-Altona – Hamburg – Essen – Duisburg – Düsseldorf – Cologne – Bonn – Koblenz – Mainz – Frankfurt Airport – Frankfurt – Würzburg – Nuremberg – Regensburg – Passau				Two train pairs
ICE 13	Stuttgart → Heilbronn → Würzburg → Fulda → Berlin → Berlin Ostbahnhof				One train Fr, Sa
ICE 24	Hamburg-Altona – Hamburg – Hannover – Göttingen – Kassel-Wilhelmshöhe – Würzburg – Treuchtlingen – Augsburg – Munich (– Wörgl –)			Kitzbüihel – Schwarzach-St. Veit	Some trains
ICE 24	Hamburg-Altona – Hamburg – Hannover – Göttingen – Kassel-Wilhelmshöhe – Würzburg – Treuchtlingen – Augsburg – Munich (– Wörgl –)			Innsbruck	Some trains
ICE 25	Hamburg-Altona –	Hamburg – Hamburg-Harburg – Hannover – Göttingen – Kassel-Wilhelmshöhe – Fulda – Würzburg – Nuremberg – Ingolstadt – Munich			Hourly
ICE 25	Lübeck –	Hamburg – Hamburg-Harburg – Hannover – Göttingen – Kassel-Wilhelmshöhe – Fulda – Würzburg – Nuremberg – Ingolstadt – Munich			Some trains
ICE 41	Dortmund – Bochum – Essen – Duisburg – Düsseldorf – Köln Messe/Deutz – Frankfurt Airport – Frankfurt – Aschaffenburg –			Würzburg – Nuremberg – Ingolstadt – Munich	Hourly
ICE 41	Frankfurt – Mainz – Wiesbaden – Köln Messe/Deutz – Düsseldorf – Duisburg – Essen – Bochum – Dortmund – Hamm – Paderborn – Warburg – Kassel-Wilhelmshöhe – Fulda –			Würzburg – Nuremberg – Ingolstadt – Munich	1 train pair
ICE 91	Dortmund –	Hagen – Wuppertal – Solingen –	Cologne – Bonn – Koblenz – Mainz – Frankfurt Airport – Frankfurt – Hanau –	Würzburg – Nuremberg – Regensburg – Passau – Linz – St. Pölten – Vienna	Every 2 hours
ICE 91	Dortmund –	Bochum – Essen – Duisburg – Düsseldorf –	Cologne – Bonn – Koblenz – Mainz – Frankfurt Airport – Frankfurt – Hanau –	Würzburg – Nuremberg – Regensburg – Passau – Linz – St. Pölten – Vienna	Every 2 hours
ICE 91	Hamburg-Altona – Hamburg – Hamburg-Harburg – Hannover – Göttingen – Kassel-Wilhelmshöhe – Fulda –			Würzburg – Nuremberg – Regensburg – Passau – Linz – St. Pölten – Vienna	1 train pair
EN	Hamburg-Altona – Hamburg-Dammtor – Hamburg – Göttingen – Würzburg – Nuremberg – Augsburg – Munich – Rosenheim – Kufstein – Wörgl – Jenbach – Innsbruck				1 train pair
EN	Cologne – Bonn – Koblenz – Mainz – Frankfurt Airport – Frankfurt (Main) Süd – Würzburg – Nuremberg – Regensburg – Passau – Wels – Linz – Amstetten – St. Pölten – Vienna – Vienna (car loading)				1 train pair

Due to its convenient location, long-distance trains have run from all over Germany and neighbouring countries to Würzburg station since the early days of rail travel. Therefore, it was also served on several routes of the Trans Europ Express (TEE) network, which was established in 1957. With a single domestic route and two routes to Vienna and Klagenfurt, the only non-German cities to be served directly were in nearby Austria.

- TEA 21/22: Rheinpfeil, Dortmund–Frankfurt–Würzburg–(Nuremberg)–Munich (1965–1971)
- TEA 90/91: Blauer Enzian, Hamburg–Würzburg–Munich–Klagenfurt (1965–1979)
- TEA 26/27: Prinz Eugen, Bremen–Nuremberg–Würzburg–Vienna (1971–1978)

After Deutsche Bundesbahn gradually introduced its increasingly popular Intercity network with two-class trains from 1968, the first class only TEE services were phased out.

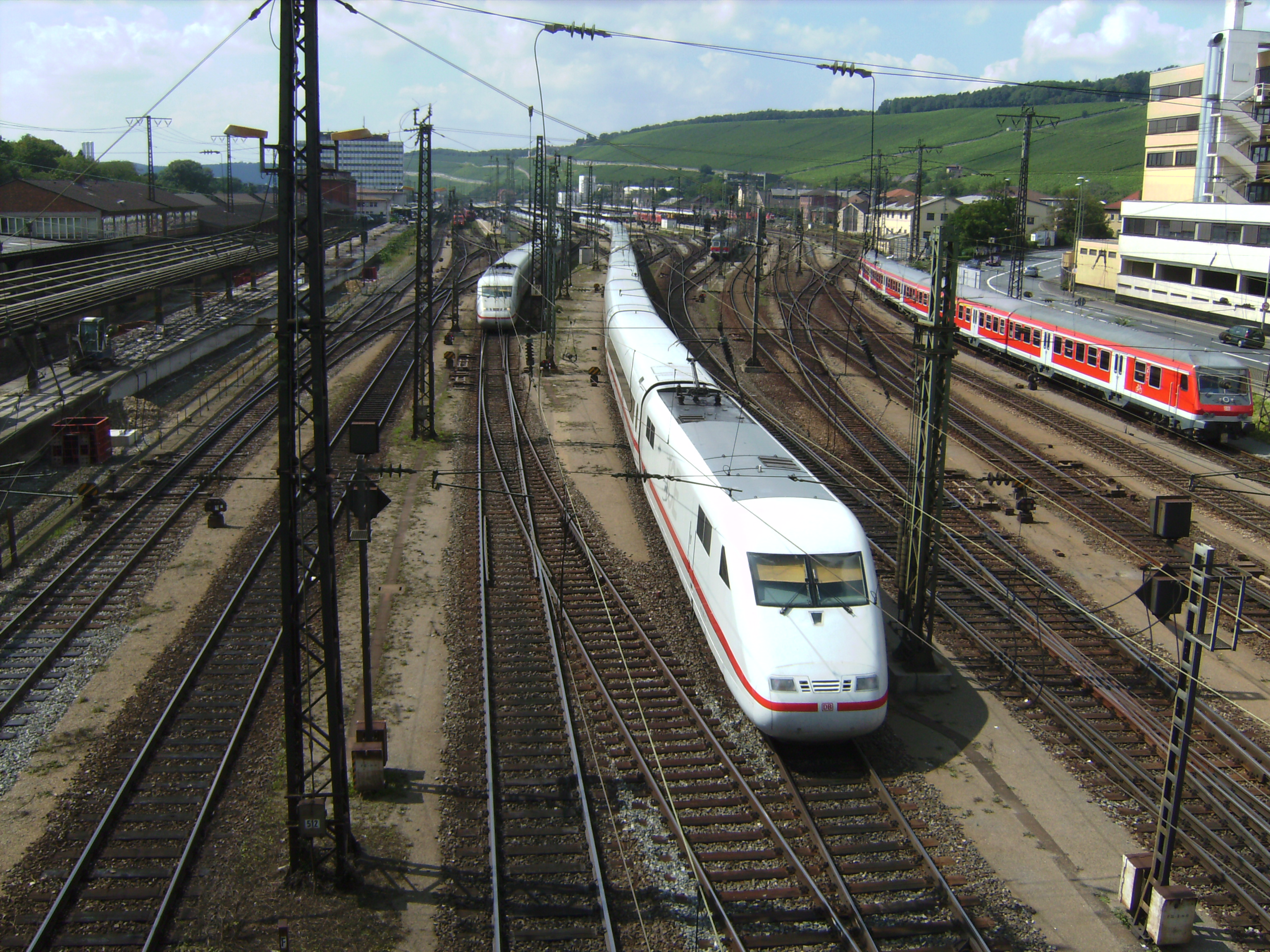
ICE meeting in the eastern track field

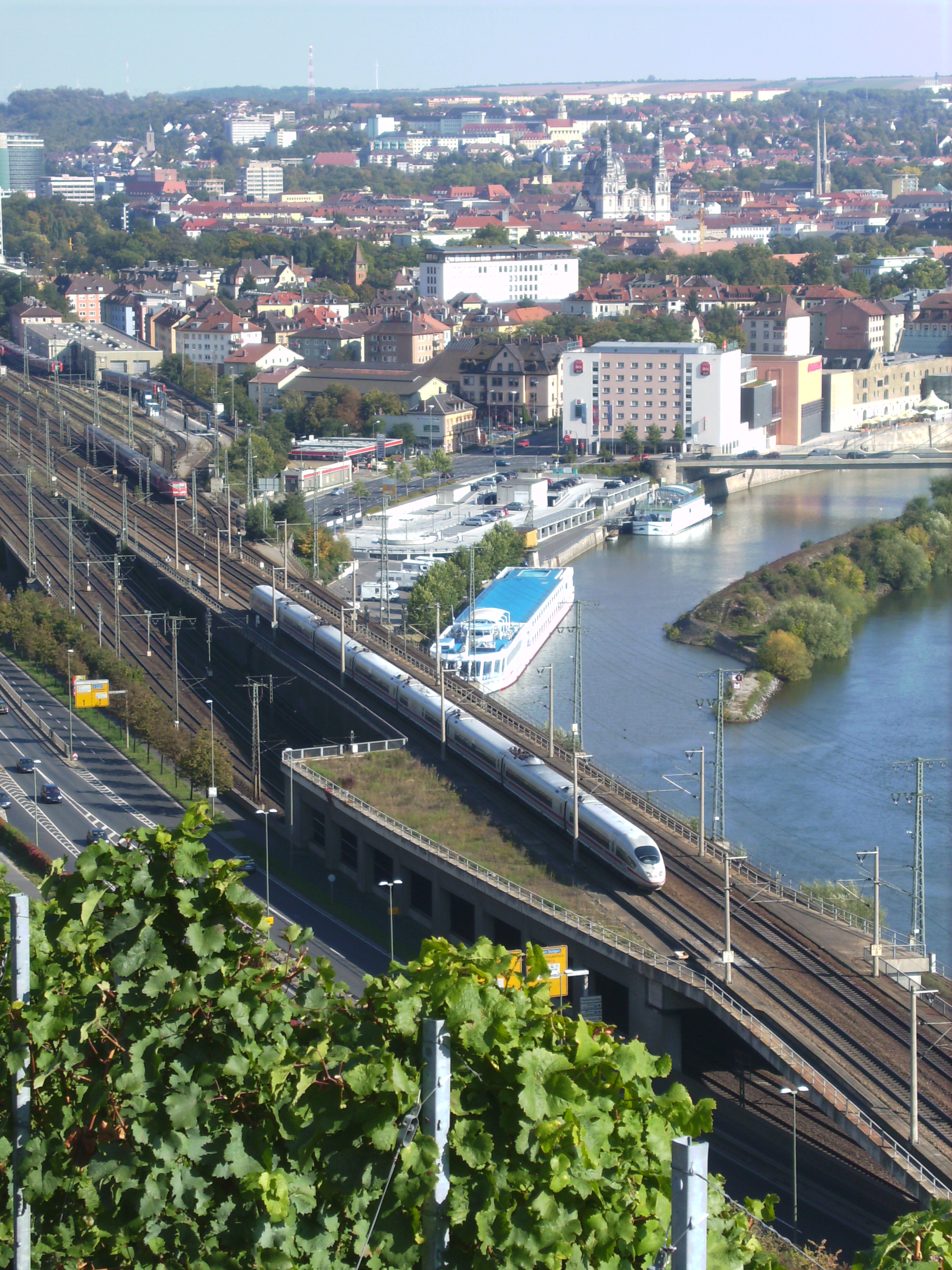
An ICE 3 passes over the ramp to the west of the station at the start of the Hanover–Würzburg high-speed line.

On 27 May 1988, the Fulda–Würzburg section was the first major section of the Hanover–Würzburg high-speed line to be put into operation. The official ceremonial opening of operations by the InterCityExperimental was held at Würzburg station at 12:58. The opening of the section was celebrated with a festival at the station on 28 and 29 May, with many shuttles services running to Fulda. The first scheduled passenger service on the new line, IC 686 (Herrenchiemsee) left Würzburg station on 29 May at 9:17. The first scheduled service arriving regularly on the high-speed line was IC 581 (Veit Stoß) at 10:42.

With the start of the summer 1991 timetable, Intercity–Express trains were put into operation as Deutsche Bundesbahn's highest train class, running on the Hamburg–Munich line via Hanover, Frankfurt (Main), Mannheim and Stuttgart, although not through Würzburg. After delivery of further ICE sets from 31 March 1992, a second connection was established between Hamburg and Munich, which ran south of Fulda on a more easterly route through the northern Bavarian cities of Würzburg and Nuremberg. With the delivery of the ICE 2, which allowed trains to be coupled and uncoupled, half a train ran every two hours to Bremen from 1997. By 1992 traffic on the north–south line through Würzburg was almost completely converted to ICE connections, while the east–west line was for a long time still operated by Intercity services. After the opening of the Cologne–Frankfurt high-speed line in 2002, the existing Intercity services from the Ruhr to Nuremberg or Munich were mostly replaced by two hourly ICE services. Since their delivery, ICE 3 sets capable of 300 km/h (186 mph) operations are used. After the integration of the Nuremberg–Ingolstadt high-speed railway in the nationwide long-distance network in December 2006, this route was received an hourly service and more coupled trains operated to various locations. At the timetable change in December 2007, the Intercity/EuroCity service from Dortmund to Vienna was converted to ICE T tilting trains, so now Würzburg is served by four of the five Deutsche Bahn ICE train classes.

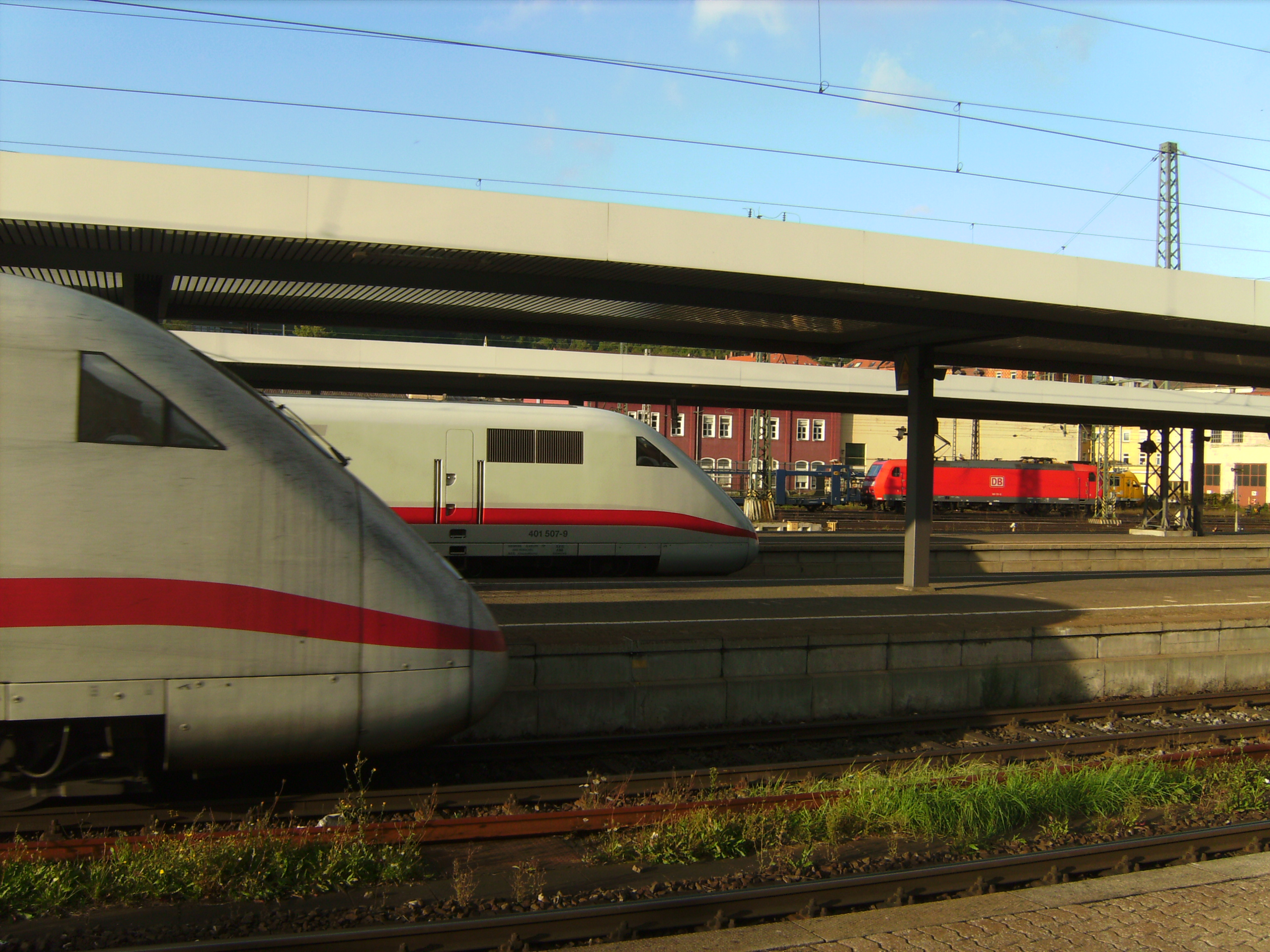
Two ICE trains of line 25 come together in Würzburg Hauptbahnhof.

Since December 2006, services to Würzburg Hauptbahnhof have been generally scheduled to run through the station at 30 minutes past the hour, to maximise connectivity between long-distance and regional services. Since the beginning of the 2007 timetable ICE line 41 has served Würzburg station hourly.

==== Regional transport routes ====
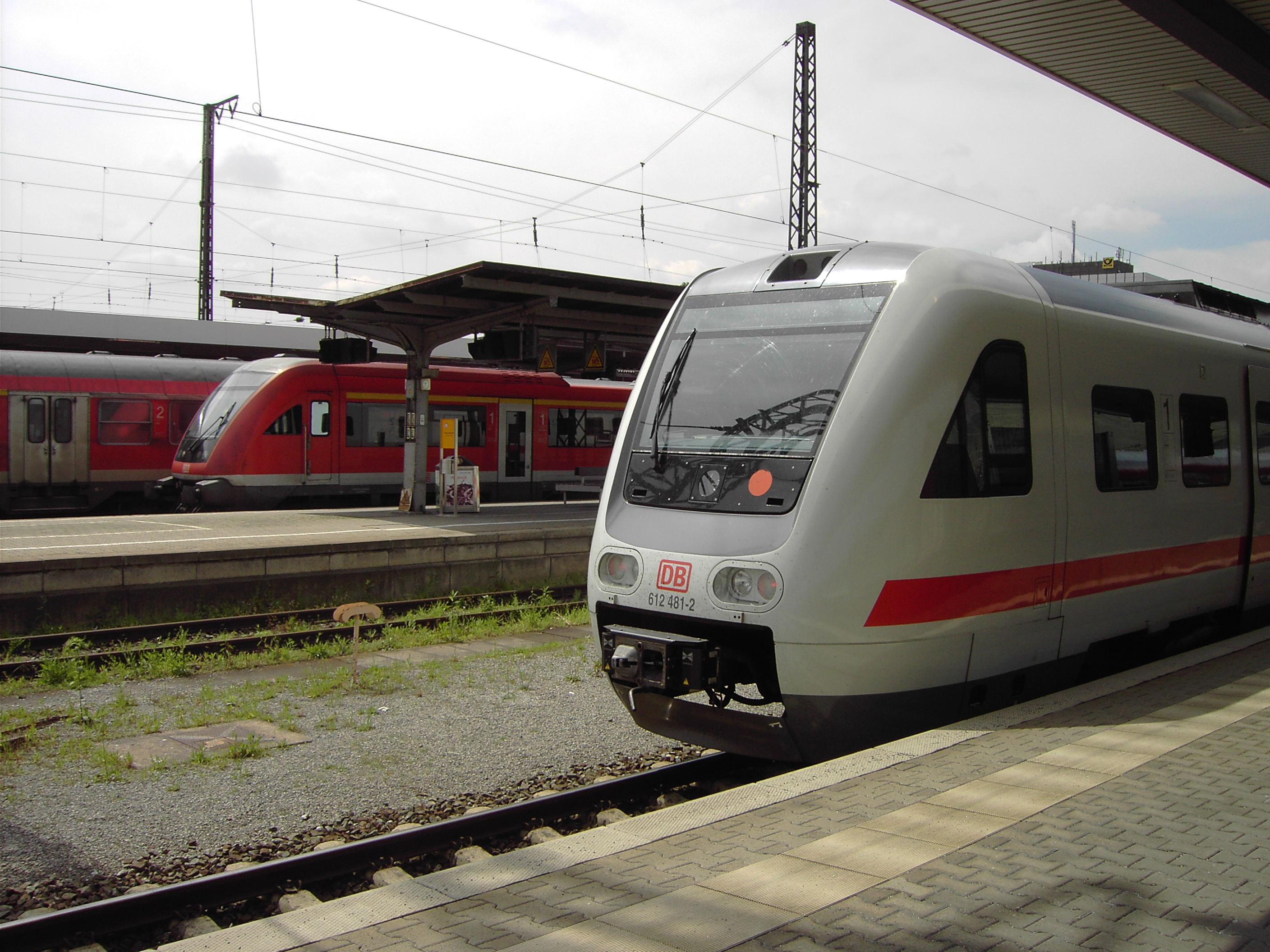
A Modus set and a diesel multiple unit of class 612 in Würzburg Hauptbahnhof

Würzburg Hauptbahnhof is connected by the following services to the rail network:

Train type	Route		Frequency	Stock
RE 7 / RE 57	Würzburg HBF – Schweinfurt – Ebenhausen (Unterfr)	Bad Kissingen	Every 2 hours	class 612
RE 7 / RE 57	Würzburg HBF – Schweinfurt – Ebenhausen (Unterfr)	Münnerstadt – Bad Neustadt (Saale) – Mellrichstadt – Grimmenthal – Suhl – Zella-Mehlis – Plaue (Thür) – Arnstadt – Neudietendorf – Erfurt	Every 2 hours	class 612
RE 8	Würzburg Hbf – Lauda – Osterburken – Möckmühl – Bad Friedrichshall – Neckarsulm – Heilbronn – Bietigheim-Bissingen – Ludwigsburg – Stuttgart		Hourly	Stadler Flirt 3
RE 10	Würzburg Hbf – Rottendorf – Dettelbach – Buchbrunn-Mainstockheim – Kitzingen – Iphofen – Markt Bibart – Neustadt (Aisch) – Emskirchen – Siegelsdorf – Fürth (Bay) – Nuremberg		Hourly	class 440
RE 10	Würzburg Hbf – Rottendorf – Dettelbach – Buchbrunn-Mainstockheim – Kitzingen		Hourly (peak)	class 440 class 425
RE 20	Franken-Thüringen-Express: Würzburg Hbf – Schweinfurt – Haßfurt – Bamberg (– Forchheim – Erlangen – Fürth (Bay) – Nuremberg)		Every 2 hours	class 442
RE 54	Main-Spessart-Express (MSX): Bamberg – Haßfurt – Schweinfurt – Würzburg – Gemünden – Aschaffenburg – Hanau – Maintal – Frankfurt		Every 2 hours	class 445 (Twindexx Vario)
RE 55	(Bamberg –) Würzburg Hbf – Karlstadt – Gemünden – Lohr – Aschaffenburg – Hanau – Offenbach (Main) – Frankfurt (Main) Süd – Frankfurt (Main)		Every 2 hours, some trains continuing to Bamberg	class 445 (Twindexx Vario)
RB 53	(Schlüchtern – Sterbfritz –) Jossa – Obersinn – Mittelsinn – Burgsinn – Rieneck – Gemünden – Wernfeld – Karlstadt – Himmelstadt – Retzbach-Zellingen – Thüngersheim – Veitshöchheim – Würzburg-Zell – Würzburg Hbf – Rottendorf – Seligenstadt – Bergtheim – Essleben – Waigolshausen – Schweinfurt – Schweinfurt Mitte – Schweinfurt Stadt – Schonungen – Haßfurt – Zeil (Main) – Ebelsbach-Eltmann – Oberhaid – Bamberg		Hourly	class 440
RB 53	Karlstadt – Himmelstadt – Retzbach-Zellingen – Thüngersheim – Veitshöchheim – Würzburg-Zell – Würzburg Hbf		Hourly (peak), continuing as RE10 to Nuremberg	class 440
RB 53	Würzburg Hbf – Rottendorf – Seligenstadt – Bergtheim – Essleben – Waigolshausen – Schweinfurt – Schweinfurt Mitte – Schweinfurt Stadt		Hourly (peak)	class 425 class 440
RB 79	Aschaffenburg – Gemünden – Würzburg Hbf – Rottendorf – Seligenstadt – Schweinfurt – Bamberg		Some trains	class 425 class 440
RE 80	Würzburg Hbf – Ansbach – Treuchtlingen (– Donauwörth – Augsburg Hbf – München-Pasing – Munich)		Hourly (to Treuchtlingen), every 2 hours (to Munich)	class 462 class 463
RB 80	Würzburg Hbf – Würzburg Süd – Winterhausen – Goßmannsdorf – Ochsenfurt – Marktbreit		Hourly (peak)	class 425 class 440
RB 85	Würzburg Hbf – Würzburg Süd – Reichenberg – Geroldshausen – Kirchheim (Unterfr) – Gaubüttelbrunn – Wittighausen – Zimmern – Grünsfeld – Gerlachsheim – Lauda – Osterburken		Hourly	class 440 class 425
As of 11 December 2022

All Regional-Express services (except the Mainfranken-Thüringen-Express) and the Regionalbahn services to Treuchtlingen reach Würzburg station just before the half-hour and leave it a few minutes after the half-hour. Thus there are connections between them and with two regular long-distance services.

==== Connections with trams and buses ====
Würzburg station is also a central transfer station for trams and buses. In the station forecourt are the Würzburg tram stops of Hauptbahnhof West and Hauptbahnhof Ost (east). This division of departure platforms for trams to the inner city (west) and Grombühl (east) was established in 1996 as a "temporary" measure during the construction of a new station, which has not yet commenced. Immediately west of the station forecourt is the bus station where the majority of urban and regional bus routes start.

== Future development ==
In 2004, the city of Würzburg published plans for the post office area to the west of the station building by the Essen company Management für Immobilien AG (mfi), which would involve building a shopping centre with an area of 20,000 square metres, including a wedding hall. The so-called Würzburg Arcaden (Wurzburg arcades) would extend to the current bus station, where the Quellenbach parking station would be built. The ambitious schedule provided for a completion of the project by the end of 2006. A citizens' initiative warned against drastic changes to the ring of parks on the former wall, which would have been affected, and demanded a referendum. Before that was carried out, however, the project was abandoned in October 2004 because of differences with the managers of the venue.

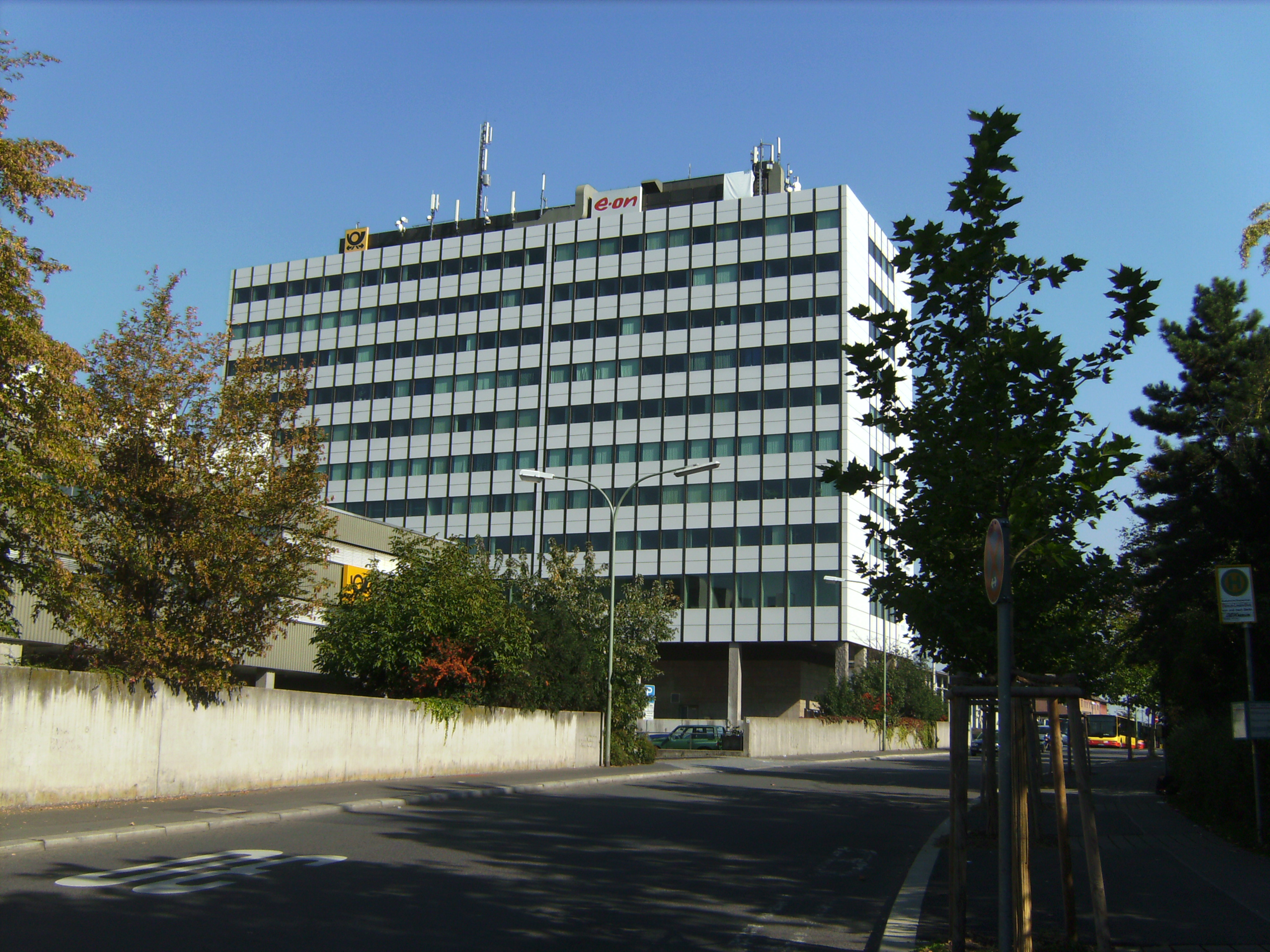
The post office tower. To the left is the development area for the Arcades.

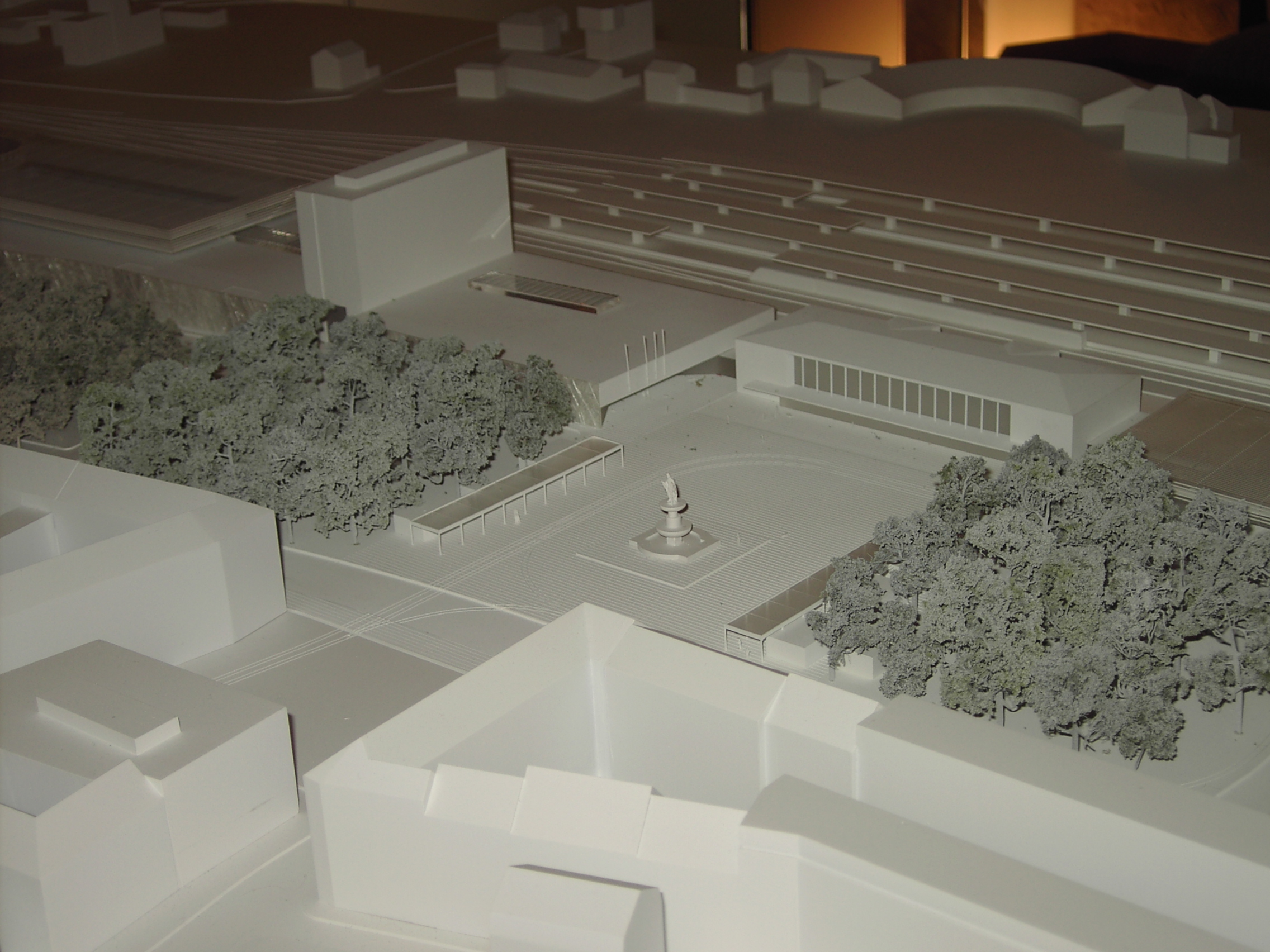
Winning design of the architectural competition to redesign the station environment

After the project had failed at the first attempt, mfi brought a revised version to the table in July 2005. This did not include the originally planned development of the bus station, instead, the arcades would be built on the west wing of the main station and a connection to the station building would be created. The profits from the sale of the west wing were intended to be invest in the modernisation of the station building by Deutsche Bahn. Mfi pledged to finance the redevelopment of the station forecourt, the relocation of the bus station on the eastern side of the station and the greening of its current location. Far-reaching changes were also planned in the layout of roads and tram tracks, so that sections of the Haugerring and Röntgenring (the streets on the south side of the ring of parks) would have been widened to five lanes and the tramline to Grombühl would have been relocated from the Haugerring to Haugerglacisstraße (on the north side of the ring of parks next to the station).

On 14 December 2005, the council agreed by a narrow margin to the construction of Würzburg Arcaden and so paved the way for the €250 million project. Finally, in mid-2006, an architectural competition for the redevelopment of the station environment was started, which selected the Stuttgart office of Auer+Weber+Assoziierte and the Hamburg landscape architects, WES & Partner.

The citizens' initiative Ringpark-in-Gefahr ("Ring Park in danger") succeeded in having a referendum called, which took place on 3 December 2006. The proponents of the initiative warned of, despite the planned restoration of the bus station area to the ring park, impending gridlock and the desolation of the inner city after the opening of the proposed shopping centre. With a turnout of over 40 percent, the Wurzburg citizens decided by about 51 to 49 percent, to support the joint project of mfi, Deutsche Bahn and the city—a majority of 985 in favour. Many people complained after the vote that the voting slip was confusing and difficult to understand and more than 12 percent of all votes cast were invalid.

=== 2007: further development after the breakdown of Würzburg Arcaden ===
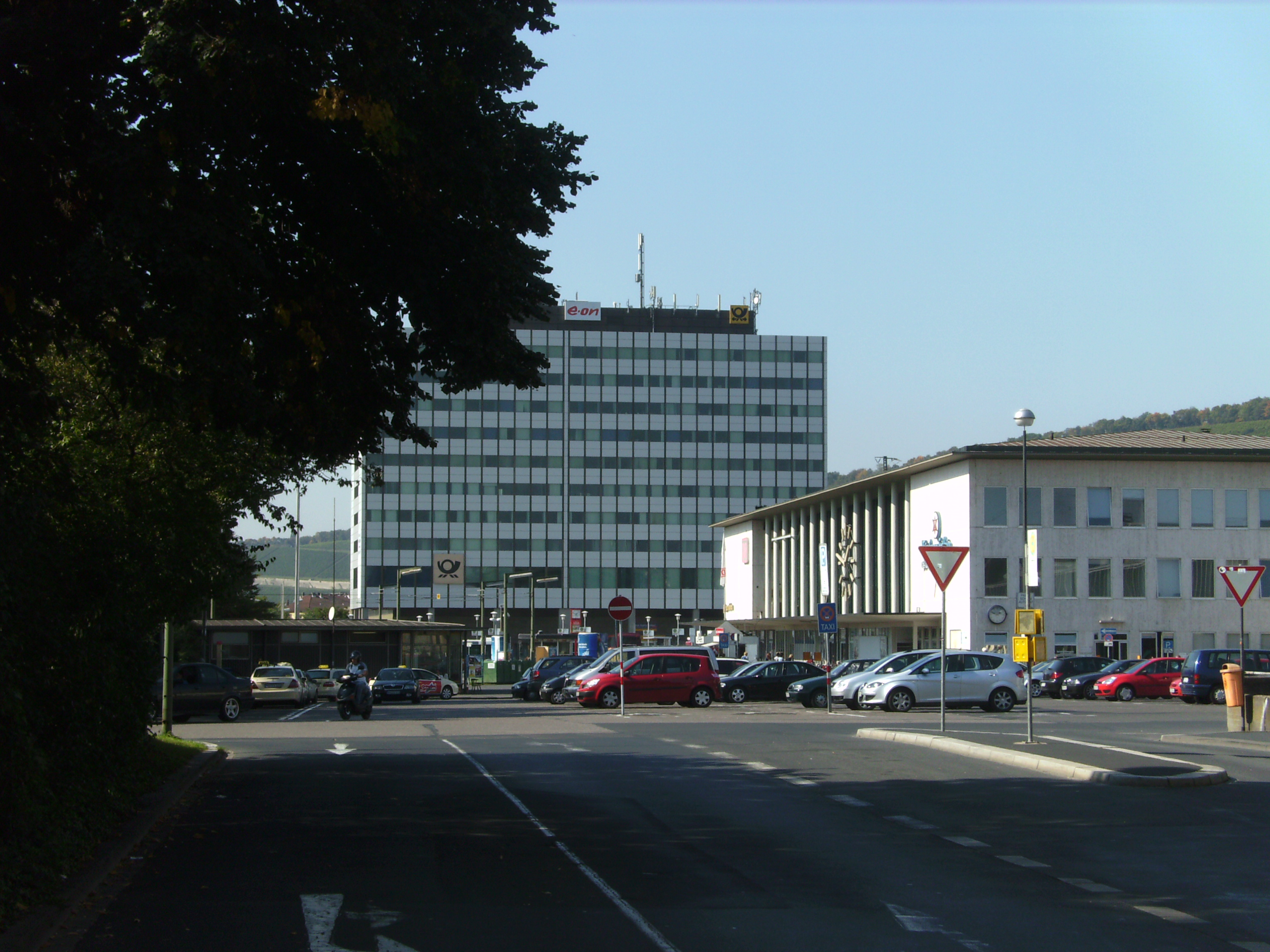
The short term car park on the eastern side of the station building is to be used for the bus station and the new tram line towards Grombühl.

After the referendum was put the federal parliamentarian, Walter Kolbow, who, like the state parliamentarian Rainer Boutter (both SPD), had criticized the coupling of the station redevelopment and the arcade project before the vote, called for the redevelopment to be carried out in several stages. At his initiative, a four-hour summit meeting was held on 12 March 2007 between the then Mayor of Würzburg, Pia Beckmann and the CEO of DB Station&Service, Wolf-Dieter Siebert. Federal and state grants of up to 80 percent of the cost of the renovation of the platforms and their access had already been largely secured, and it was suggested at the meeting that €8 million for the renovation of the entrance building in 2011/2012 was on the way. Deutsche Bahn would provide €3 million and the city of Würzburg would be able to put together €5 million. To keep the city's contribution to a minimum, Mayor Pia Beckmann had brought a "stripped down" version to the discussion, which did not require the development of the second floor. Despite their initial opposition, Deutsche Bahn finally accepted this proposal and also waived the requirement that the City fund €5 million of the cost.

Furthermore, the city is planning extensive changes in the station environment. This will mean that the station forecourt will have a uniform design and more attractive pavilion shops will be built. In addition, the conversion of the current location of the bus station into parkland and the installation of the bus station on the eastern side of the station is planned. Land there that is currently still owned by subsidiaries of Deutsche Bahn is required in return for the city's participation in the rebuilding of station. In particular, as the Würzburg tramway is crowded even after the reorganisation of the tram service, the construction of a central tram stop in front of the entrance building is required. These projects are to be taken forward after the completion of the renovation of the station.

==== Remediation for the 2018 state garden show ====
According to Deutsche Bahn, the station is to be rehabilitated for the State Garden Show 2018 from March 2010. The redevelopment of the eastern part of the station building is currently (as of February 2013) expected to be completed in the spring of 2013. The first floor offices are also to be renewed. In addition, the station underpass will be built, including the installation of lifts to the platforms. Likewise, a completely new toilet facility will be built. The barrier-free upgrade of the station will cost €32 million.

== See also ==
- 2016 Würzburg train attack
- Rail transport in Germany
- Railway stations in Germany

== Sources ==
- Erich Preuß (ed.). "Würzburg Hbf". Das große Archiv der deutschen Bahnhöfe (in German). GeraMond.
- Suse Schmuck (2004). Der Bahnhof und sein Platz (in German). Würzburg: Schöningh. ISBN 3-87717-811-1.
- Ulrich Wagner (1994). Würzburg. Ein verlorenes Stadtbild (in German). Gudensberg-Gleichen: Wartberg. ISBN 3-86134-225-1.
- Hans-Peter Schäfer (1979). "Planung und Bau der Hauptstrecken bis 1879". Die Entstehung des mainfränkischen Eisenbahn-Netzes (in German) (1). Würzburg: Institut für Geographie. ISSN 0510-9833.
