= Nuremberg–Würzburg railway =

German trunk line railway

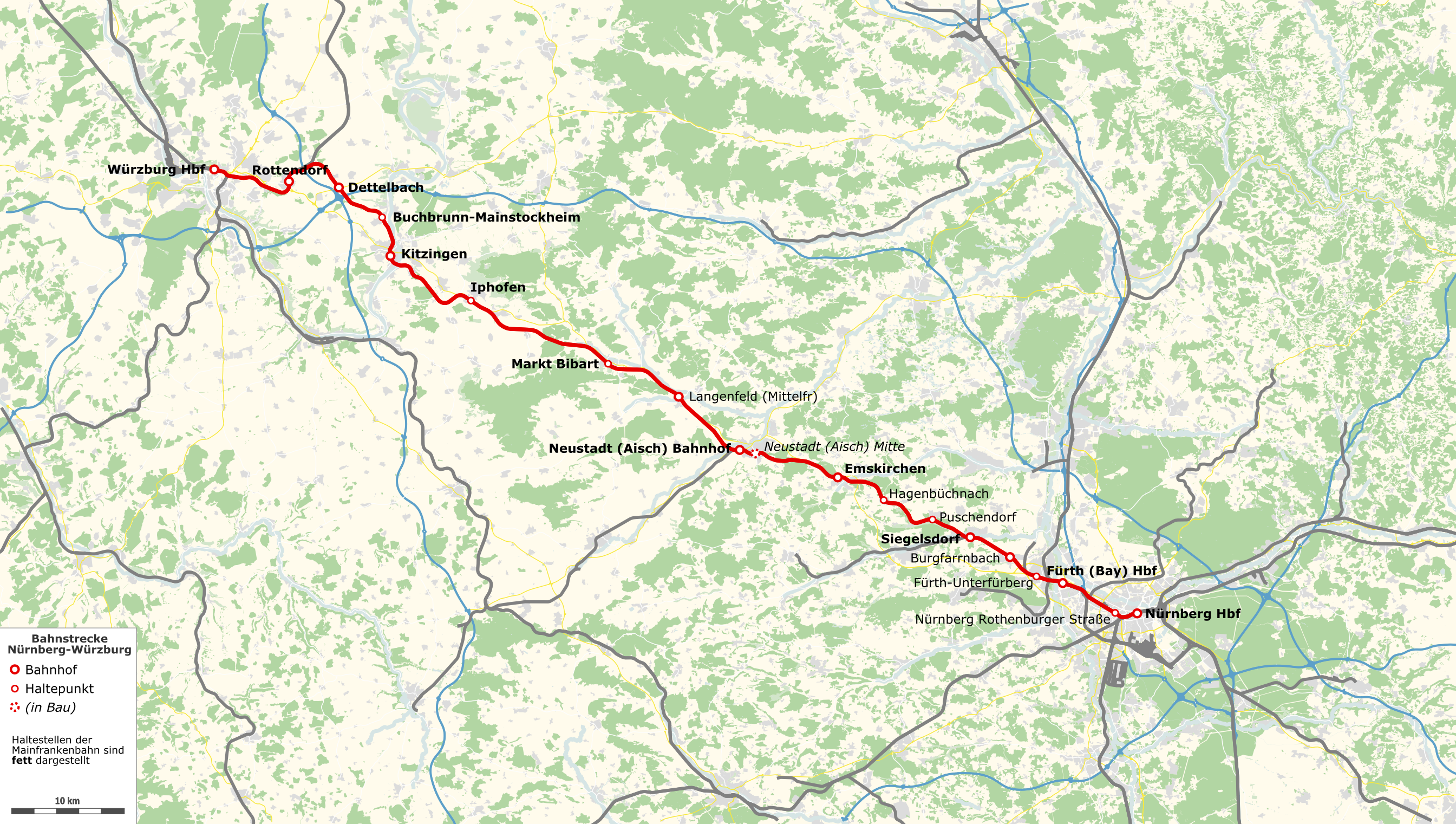

Overview
- Line number: 5900 (Nuremberg Hbf – Fürth (Bay) Hbf); 5910 (Fürth (Bay) Hbf – Würzburg Hbf)
- Locale: Bavaria, Germany

Service
- Route number: 805, 811, 891.1, 900

Technical
- Line length: 102.2 km (63.5 mi)
- Number of tracks: 2
- Track gauge: 1,435 mm (4 ft 8 1/2 in) standard gauge
- Electrification: 15 kV/16.7 Hz AC overhead catenary
- Operating speed: 200 km/h (124.3 mph) (max)

The Nuremberg–Würzburg Railway is a German trunk line railway in northern Bavaria, connecting the city of Nuremberg with Würzburg, the two largest cities in Franconia, and passing through Fürth, Neustadt an der Aisch and Kitzingen. In addition to hourly Regional-Express trains and numerous freight trains, it is served by Intercity-Express trains during the day at half-hourly intervals with some gaps.

== Route description ==
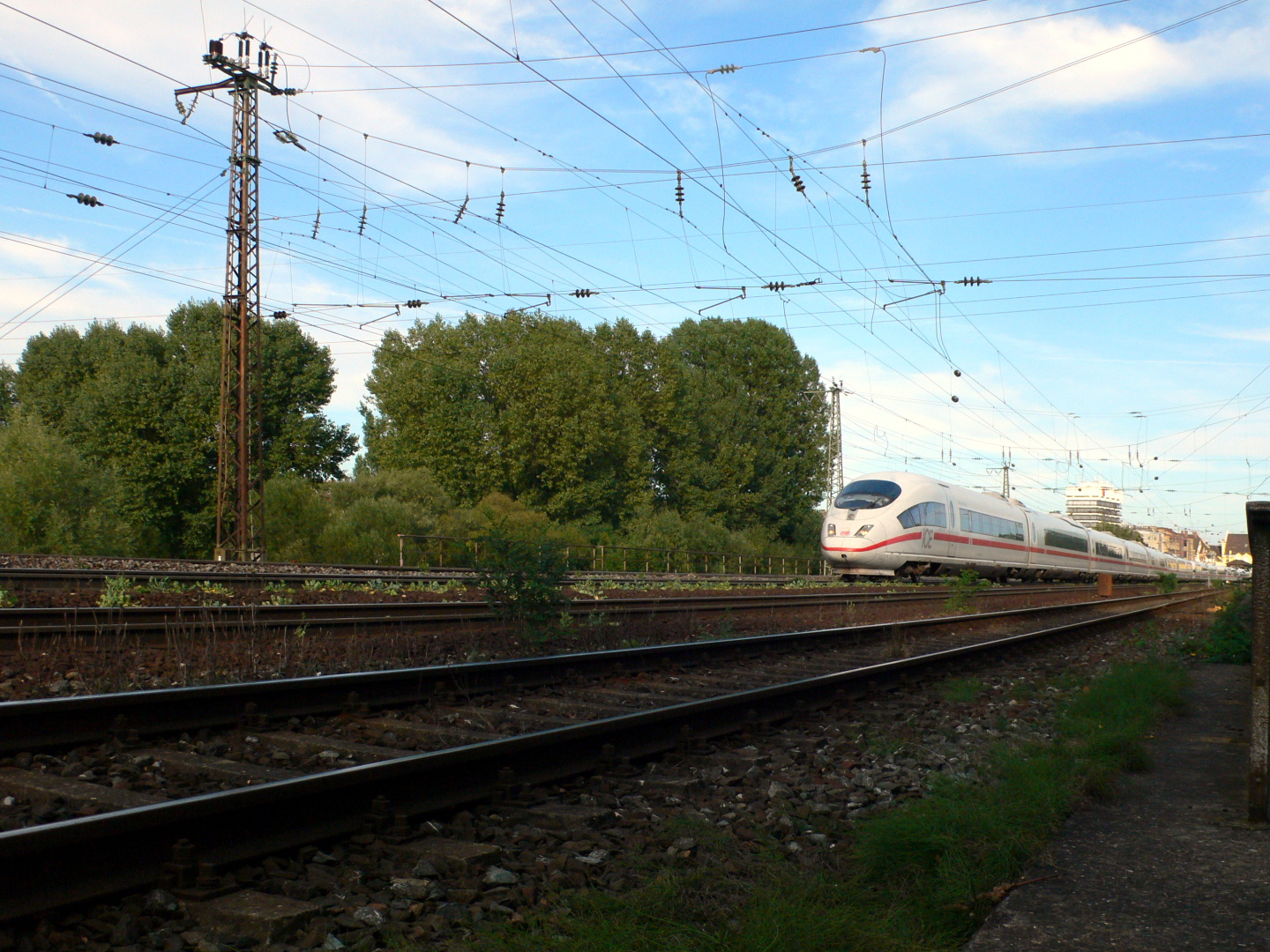
ICE on the Seven Arch Bridge (Siebenbogenbrücke) in Fürth

On its total length of just over 100 kilometres (62 mi), the railway line has a total of 18 stations. The two endpoints of the line, Nuremberg Hbf and Würzburg Hbf, are served by fast long-distance services.

The line runs through more than 80 curves in a landscape of low ranges.

== History ==
The 86 km (53 mi) stretch from Fürth to Rottendorf near Würzburg was built in as a shortcut between the Ludwig South-North Railway in Nuremberg and Ludwig's Western Railway line in Wurzburg. This shortened the 155 km (96 mi)-long indirect route via Bamberg and Schweinfurt. The state railway initially had little interest in the connection, so initially private Committees considered plans for such a route. At first, in 1857, a proposal via Siegelsdorf, Windsheim, Marktbreit and Ochsenfurt had been favoured, which led to an alternative route being put forward from the Neustadt and Kitzingen area, which ultimately prevailed.

Initially, short sections were built as sections of other rail lines:

- 1 July 1854: Rottendorf–Würzburg, 8.0 km long, as part of the Ludwig Western Railway
- 1 October 1862: Nürnberg–Fürth, 7.7 km (4.8 mi) long, with the partial relocation of the Ludwig South-North Railway on this section
- 1 July 1864: the entrance to the new Würzburg station with the closing of the old Ludwig station.

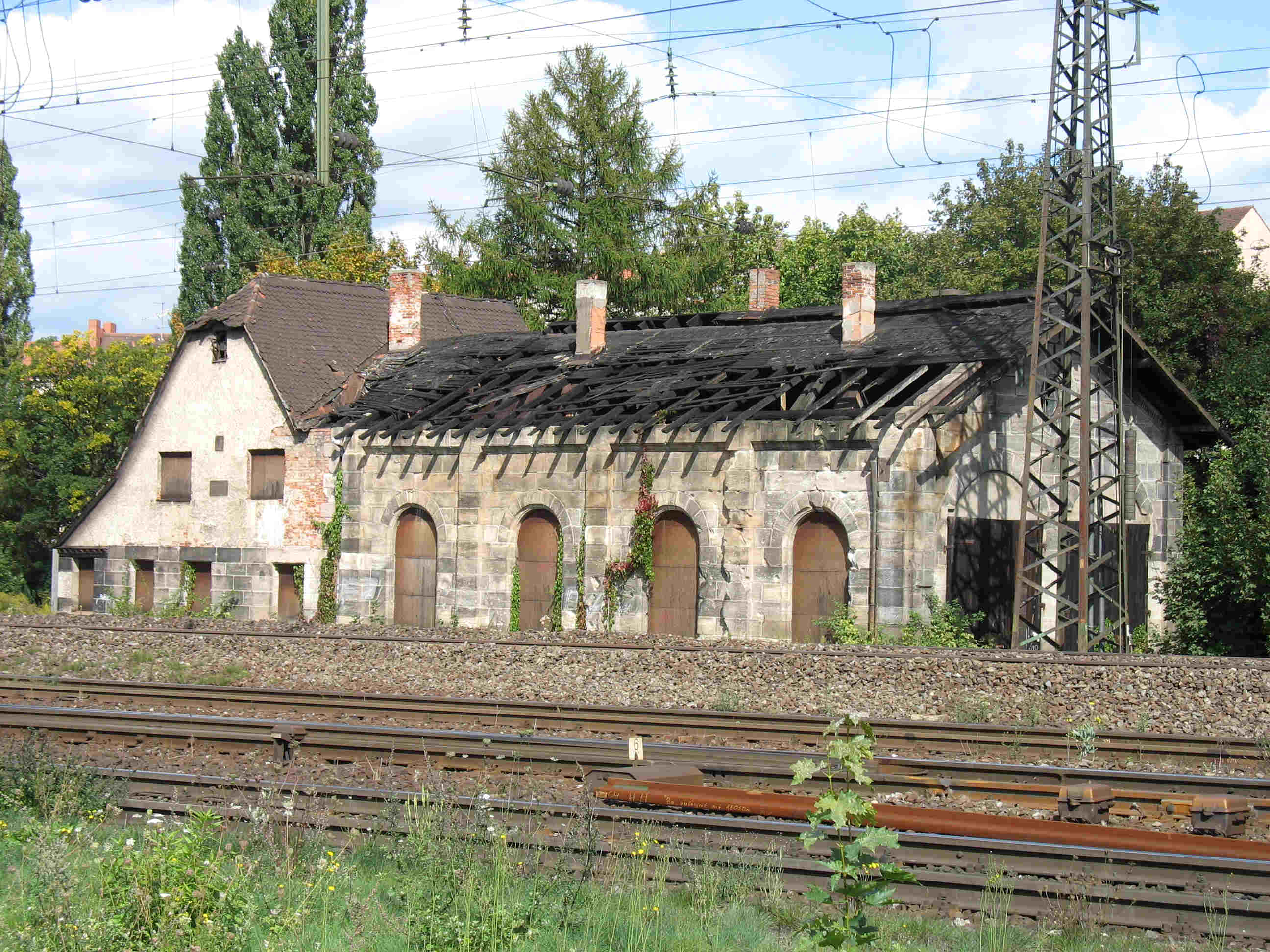
One of Germany's oldest locomotive shed (the section on the right, built with the line to Würzburg in 1862/65) is located on the line in Fürth and closed.

Construction began in 1861 and was completed in 1864. Only the viaduct in Emskirchen was not finished due to the difficult ground conditions. The Nuremberg–Würzburg railway was finally completed with opening of the 86.6 kilometre-long Fürth–Rottendorf section on 19 June 1865. At the same time the eight km-long section between Rottendorf and Würzburg was duplicated. In the summer of 1985 a third track was added to this section.

On 1 July 1886, a heavy head-on collision of two trains took place between Würzburg and Rottendorf, causing the death of 16 people.

On 8 December 1889, the Bavarian State Parliament approved the doubling of the single-track line between Fürth and Rottendorf, which was completed by 1891.

On 10 June 1928 at 02:30, the locomotive of the night train D 47, a class S3/6, derailed while crossing the Zenngrund bridge shortly before the entry to Siegelsdorf station. The locomotive crashed down the embankment and the carriages followed it. This killed 24 people.

The Aurach viaduct in Emskirchen was renovated 1939, with the previous “fish-bellied” bridge (having lens-shaped iron trusses, similar to the Royal Albert Bridge) replaced by a steel box construction.

In the Nazi period, the first preliminary work began to connect the line from Mainbernheim via a wye with the Würzburg–Treuchtlingen railway (near Marktbreit). Because of the Second World War, this project, which had already been considered in 1868 by the Royal Bavarian War Ministry, remained unfinished.

Despite being bombed in February 1945, the bridge over the Main in Kitzingen was passable, but Wehrmacht soldiers blew it up along with the neighbouring bridge on the Kitzingen–Schweinfurt railway. Some wagons of a coal train that had broken loose fell into the Main. The northern abutment of the Aurach Bridge in Emskirchen was also blown up. The line was probably back in traffic from 15 October 1945.

The electrification of the line began on 8 August 1952 with the installation of the first catenary mast in Neustadt (Aisch) station and it was formally opened on 2 October 1954 with a special train.

A pilot installation of train radio, which had been approved in 1959, was introduced in 1962; this culminated in the nationwide introduction of the ZBF 70 system in 1974.

In the 1960s, a number of level crossings were abolished or replaced by bridges and underpasses. Between 1965 and 1968, the previous push-button interlockings were replaced by automatic block signaling. As a result, the hand-operated block and junction signal boxes at Kohlenhof, Rothenburger Straße and Neusünderbühl on the Nuremberg–Fürth section were replaced. Subsequently, the branches were remotely controlled from Nuremberg Hauptbahnhof. The investment of DM 900,000 produced a return of 40 percent with the saving three old signal boxes and 15 signalmen.

The stations of Sickershausen, Mainbernheim, Markt Einersheim and Hellmitzheim were closed for passenger operations in 1982 and Langenfeld station was closed in 1992.

As one of the oldest railway lines in Germany, the line was declared overloaded in 2008.

A new station was opened between Emskirchen and Neustadt (Aisch) as Neustadt (Aisch) Mitte ("central") station on 10 December 2012. It complements Neustadt (Aisch) station, which is poorly on the town's western outskirts.

=== Development ===
The line is double track throughout. The section between Nürnberg and Fürth was electrified on 15 May 1939 and Fürth to Wurzburg was electrified on 3 October 1954. The 19th century line had a minimum railway curve radius of 2,000 Bavarian feet (about 600 m) causing numerous speed limits of 100 km/h (62 mph). Thus, today (as of 2015) the stations of Neustadt (Aisch) Rottendorf (Einfahrkurve) and Kitzingen can only be passed at 100 km/h (62 mph).

The first Federal Transport Infrastructure Plan (Bundesverkehrswegeplan, 1973) identified the line from Würzburg to Nuremberg and continuing to Augsburg as one of eight railway development projects. The same route was included in its update, "the coordinated investment program for federal transport" in 1977 as one of six development projects. The upgrade package consisted of 115 individual measures. The aim of the project was, above all, in the capacity expansion.

Further development was foreseen as part of the ABS/NBS Würzburg–Nürnberg–München, which was included as one of 13 new projects that were identified as urgent needs in the 1985 Federal Transport Infrastructure Plan. The Nuremberg–Würzburg line was designated as project ABS 8/2. Planning for line improvements was underway by 1990. Different parts of the line were upgraded from 1992. The line was upgraded for operations with active tilting technology in 2007. The ICE T, which has operated on the line since December 2007, was thus able to operate on sections faster than trains without tilting technology, before problems with their axles put an end to high-speed operations in 2008.

==== 1976–1987 upgrade ====
115 individual measures were planned in the first stage of the upgrade, as part of the ABS 8 project. In addition to the upgrade of the Würzburg–Rottendorf section to three-tracks, eleven new platform accesses that avoided crossing railway tracks, continuous bi-directional signalling, shorter signalling blocks and adjustments and upgrades to the traction power supply were provided. Step-free platform access was created at the stations of Dettelbach, Kitzingen, Iphofen, Markt Bibart and Emskirchen.

The third track between Würzburg and Rottendorf went into operation in July 1985. It is considered a continuation of the new line between Hannover and Würzburg. The section between Würzburg and Rottendorf was congested in the early 1980s. Although the line between Würzburg and Rottendorf had a nominal capacity of 240 trains per day (both ways), 290 passenger and freight trains operated on it on weekdays. During peak hours many freight trains had to be diverted or kept in sidings. In order for the line to deal with the expected increase in traffic as a result of the planned Hanover–Würzburg high-speed line, plans were developed in 1976 for a third track on the 8 km-long section. On 13 July 1979, the Federal Minister of Transport granted a permit to upgrade the track in accordance with the Federal Railway Act. The planning approval process that had been initiated at the beginning of 1979 was completed on 15 May 1980 with approval for the plan. After a lawsuit was settled out of court, the plan approval became legally binding on 11 May 1981.

Construction began in 1980. The planned investment in 1984 was around DM 145 million (about €74 million, as of 1984). The third track is operated as a single track line. The idea of building it in a balanced middle position between the two existing tracks had been rejected.

Around DM 184 million was invested in the entire package of measures. The project was completed at the end of the 1980s with the exception of some finishing details. The cost of the third track was estimated at DM 71 million in 1989; DM 66 million of this was funded by the federal government.

==== 1987–1999 upgrade ====
A number of measures were envisaged within the scope of the further upgrades envisaged in the Federal Transport Infrastructure Plan of 1985: in addition to the provision of alignment improvements and the shortening of blocks, short overtaking loops, level crossings and slow points (especially in Würzburg Hauptbahnhof) were to be eliminated. New and extended substations were planned as well as reinforced power supply. The Linienzugbeeinflussung cab signalling and train protection system would be installed and a freight detour route (Würzburg–Ansbach–Nuremberg) would be developed. The cost of the project was estimated to be DM 272 million at 1985 prices.

The ABS 8/2 upgrade project was divided into three sections:

- On the 40.9 km-long section between Nuremberg and Neustadt (Aisch), worthwhile investments would raise the permissible speed by up to 30 km/h to 160 km/h. Exit speeds in Nuremberg Hauptbahnhof would be raised from 30–40 to 80 km/h by the installation of more gradual turnouts.
- The core of the project was the upgrading of the 28.8 km-long section between Neustadt (Aisch) and Iphofen. With 14 line improvements, a continuous top speed of 200 km/h would be achieved. Movements of 20 to 65 m were required at six curves and movements of at most 4 m were required at the remaining curves. In Neustadt (Aisch) station, the passing track would be extended to an effective length of 750 m. Four level crossings would be eliminated.
- On the 32.5 km-long and especially curvy section between Iphofen and Würzburg greater speed increases were not possible. On five sections, speed increases of 10 km/h to 140 km/h were intended. In Kitzingen station, the effective length of the passing track would be extended to around 750 m.
- In Würzburg Hauptbahnhof, exit speeds for long-distance trains to Nuremberg would be increased from 40 to 60 km/h and parallel entry options from Nuremberg and Bamberg would be created.

The preliminary plans for the project was submitted to the Bundesbahn headquarters on 31 May 1987 and planning approval was granted on 18 November 1988. Completion was scheduled for 1996. Work on the line began with a formal groundbreaking ceremony on 3 April 1992 and was scheduled to be completed by 1997. Upgrade works in Würzburg Hauptbahnhof had begun as early as 1989.

As a result of line improvements, the speed in the section between Neustadt (Aisch) and Iphofen was raised by 40 to 60 km/h to 200 km/h by May 1999; this also required the installation of the Linienzugbeeinflussung system. At the same time measures were taken to increase the entry and exit speeds at Würzburg Hauptbahnhof. The improvements allowed a travel time reduction for long-distance traffic of about seven minutes.

Away from the high-speed section, smaller increases in speed were realised, for example, by raising the cant up to 160 mm, minor changes to transition curves and shifts of tracks of up to 60 cm. In the area of Elgersdorf (line-kilometres 19.6 to 20.5) the line was moved by up to 25 m. The maximum speed on the section was raised to 140 km/h.

As part of the upgrade, Markt Bibart station was equipped with two external platforms and a crossover and a turnback track were built for commuter trains. With the widening of a curve (km 47, previous radius: 1095 m), the maximum speed was raised from 140 to 200 km/h. The existing central passing loop was removed during reconstruction in 1992/1993. An overtaking facility to be provided as a replacement (with two overtaking tracks) near Oberlaimbach has not been realised (as of 2015). A passing loop with an effective length of 750 m was built between the main tracks at Markt Einersheim.

Plans to install the Linienzugbeeinflussung system on the high-speed section to increase capacity have not been implemented. An extension of the high-speed section would have made the Linienzugbeeinflussung system here unusable. The investment in the high-speed section was about DM 160 million (about €80 million, 1999 prices), with a travel time reduction of about three minutes. About DM 75 million (about €38 million) was invested in the other measures, with a travel time reduction of about one and a half minutes.

Due to a lack of funding, plans for further upgrading of the line estimated to cost €140 million were abandoned at the end of 2004.

==== New Aurach viaduct ====
The Aurach viaduct in Emskirchen was rebuilt from May 2014 to November 2016. This 527.5 m-long and 40 m-high bridge made of reinforced concrete replaced the old bridge and lies about 90 m north of it. The route was changed over a length of 1.75 km. The solution had been identified in an EU-wide planning competition. An improvement in the alignment allowed speeds over the new bridge to be raised from 110 to 140 km/h for conventional trains and from 140 to 160 km/h for tilting trains.

==== Planned new alignment ====
The list of "urgent needs" identified in the Federal Transport Plan of 1992 included a new line between Iphofen and Rottendorf as part of proposed upgrades on the Hanau–Nantenbach/Würzburg–Iphofen route, which were estimated to cost DM 1.495 billion. The 24 kilometre-long new line would run off the existing line west of Rottendorf station and initially pass under a ridge through the 3.5 km-long Galgenberg Tunnel, pass over an overtaking loop at Biebelried and cross the Main on a nearly 800 m-long bridge south of Kitzingen. Near Markt Einersheim the new line would connect with the section towards Neustadt (Aisch) / Nuremberg, which is designed for 200 km/h operations. The route, which was originally designed for 300 km/h and later for 250 km/h operations, would shorten the travel times between Iphofen and Würzburg by a third, from around 20 minutes to 13 minutes, as several tight bends, especially between Kitzingen and Würzburg and near Iphofen, do not currently allow high speeds. The estimated cost was DM 840 million. The existing line between Rottendorf and Iphofen would have only been used for Regional-Express service after the planned commissioning of the new line in 2003. The new line would have been used by 109 long-distance passenger and freight trains each day and each way.

The affected communities opposed the building of the planned new line during consultations around 2001. The main argument put forward was that it crossed the drinking water protection area of the Franconia water supply. Also, the estimated cost of DM 850 million and the ecological sensitivity of the areas crossed by the proposed line were emphasised.

Due to a decline in traffic, preliminary work the project around 2000 was not pursued.

=== Extra tracks between Nuremberg and Fürth ===
A groundbreaking ceremony was held on 10 August 2006 for the building of two extra tracks between Nuremberg and Fürth to provide four tracks. This is a €162 million project related to the Nuremberg–Erfurt high-speed line project and the extension of the Nuremberg S-Bahn to Forchheim. While the bulk of passenger traffic will continue to be carried on two tracks, a new track is necessary for freight traffic in order to create capacity for the S-Bahn.

A third track has been available between Nuremberg and Fürth for the S-Bahn since 18 December 2010. All four tracks have been in use since 21 November 2011

==== S-Bahn ====
In the course of the second stage of the Nuremberg S-Bahn (planning status: 1981), it was planned to establish S-Bahn operations on the section between Fürth and Siegelsdorf, which would be upgraded. In addition, planning investigations were carried out in 1987. These plans have not been implemented so far (as of 2013). An upgrade to three tracks between Siegelsdorf and Fürth is planned in the Federal Transport Infrastructure Plan for 2030.

Electronic interlockings were opened in Siegeldorf and Emskirchen 2014, so that only the Neustadt–Altmanshausen section is not controlled by such interlockings.

== Services ==
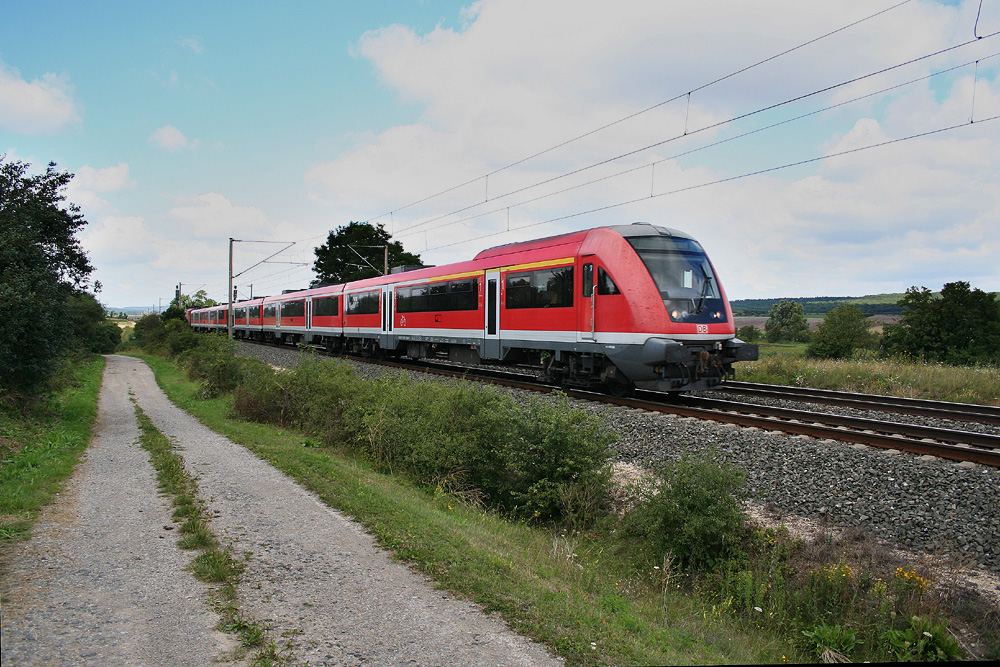
Deutsche Bahn modus EMU, running as RegionalExpress Franken-Express between Nuremberg and Würzburg, near Markt Bibart.

=== Long-distance ===
In long-distance traffic, the Intercity-Express line 25 (Munich–Hamburg) operates every two hours and line 41 (Munich–Ruhr district) every hour. In addition, services from Frankfurt to Vienna were greatly expanded in December 2007, with ICE-T services running every two hours from Frankfurt (some continuing from Dortmund) to Vienna and vice versa. The InterCity train pair, Rottaler Land, running from Hamburg to Passau and Mühldorf, unlike the other long-distance trains, also stopped in Neustadt (Aisch) on Saturdays until December 2014. Different ICE classes are used for the three ICE services; Intercity services are mostly operated as push–pull trains hauled by Class 101 and Class 120 locomotives.

=== Regional and local transport ===
The former Franken-Express Regional-Express service ran hourly between Nuremberg and Würzburg. Until December 2006, the trains operated to/from Frankfurt (Main). The direct connections introduced for the summer timetable 2001 were split into two lines with the same interchange connections in Würzburg.

DB-Regio has operated Alstom Coradia Continental (class 440) sets under the brand name Mainfrankenbahn, which has existed since the timetable change 2010, as Regionalexpress services (between Nuremberg and Würzburg) and as Regionalbahn services (between Nuremberg and Neustadt (Aisch)). These sets are based in Würzburg.

Services are denser in the vicinity of Nuremberg. LINT sets run between Nuremberg and Siegelsdorf, continuing over the Zenn Valley Railway to Markt Erlbach.

A total of eight pairs of Regionalbahn services operate from Monday to Friday during peak hours between Kitzingen and Würzburg. These are operated with class 425 sets. Because both Regional-Express and Regionalbahn services stop at all stations in this corridor, there are services at 30-minute intervals at times.

With the Bayerische Eisenbahngesellschaft mbH (Bavarian Railway Company, BEG) putting operations on this line to tender, there has been some increase of services in the off-peak (especially in the evening and at the weekend).

The number of passengers on regional services on the line increased by 220 percent between 2003 and 2012 according to the Bayerische Eisenbahngesellschaft.

==== Tenders for public transport services ====
The Bayerische Eisenbahngesellschaft, which is responsible for procuring regional passenger services has awarded contracts for all Regional-Express and Regionalbahn services on the Nuremberg–Würzburg railway following the calling of tenders.

First, the operation of the so-called Nürnberger Dieselnetzes (Nuremberg diesel network)—which also includes the Regionalbahn service from Nuremberg to Neustadt (Aisch)—was advertised on 2 March 2005 and awarded to DB Regio AG on 21 October 2005. With a view to increasing the attractiveness of the service, LINT 41 diesel railcars were procured from Alstom Transport Deutschland, and regional trains were to be extended via Neustadt (Aisch) to Steinach (bei Rothenburg) and Rothenburg ob der Tauber. In addition, it was planned to uncouple portions of the trains in Siegelsdorf station and to let a portion run on the Zenn Valley Railway to Markt Erlbach. However, the portion working concept was rejected and instead additional Alstom Coradia Continental services were commissioned. The integration of the services was not possible because not enough diesel vehicles were available. The contract began in December 2008 and has a term of ten years.

The Nuremberg–Würzburg Regional-Express service was tendered by the Bayerischen Eisenbahngesellschaft as part of the E-Netzes Würzburg (Würzburg electric network) on 7 June 2006. A DB Regio subsidiary won the tender and started operations in December 2009 with new electric railcars. The new contract includes an increase of 132,000 train-kilometres per year, so that a continuous hourly service would be offered until 11 pm. Under the E-Netz Würzburg contract, the new services on the Nuremberg–Würzburg line started in December 2009 and services on the remaining routes started in December 2010 and will all end in December 2021.

==== Fare zones ====
When the Verkehrsverbund Großraum Nürnberg (Greater Nuremberg Transport Association, VGN) was established on 27 September 1987, the line between Nuremberg and Neustadt an der Aisch was in its tariff area, it was extended to Markt Bibart on 31 May 1992, to Iphofen on 10 December 2006, to Kitzingen on 9 December 2007 and lastly to Dettelbach Bahnhof on 1 September 2016. Between Iphofen and Dettelbach the line lay in the tariff area of Kitzinger Nahverkehrs-Gemeinschaft (Kitzing local transport association, KiNG), until the district of Kitzingen joined the Verkehrsunternehmens-Verbund Mainfranken (Main-Franconia transport association, VVM) on 1 February 2009 after years of coordination problems. Until the beginning of the year, VVM fares was valid from Rottendorf station. The Dettelbach Bahnhof–Markt Bibart section is now located in the areas of both the VGN and the VVM.
