= Rottendorf =

- Municipality
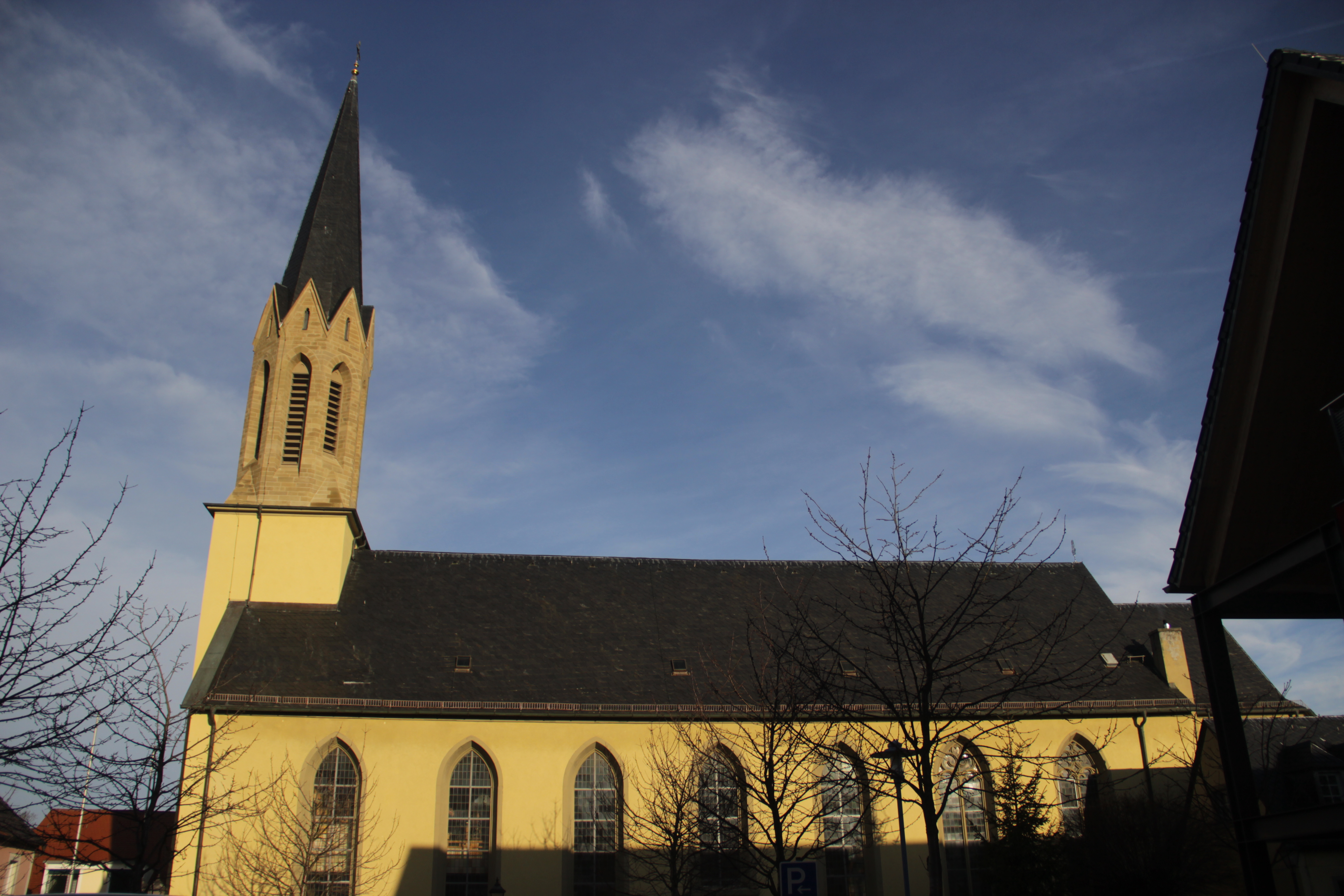
- Church of Saint Vitus

- Coat of arms

- Location of Rottendorf within Würzburg district
- Interactive map of Rottendorf
- Location within Germany Location within Bavaria
- Coordinates: 49°47′26″N 10°01′36″E
- Country: Germany
- State: Bavaria
- Admin. region: Unterfranken
- District: Würzburg
- Subdivisions: 2 Ortsteile

Government
  - Mayor (2020–26): Roland Schmitt (CSU)

Area
  - Total: 14.83 km^{2} (5.73 sq mi)
- Elevation: 252 m (827 ft)

Population (2025-12-31)
  - Total: 5,271
  - Density: 355.4/km^{2} (920.6/sq mi)
- Time zone: UTC+01:00 (CET)
  - Summer (DST): UTC+02:00 (CEST)
- Postal codes: 97228
- Dialling codes: 09302
- Vehicle registration: WÜ
- Website: www.rottendorf.eu

Rottendorf is a municipality in the district of Würzburg in Bavaria, Germany.

== History ==
As part of the bishopric Würzburg (Stift Haug) Rottendorf was secularisized 1803 in support of Bavaria, then Archduke Ferdinand gave it 1805 from Preßburg in peace for the formation of the grand duchy Würzburg, with which it passed to Bavaria in 1814 finally.

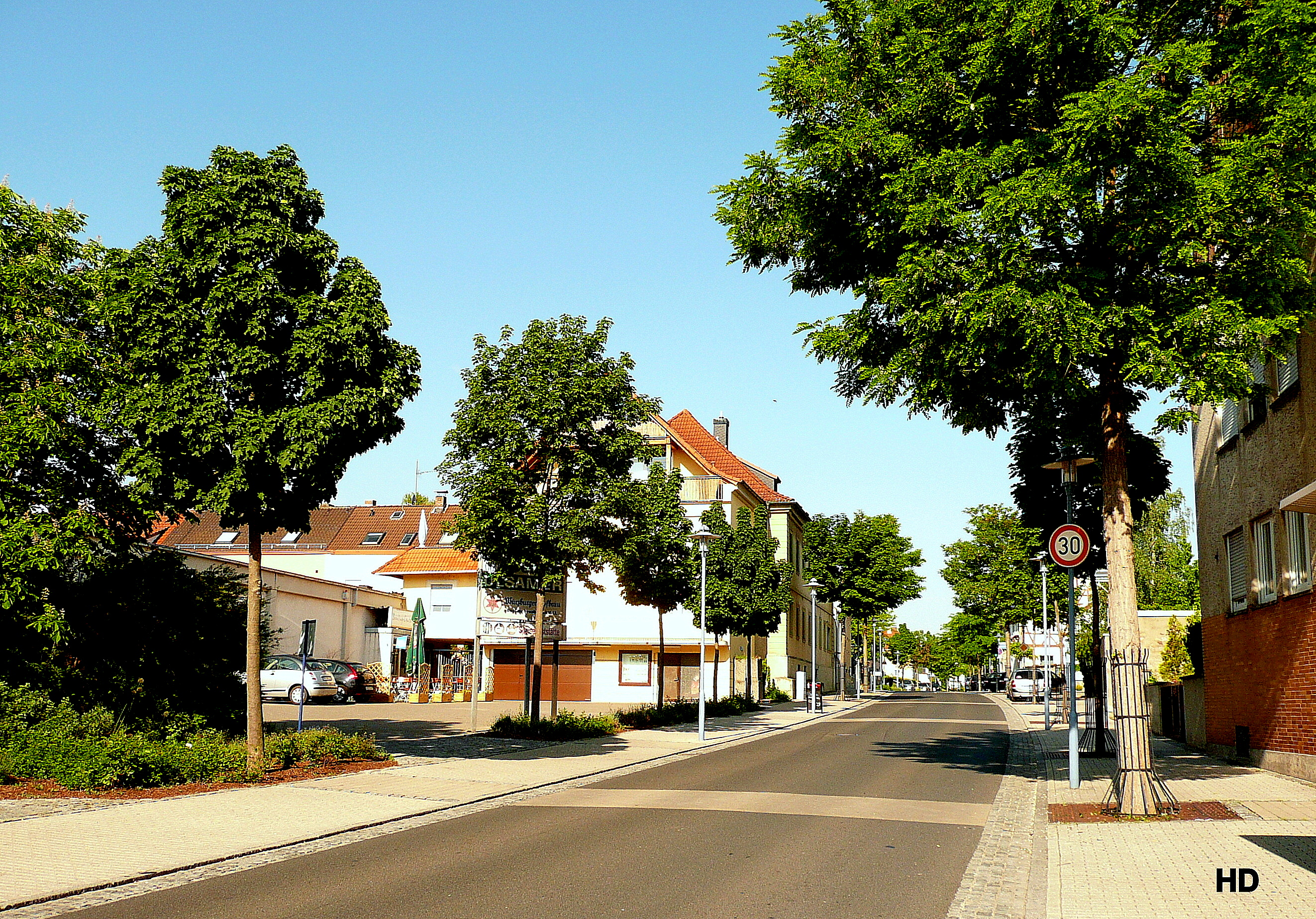
