= Steigkoppe =

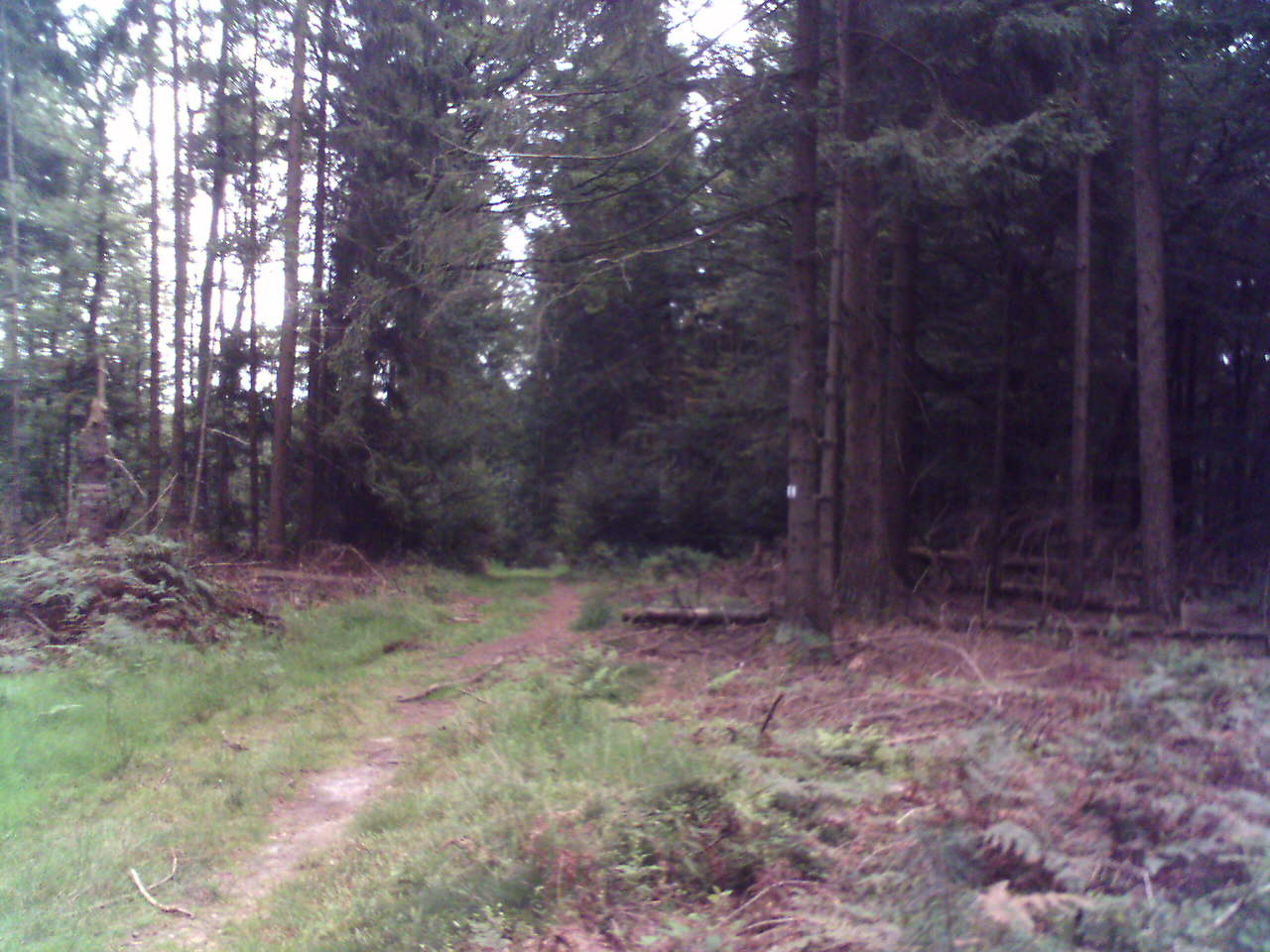
- Forest near the highest elevation

Highest point
- Elevation: 502 m (1,647 ft)
- Coordinates: 50°02′38″N 9°18′14″E

Geography
- Location within Bavaria
- Location: Bavaria, Germany
- Parent range: Spessart

Steigkoppe is a wooded hill in the Spessart range of Bavaria, Germany.

The 502 metres (1,647 ft) tall hill is located in the district of Aschaffenburg. More specifically, Steigkoppe is in the unincorporated area Sailaufer Forst between Laufach and Jakobsthal, part of Heigenbrücken.

The Eselsweg long-distance hiking path passes over the hill. There is also a district road (AB2) from Sailauf to Wiesen. South of the peak rises the Beibuschbach. To the west lies the source of the Sailaufbach.
