= Erlenbach =

Erlenbach may refer to several places:

== Switzerland ==
- Erlenbach, Switzerland, a Canton of Zurich
- Erlenbach im Simmental, a Canton of Berne

== Germany ==
- Erlenbach, Baden-Württemberg, a municipality in the district of Heilbronn, Baden-Württemberg
- Erlenbach bei Dahn, a municipality in Südwestpfalz district, Rhineland-Palatinate
- Erlenbach bei Kandel, a municipality in the district of Germersheim, Rhineland-Palatinate
- Erlenbach bei Marktheidenfeld, a municipality in the district Main-Spessart, Bavaria
- Erlenbach am Main, a town in the district of Miltenberg, Bavaria
- Nieder-Erlenbach, a borough of Frankfurt am Main, Hesse

=== Rivers ===
- Erlenbach (Enz), in Baden-Württemberg, tributary of the Enz
- Erlenbach (Jagst), in Baden-Württemberg, tributary of the Jagst
- Erlenbach (Bever), in North Rhine-Westphalia, tributary of the Bever
- Erlenbach (Hillersbach), in Hesse, tributary of the Hillersbach
- Erlenbach (Nidda), in Hesse, tributary of the Nidda
- Erlenbach (Nidder), in Hesse, tributary of the Nidder
- Erlenbach (Speyerbach), in Rhineland-Palatinate, headwater of the Speyerbach
- Erlenbach (Michelsbach), in southern Rhineland-Palatinate, tributary of the Michelsbach
- Erlenbach (Lauter), in southern Rhineland-Palatinate, tributary of the Lauter
- Erlenbach (Kahl), in Bavaria, tributary of the Kahl
- Erlenbach (Laufach), in Bavaria, tributary of the Laufach
- Erlenbach (Main), in Bavaria, tributary of the Main
- Erlenbach (Mindel), in Bavaria, tributary of the Mindel

== Other uses ==
- Erlenbach or Albé, a commune in the Bas Rhin département in Alsace
- SV Erlenbach, a German association football club Erlenbach am Main, Bavaria
- Erlenbach ZH railway station, in Switzerland
