= Schwarzkopf (Spessart) =

Mountain in Germany

- Location within Bavaria

Highest point
- Elevation: 460 m (1,510 ft)
- Coordinates: 50°00′55″N 9°22′20″E

Geography
- Location: Bavaria, Germany
- Parent range: Spessart

Schwarzkopf is a wooded hill located in the Aschaffenburg district of Bavaria, Germany. It is part of the Mittelgebirge Spessart. Schwarzkopf lies east of Laufach and south of Heigenbrücken. It is located in the unincorporated area Forst Hain im Spessart.

The long-distance hiking path Eselsweg passes over the hill. Schwarzkopf is also close to the Spessart Ramp of the Main-Spessart railway (Schwarzkopftunnel).
