= Seebach =

Seebach may refer to:

== Places ==
- Seebach, Baden-Württemberg, a town in the district of Ortenau in Baden-Württemberg in Germany
- Seebach, Wartburgkreis, a municipality in the Wartburgkreis district in Thuringia in Germany
- Seebach, Mühlhausen, a quarter of the town of Mühlhausen in Thuringia in Germany
- Seebach, Bas-Rhin, a municipality in the Département Bas-Rhin in France
- Seebach (Zürich), a quarter of the city of Zürich in Switzerland
- Zapoge, a settlement in the Municipality of Vodice in Slovenia

== Rivers ==
- Seebach (Unstrut), of Thuringia, Germany, tributary of the Unstrut
- Seebach (Usa), of Hesse, Germany, tributary of the Usa
- Seebach (Ismaning), of Bavaria, Germany, in Ismaning, tributary of the Isar
- Seebach (Laufach), of Bavaria, Germany, headwater of the Laufach
- Seebach (Regnitz), of Bavaria, Germany, tributary of the Rhine–Main–Danube Canal
- Obernberger Seebach, of Tyrol, Austria

== People ==
- Dieter Seebach (born 1937), German chemist
- Holger Seebach (1922–2011), Danish footballer
- Karl Seebach (1912–2007), German mathematician
- Karl von Seebach (1839–1880), German geologist
- Lothar von Seebach (1853–1930), Alsatian painter, designer, watercolorist and engraver
- Marie Seebach (1829–1897), German actress
- Nicolai Seebach (born 1977), Danish songwriter and music producer
- Tommy Seebach (1949–2003), Danish musician
- Rasmus Seebach (born 1980), Danish musician, son of Tommy Seebach
  - Rasmus Seebach (album), the debut album of Rasmus Seebach
