= Eichenberger Bach =

River in Germany

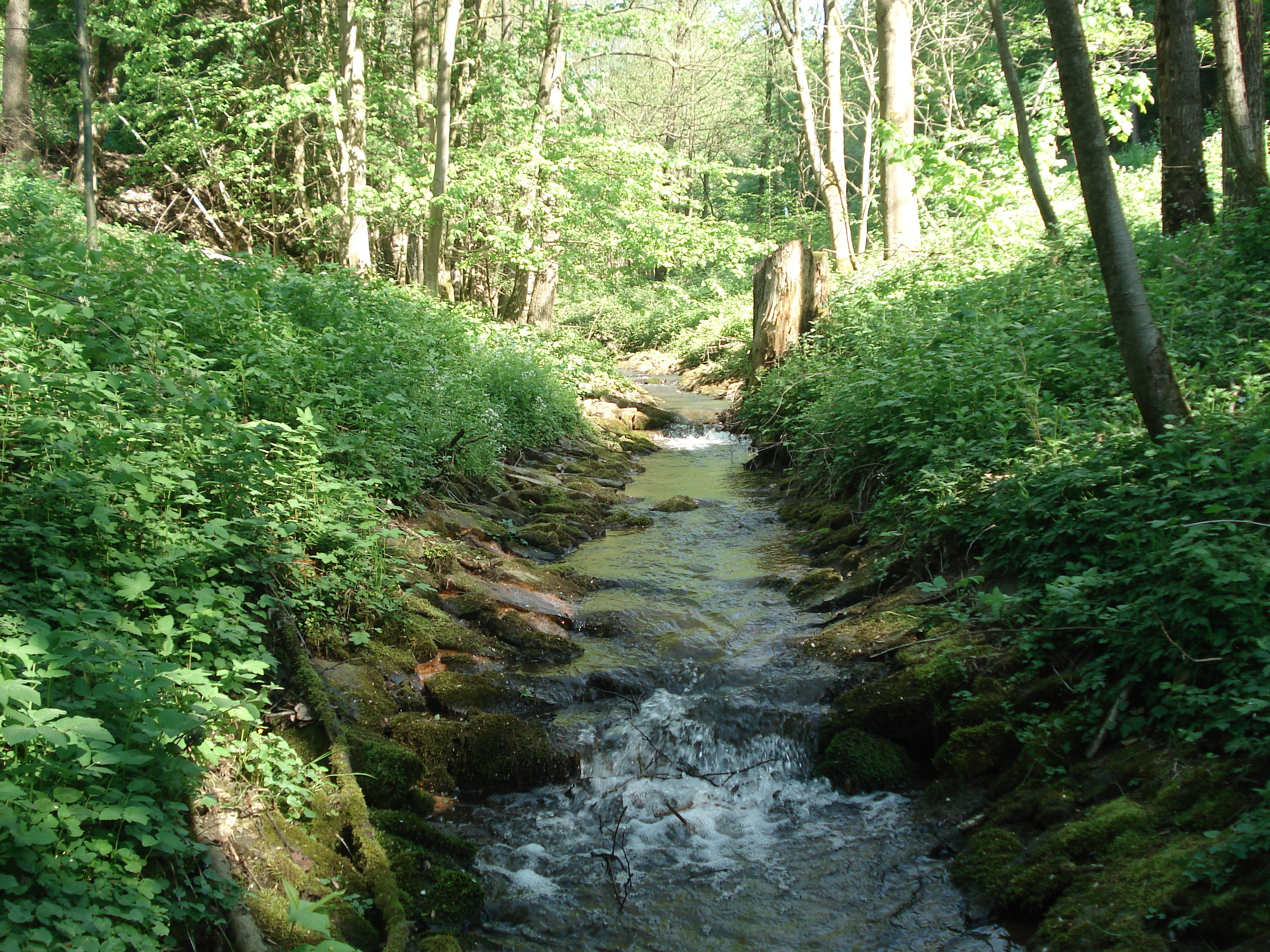
- The Eichenberger Bach between the two parishes Eichenberg and Sailauf of the village Sailauf

Location
- Country: Germany
- State: Bavaria

Physical characteristics
- Mouth
  - location: Sailaufbach
  - coordinates: 50.0236°N 9.2558°E
- Length: 1.2 mi (2 km)

Basin features
- Progression: Sailaufbach→ Laufach→ Aschaff→ Main→ Rhine→ North Sea

Eichenberger Bach is a small river of Bavaria, Germany. It flows into the Sailaufbach in Sailauf.

== See also ==
- List of rivers of Bavaria
