= Harrison & Harrison =

British pipe organ manufacturer

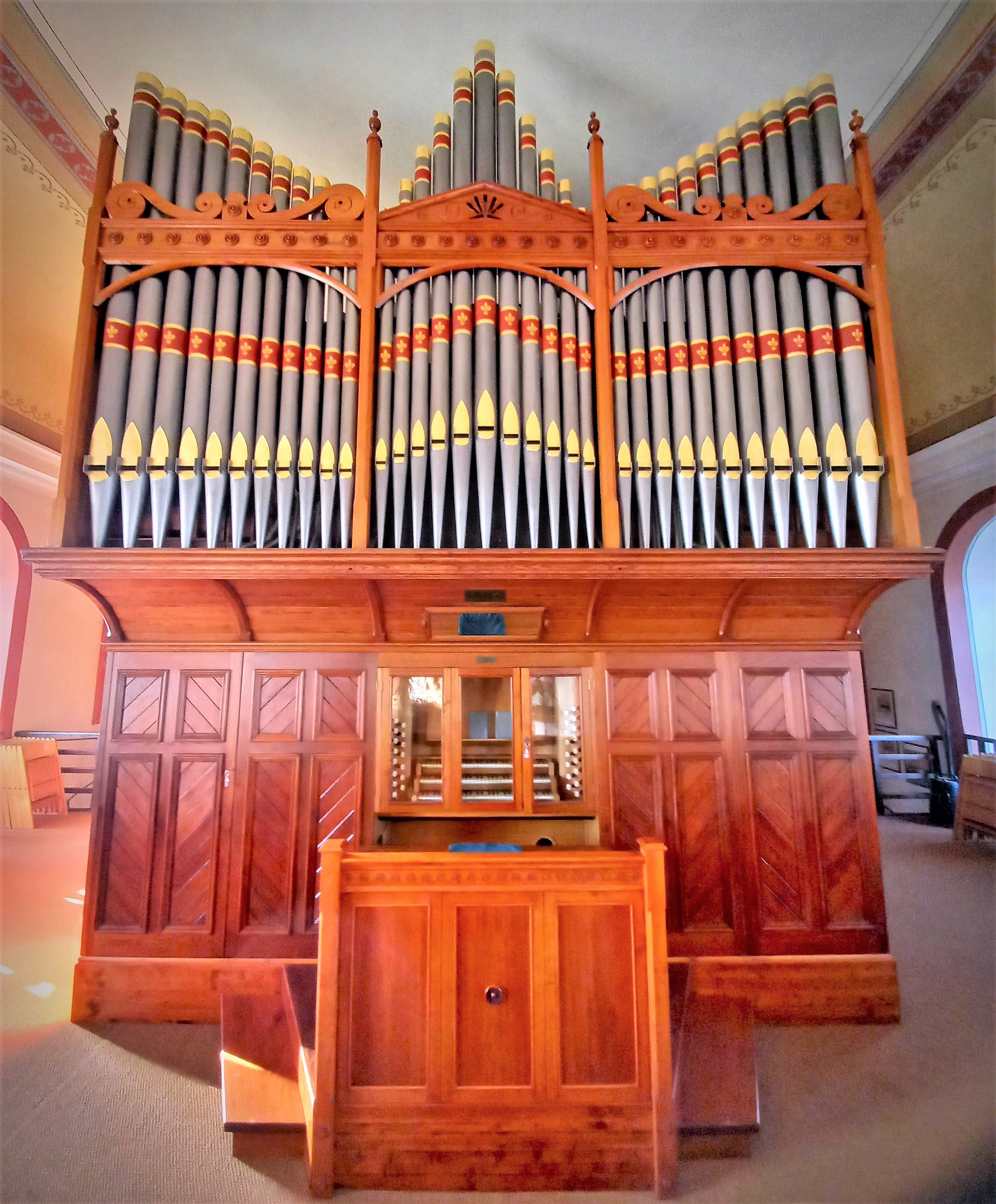
Pipe organ in Sailauf, Germany, built by Harrison & Harrison in 1902 for the Grove Road Methodist church in Harrogate, UK

Harrison & Harrison Ltd is a British company based in Durham that makes and restores pipe organs. It was established in Rochdale in 1861. It is well known for its work on instruments such as King's College, Cambridge, Westminster Abbey, and the Royal Festival Hall.

== History of the firm ==
Thomas Harrison established an organ building company in 1861 in Rochdale, then moved to Durham in 1872. The company was moderately successful but did not achieve real success until 1896 when Thomas's sons Arthur and Harry took over. Harry designed the organs and Arthur proved to be a particularly gifted voicer, resulting in commissions for rebuilds of several great organs including Durham Cathedral, the Grand Organ at the Royal Albert Hall and new commissions including Westminster Abbey, and Rossall School (1925). Between 1890 and 1996, Harrisons was located on Cross Street (now Hawthorn Terrace), Durham in a former paper mill. The building is now called Harrison House.

Arthur Harrison died in 1936 and Harry retired in 1946. The company passed to Harry's son Cuthbert. The firm was led by Mark Venning from 1975. David Hirst joined as Deputy Managing Director in 2008 and led the firm as Managing Director from 2009. In 2010, Mark Venning returned to maintain operations until the arrival of Dr Christopher Batchelor in 2011. The firm was run by Dr Batchelor from 2011 to June 2017. In October 2017, Andrew Reid left his job as Director of the Royal School of Church Music and joined Harrisons as the new managing director. In 2022, Andrew Scott took over as managing director, the first to work his way up through the firm from an apprenticeship. Mark Venning remains active as chairman.

In the postwar period Harrisons contributed significantly to the renaissance of classical organ building; their instruments for the Royal Festival Hall (designed in close collaboration with Ralph Downes) and St Albans Abbey (for Peter Hurford) are of particular importance. To those two landmark instruments may be added the organs of Coventry Cathedral, the chapel of Somerville College, Oxford and St George's Chapel, Windsor Castle, all of these instruments being built during the tenure of Cuthbert Harrison and under his direction.

Harrisons continued to innovate and push the boundaries of organ building, even as they maintained their traditional craftsmanship. In the late 20th century, the firm expanded its operations to include electronic and digital organs. They also worked to adapt their instruments to modern performance styles and spaces, designing organs for concert halls and recording studios.

Under the leadership of Mark Venning, the company continued to receive numerous commissions for high-profile instruments. These included the organs of several British cathedrals, and of King's College Chapel in Cambridge. Harrisons also worked on international projects, including the restoration of the organ in St. Stephen's Cathedral, Vienna, and the construction of a new organ for the National Concert Hall in Dublin. These builds were detailed in "The Harrison Story", recounting the history of the firm, was published in 1974 by Laurence Elvin.
