= Erlenbach (Laufach) =

River in Bavaria, Germany

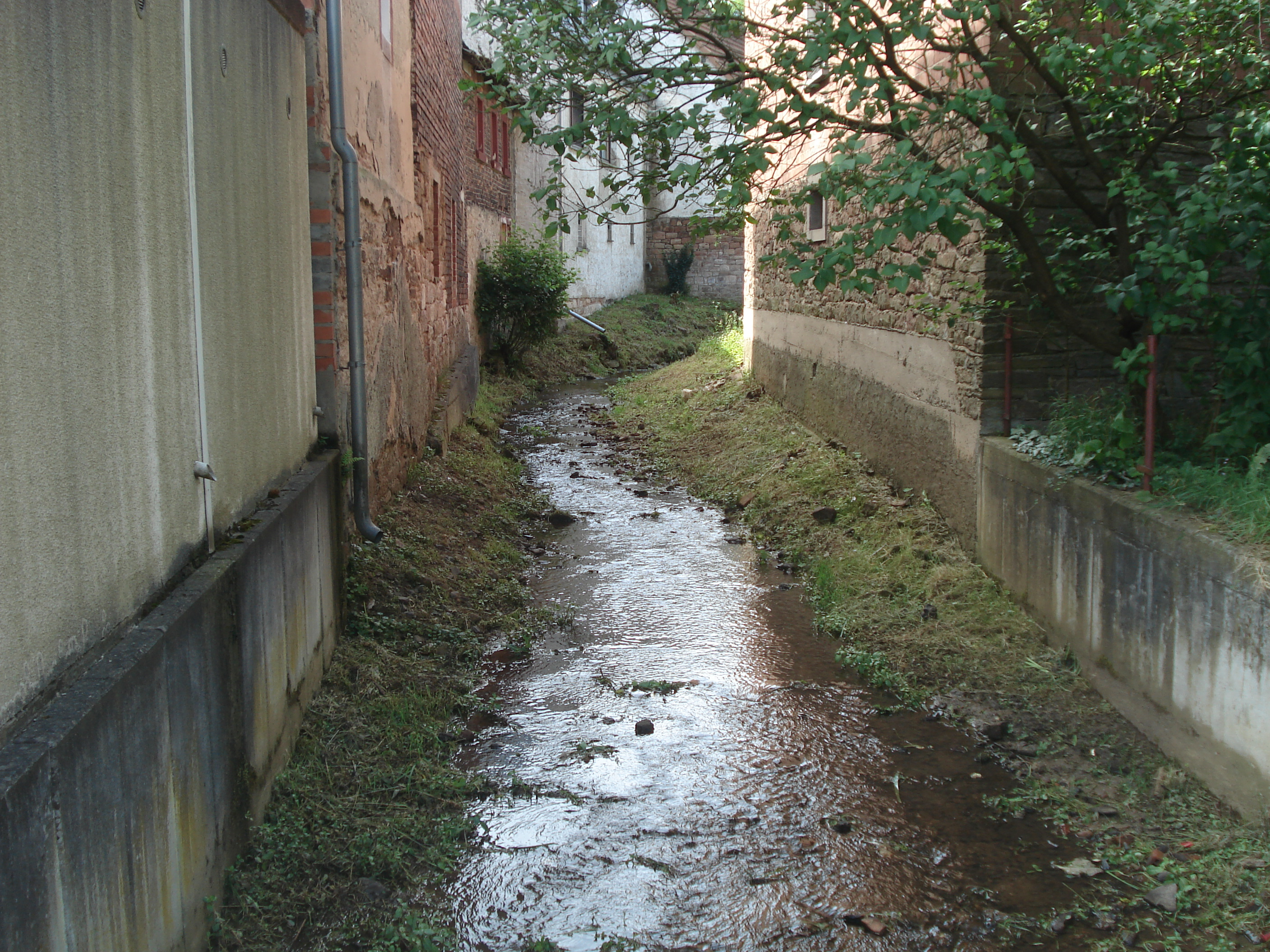
- The Erlenbach in Laufach

Location
- Country: Germany
- State: Bavaria

Physical characteristics
- Mouth
  - location: Laufach
  - coordinates: 50.0120°N 9.2949°E

Basin features
- Progression: Laufach→ Aschaff→ Main→ Rhine→ North Sea

Erlenbach (German: [ˈɛʁlənbax]) is a small river of Bavaria, Germany. It is a left tributary of the Laufach in the village Laufach.

== See also ==
- List of rivers of Bavaria
