= Seebach (Laufach) =

River in Bavaria, Germany

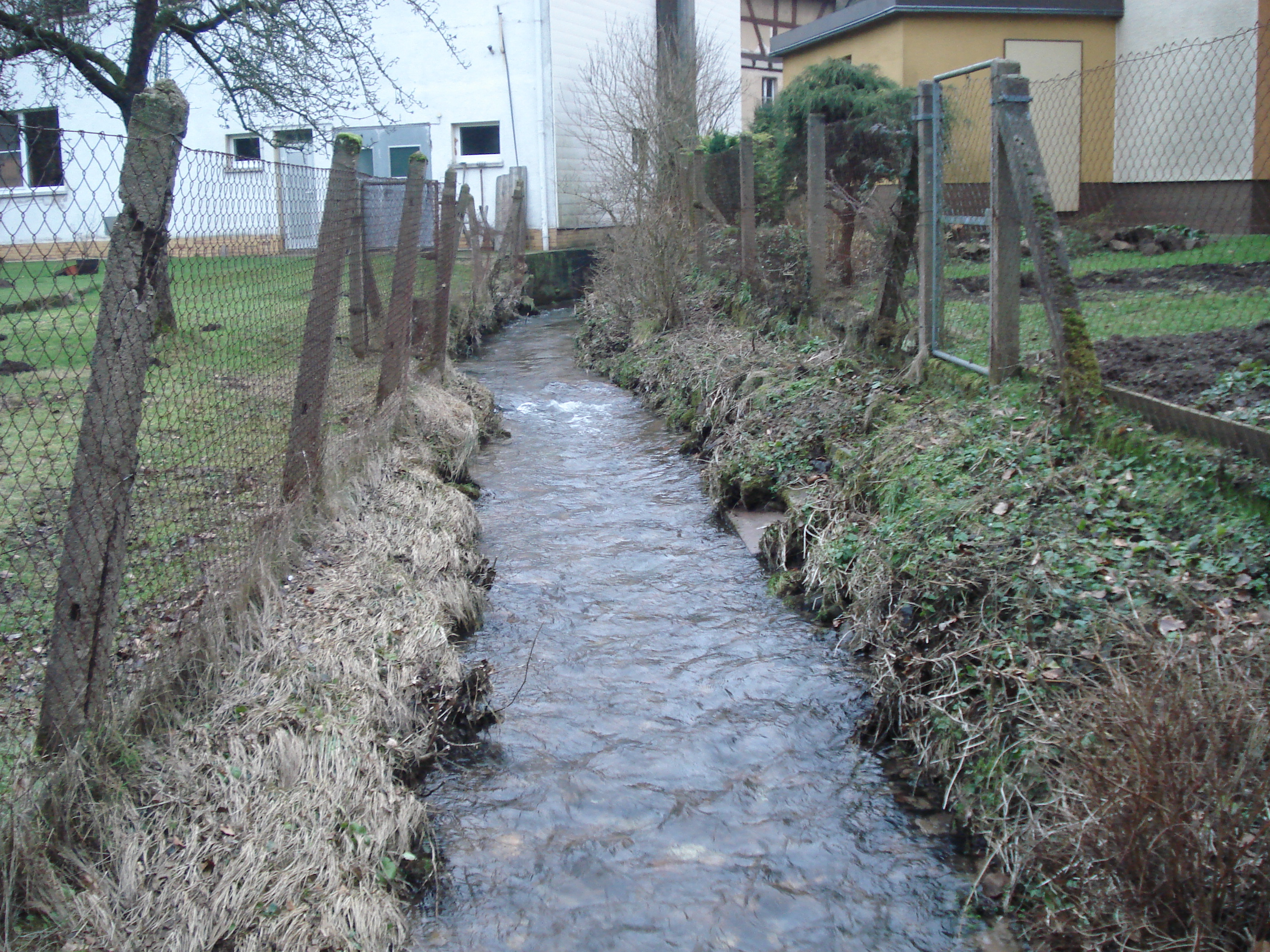
- The Seebach in Hain im Spessart, a borough of Laufach

Location
- Country: Germany
- State: Bavaria

Physical characteristics
- Mouth
  - location: Laufach
  - coordinates: 50.0109°N 9.3233°E

Basin features
- Progression: Laufach→ Aschaff→ Main→ Rhine→ North Sea

Seebach (German pronunciation: [ˈzeːbax]) is a small river of Bavaria, Germany. It is the left headwater of the Laufach in Hain im Spessart, a borough of Laufach.

== Geography ==
The Seebach rises from several springs in the Hain im Spessart forest, northwest of Rothenbuch at the foot of the Eselshöhe ridge, below Miesberg ( 470 m above sea level ) in the Miesgrund. It flows in a right-hand bend, initially westward and finally northward, flowing through several ponds and running past the Alte Forstmühle (Old Forestry Mill) to Hain im Spessart. On the right-hand slope of the valley, the federal highway B26 accompanies it on a long valley climb. Only below the mill does the Seebach emerge from the forest and pass under the viaduct of the Main-Spessart railway, which is popularly known as the Spessart Gate. In Hain im Spessart it then joins the Schwarzbach, coming from the east, from the left to form the Laufach, which flows westward.

== See also ==
- List of rivers of Bavaria
