= Steinknückl =

Coordinates: 49.99282°N 9.28202°E

Highest point
- Elevation: 413 m (1,355 ft)

Geography
- Location: Laufach, Germany
- Parent range: Spessart

Steinknückl is a low mountain in the Aschaffenburg district of Bavaria, Germany, on the western edge of the Spessart range of wooded low mountains. It is flanked by the communities of Laufach to the north and Waldaschaff to the south.

Its parent peak is the 460 m (1,510 ft) Schwarzkopf 7 kilometres (4.3 mi) to the east.
