= Sailaufbach =

River in Germany

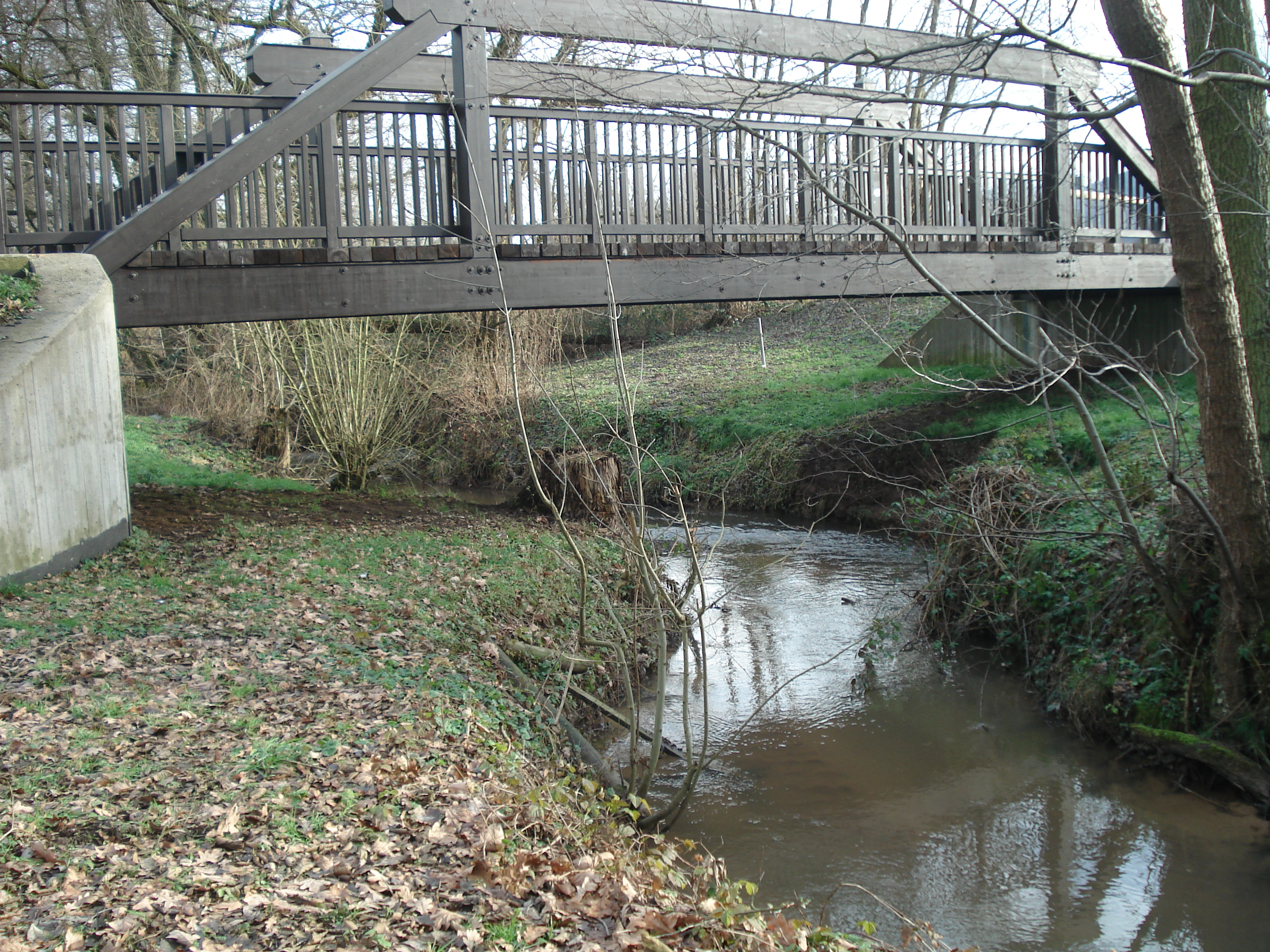
- The Sailaufbach at the Weyberhöfe

Location
- Location: Spessart Bavaria: Lower Franconia; District of Aschaffenburg
- Reference no.: DE: 2475442

Physical characteristics
- Source
  - location: in the Sailauf Forest west of the Steigkoppe
  - coordinates: 50°02′32″N 9°17′34″E
  - elevation: 312 m above sea level (NHN)
- Mouth
  - location: near the Weyberhöfe into the Laufach
  - coordinates: 50°00′19.50″N 09°14′18.32″E
  - elevation: 148 m above sea level (NHN)
- Length: 6.4 km
- Basin size: 17.4 km²

Basin features
- Progression: Laufach → Aschaff → Main (river) → Rhine → North Sea
- River system: Rhine
- Tributaries
  - right: Oberer Steinbach, Eichenberger Bach, Erlenbach
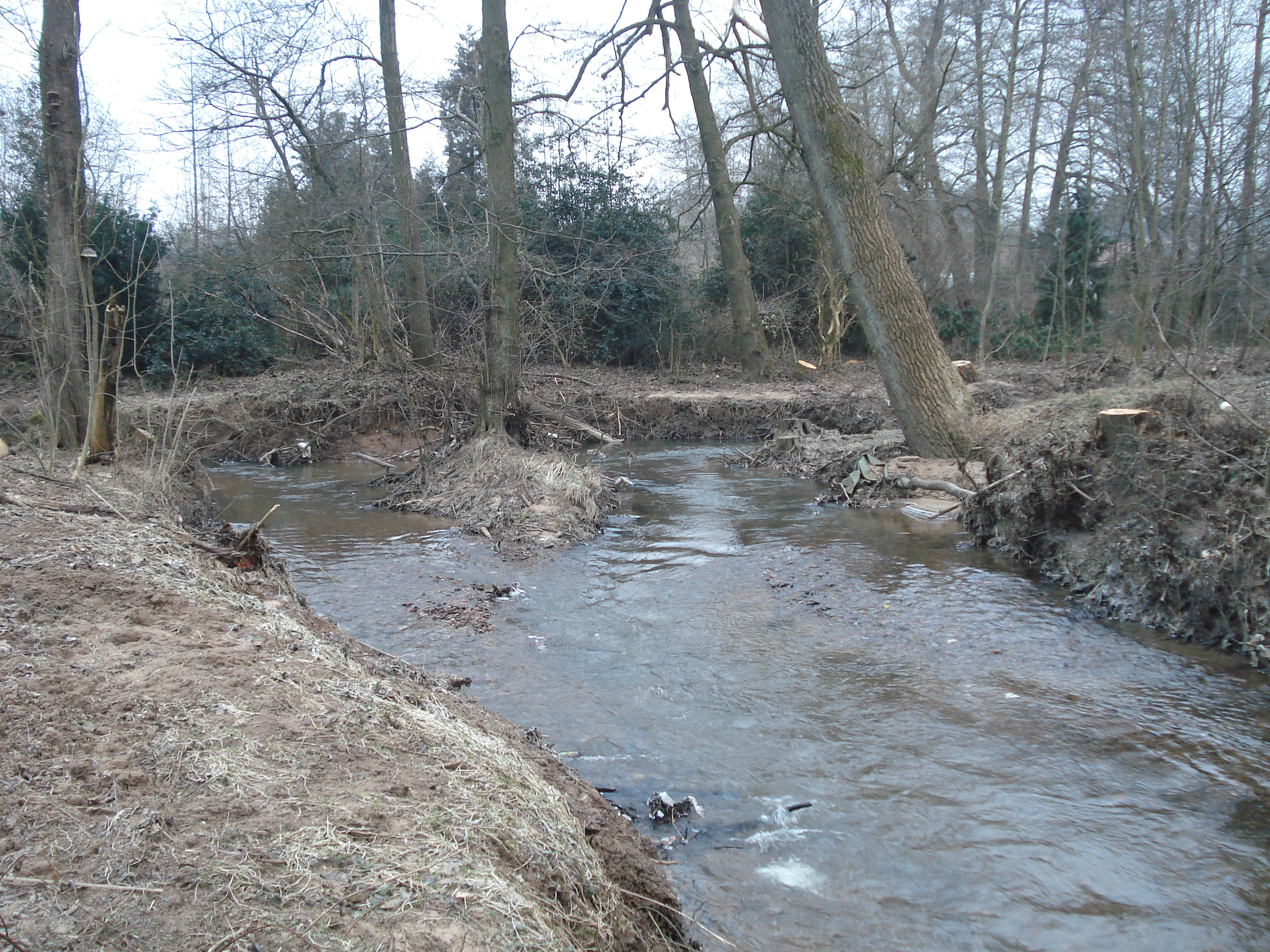
- The confluence of the Sailaufbach (left) into the Laufach (right)

The Sailaufbach is a stream in Bavaria, Germany. It flows in the low mountain range of the Spessart. It is a right-hand and northwestern tributary of the Laufach in the district of Aschaffenburg in Lower Franconia, flowing into the Laufach near Hösbach. It is 6.5 km long and the largest tributary of the Laufach.

== Name ==
The original name "Sailauf" comes from the Middle High German words sîgen and loufe, which mean descending watercourse. The stream gave its name to the village of Sailauf.

== Course ==
The Sailaufbach originates at an elevation of 312 m above sea level (NHN) at the base of the Eselshöhe ridge. Its source is located on the western slope of the Steigkoppe (502 m) within an exclave of the municipality of Sailauf in the Sailauf Forest.

The stream flows southwest close to the quarry where the arsenate mineral sailaufite was discovered. It then reaches Obersailauf, where it is joined by the Oberer Steinbach and flows through the village alongside the local AB 2 road. The Eichenberger Bach, its largest tributary, joins it in Mittelsailauf. (This tributary is mistakenly identified as the upper course of the Sailaufbach on some maps.)

The Sailaufbach continues through Untersailauf where the Erlenbach flows into it. Near the Weyberhöfe estates, it passes under the Bundesstraße 26 and flows into the Laufach river at an elevation of 148 m above NHN.

=== Cycle bridge ===
The cycle path bridge over the Sailaufbach near Weyberhöfe was replaced in 2024 with a steel bridge after the previous wooden bridge was found to be suffering from rot.

== History ==
=== Mills ===
Historical mills include:

- Mill in Obersailauf
- Wenzelmühle (Burkartsmühle)
- Bergmannsmühle
- Fuchsmühle (Wiesenmühle)
- Ölmühle

== Fauna ==
The Sailaufbach is home to brown trout and rainbow trout.

== See also ==
- List of rivers of Bavaria
