= Beibuschbach =

River in Germany

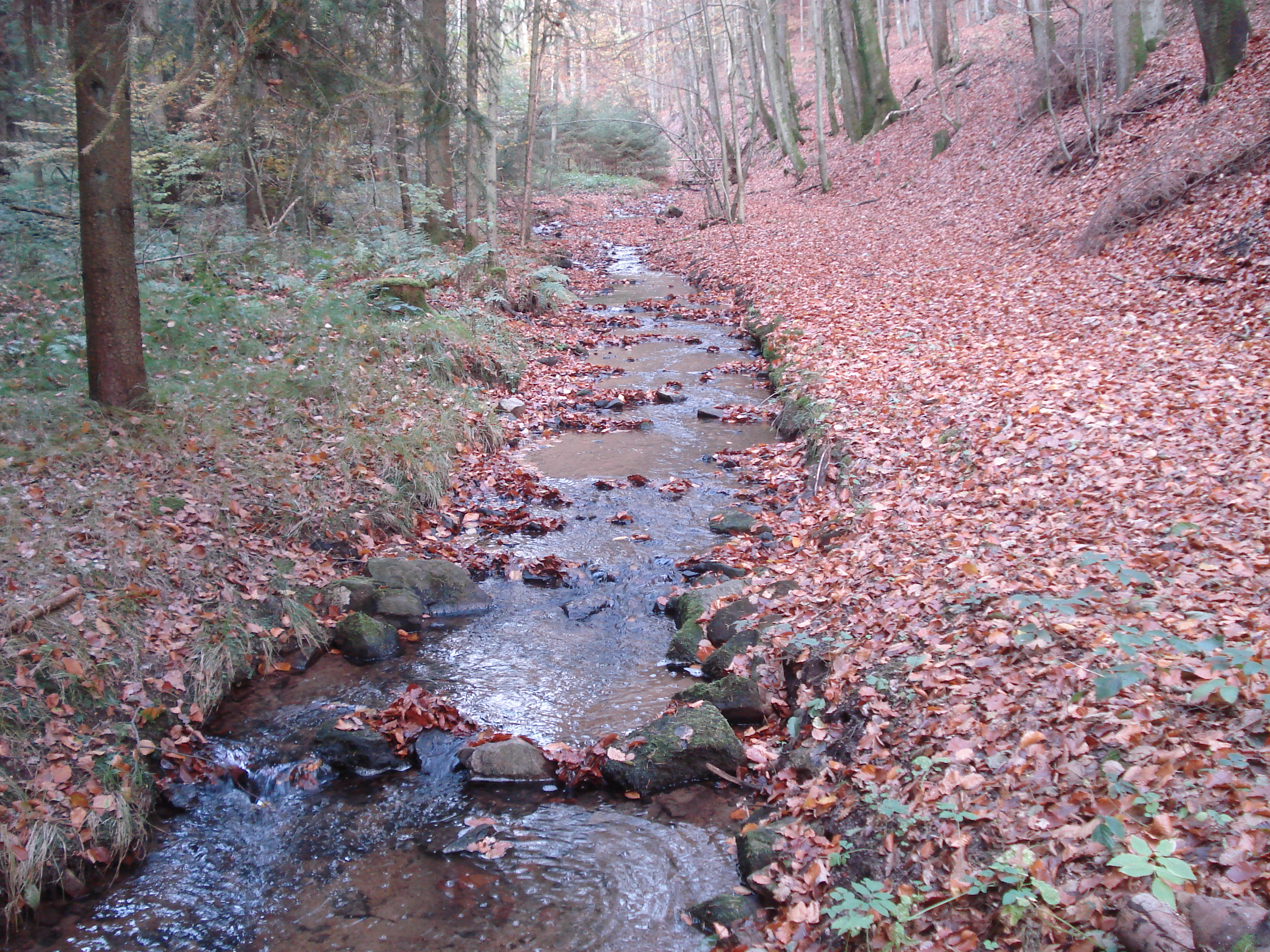
- The Beibuschbach in the wood north of Laufach

Location
- Country: Germany
- State: Bavaria

Physical characteristics
- Mouth
  - location: Laufach
  - coordinates: 50.0122°N 9.2954°E

Basin features
- Progression: Laufach→ Aschaff→ Main→ Rhine→ North Sea

Beibuschbach is a small river of Bavaria, Germany. It flows into the Laufach in the village Laufach. The river is 2.30 (3.7 km) long.

== See also ==
- List of rivers of Bavaria
