= Bavarian Gt 2×4/4 =

Class of German Mallet locomotives

Bavarian Gt 2×4/4 DRG Class 96^{0} DR Class 96^{0}
Model of a Gt 2×4/4 in H0 scale
Number(s):	K.Bay.Sts.B.: 5751–5765; DRG: 96 001–96 015	K.Bay.Sts.B.: 5766–5775; DRG: 96 016–96 025 ^{1}
Quantity:	15	10
Manufacturer:	Maffei	
Year(s) of manufacture:	1913/1914	1922/1923
Retired:	1936, 1940, 1944 - 1948, 1954	
Wheel arrangement (Whyte):	0-8-8-0	
Axle arrangement (UIC):	D'D h4vt	
Sub-class:	Gt 88.15	Gt 88.16
Track gauge:	1,435 mm (4 ft 8 1/2 in)	
Length over couplers:	16,900 mm (55 ft 5 in)	17,100 mm (56 ft 1 in)
Length over buffers:	17,500 mm (57 ft 5 in)	17,700 mm (58 ft 1 in)
Height:	4.65 m (15 ft 3 in)	4.55 m (14 ft 11 in)
Width:	3.15 m (10 ft 4 in)	
Wheel spacing:	1,500 mm (4 ft 11 in)	
Wheelbase:	4,500 mm (14 ft 9 in)	
Overall wheelbase:	12,200 mm (40 ft 0 in)	
Minimum curve:	180 m (590 ft 7 in)	
Empty weight:	99.4 t (97.8 long tons; 109.6 short tons)	105.4 t (103.7 long tons; 116.2 short tons)
Service weight:	123.2 t (121.3 long tons; 135.8 short tons)	131.1 t (129.0 long tons; 144.5 short tons)
Axle load:	15.4 t (15.2 long tons; 17.0 short tons)	16.4 t (16.1 long tons; 18.1 short tons)
Top speed:	50 km/h (31 mph), 40 km/h (25 mph) on 25‰ incline	
Indicated power:	1,470 PS (1,080 kW; 1,450 hp)	1,630 PS (1,200 kW; 1,610 hp)
Driving wheel diameter:	1,216 mm (3 ft 11.9 in)	
Valve gear:	Walschaerts (Heusinger)	
No. of cylinders:	4 (2 LP / 2 HP)	
LP cylinder bore:	800 mm (31 in)	
HP cylinder bore:	520 mm (20 in)	600 mm (24 in)
Piston stroke:	640 mm (25 in)	
Boiler:	2.46 m^{3} (87 cu ft) steam 8.43 m^{3} (298 cu ft) water	2.46 m^{3} (87 cu ft) steam 8.21 m^{3} (290 cu ft) water
Boiler overpressure:	15 bar (1,500 kPa; 220 psi)	
No. of heating tubes:	213	218; 147 (after rebuild)
No. of flues:	24	34
Heating tube length:	5.075 m (16.65 ft)	
Grate area:	4.25 m^{2} (45.7 ft^{2})	
Radiative heating area:	14.75 m^{2} (158.8 ft^{2})	14.65 m^{2} (157.7 ft^{2})
Tube heating area:	216.14 m^{2} (2,326.5 ft^{2})	185.78 m^{2} (1,999.7 ft^{2})
Superheater area:	55.39 m^{2} (596.2 ft^{2})	65.37 m^{2} (703.6 ft^{2})
Evaporative heating area:	230.89 m^{2} (2,485.3 ft^{2})	200.43 m^{2} (2,157.4 ft^{2})
Water capacity:	11 m^{3} (2,400 imp gal; 2,900 US gal)	12.3 m^{3} (2,700 imp gal; 3,200 US gal)
Fuel:	4 t (3.94 long tons; 4.41 short tons) coal (4.5 t (4.4 long tons; 5.0 short tons) rebuild)	5 t (4.9 long tons; 5.5 short tons) coal
Brakes:	Westinghouse compressed-air double brake	
Auxiliary brake:	Riggenbach counter-pressure brake	
Remarks:	^{1} techn. data after rebuild 1925/1926 (Serie 2)	

The Bavarian Class Gt 2×4/4 (bayerische Gt 2x4/4) engine of the Royal Bavarian State Railways (Königlich Bayerische Staats-Eisenbahnen or K.Bay.Sts.B.), was a heavy goods train tank locomotive of the Mallet type. It was later designated the DRG Class 96 (Baureihe 96) by the DRG, DB and DR.

== Description ==
The Gt 2x4/4 Mallet locomotive was equipped with two sets of compound-configured running gear, the front one, pivoted on a 15 cm thick coupling pin, had large low-pressure cylinders, and the rear one, which was fixed, had smaller high-pressure cylinders. Both had one driven and three coupled axles. The designer of this heavy locomotive was the then senior engineer and director at Maffei, Anton Hammel, (1857-1925), who had also developed the famous S 3/6. Between 1913 and 1914 the first series of 15 vehicles was procured and they entered service in 1914. The locomotives caused quite a stir at that time and could be seen at the railway exhibitions frequently held in those days (e.g. the 1922 transport exhibition in Munich) - and, like the S 3/6, they were often painted with a blue or ochre yellow photographic livery and adorned with a crowned chimney. As the first of the second series, no. 5766 (96 016) was even given brass bands on the crowned chimney and boiler as well as brass decorations on its front cylinders. A similar event happened with the same locomotive after the rebuilding of the second series in 1926. Otherwise, the first series had a narrow chimney with a cap similar to the Prussian P 8. The operational livery of the K.Bay.Sts.B. locomotives was green with yellow lettering and a black chassis.

Due to the advent of the Prussian T 20 (DRG Class 95) in 1922 with its 1'E1' axle arrangement and better qualities than the initial Gt 2x4/4 series, a second series was built and deployed between 1922 (no. 5766) and 1923 (nos. 5767–5775). They were improved in comparison with their predecessors: greater evaporative heating area, capable of holding half a ton of coal more, greater axle load and service weight, short chimney (without a cap). Both series were later modified in different ways after being taken over by the Deutsche Reichsbahn, and incorporated into its classification scheme as Class 96^{0}. All locomotives were equipped with a Westinghouse compressed-air double brake, operating on all wheelsets from the front, the sand pipes initially served the second and fourth wheelsets of the front drive. After the modification of the second series in 1926, they were additionally fitted with a Riggenbach counter-pressure brake, and seven axles sanded to increase adhesion. To begin with the locos ran with three headlights at the front, but just two after 1926.

== Rebuild ==
In 1925/1926 all the engines were rebuilt and strengthened, those of the first series being modified to a lesser extent (e.g. chimney enlargement, coal capacity increased from 4 to 4.5 t, boiler data, ride) than those of the second series. The following table shows the main changes that were made to second series:

- High-pressure cylinder extended from 520 mm to 600 mm diameter
- Blastpipe set lower and diameter increased
- Chimney widened and shortened a little
- Reduction in the number of heating tubes and increase in the number of smoke tubes
- Reduction in the total tube heating area
- Increase in the superheater area
- Installation of a feedwater heater (Oberflächenvorwärmer) in front of the stack
- Installation of a second air pump next to the first
- Installation of Riggenbach counter-pressure brake
- Increased coal bunker capacity from 4.5 t to 5 t
- Modified boiler fittings (sandbox, steam dome)
- Modifications to improve the ride ('slipping' of the front LP running gear)
- Sand pipes for 7 instead of 2 wheelsets
- Increase in adhesive weight from 123.2 to 131.1 Mp
- Increase in the centre coupled axle's axle load from 15.4 Mp to 16.4 Mp

== Area of operations ==
The locomotives were developed specially for the steep ramps in the K.Bay.Sts.B.'s territory: the railway line from Sonneberg–Probstzella, the Spessart ramp, the Franconian Forest Railway (Frankenwaldbahn), the Schiefe Ebene (lit: inclined plane), and the line from Eger to Asch (today Cheb-Aš). Its Mallet design at this size proved to have good traction and curve running on the tight mountain bends. The first test journey in 1914 took place on the route from Lichtenfels-Rothenkirchen. It was worth being able to mount the steep ramps in a much shorter time in order for the lines to generate a profit. In this role she was able to provide good service for up to 30 years and more, especially as a pusher locomotive, but also as the motive power for goods and passenger trains and reduced journey times by around 40%. The Mallet could manage an incline of 25‰ at 25 km/h hauling 465 tons, and could achieve a maximum of 40 km/h with lighter trains.

During World War I, when Germany occupied Belgium, four Gt 2x4/4 were briefly used as banking engines on the steep incline between Liège and Ans (29,9‰). However, they performed quite poorly and were soon withdrawn from this task.

Along with other high performance steam engines like the "H02 1001" and a coal dust-fired Prussian G 12 (DRG BR 58), loco no. 96 019 was to be seen at the world trade conference in Berlin-Tempelhof in 1930, where she was Germany's and Europe's heaviest Mallet tank locomotive. Quite a few locos were stabled in the locomotive depots (Bahnbetriebswerke or Bw) at Aschaffenburg, Neuenmarkt-Wirsberg and Rothenkirchen. Others were stationed at Munich and Eger.

== Retirement ==
Six machines (96 001, 96 003, 96 005, 96 007, 96 013, 96 014) were retired by 1945 and 96 015 was lost to military action. After 1945, nine engines of each series remained in the territory of the Deutsche Bundesbahn. They were stationed in Munich and Nuremberg and were retired in 1948 as a splinter class with fewer than 20 units. Of those, two machines, 96 002 and 96 024, went to the Deutsche Reichsbahn (East Germany) and until 1954 were on the books of the Stendal repair shop.

=== Models ===
No examples have survived - only two 1:10 scale models (1.82 m (6.0 ft) long) of prototypes in the second series, 96 016 and 96 025, can be seen in the Deutsches Museum at Munich and in the Nuremberg Transport Museum. They were built during the 1930s by students at the repair shed in Ingolstadt.

For many years Märklin offered an H0 model in different colour schemes and also a model in Z scale. An N gauge model has been available from Arnold.

A static model (unknown brand) was also offered as part of a collection series, presumably in HO scale.

=== Gallery ===
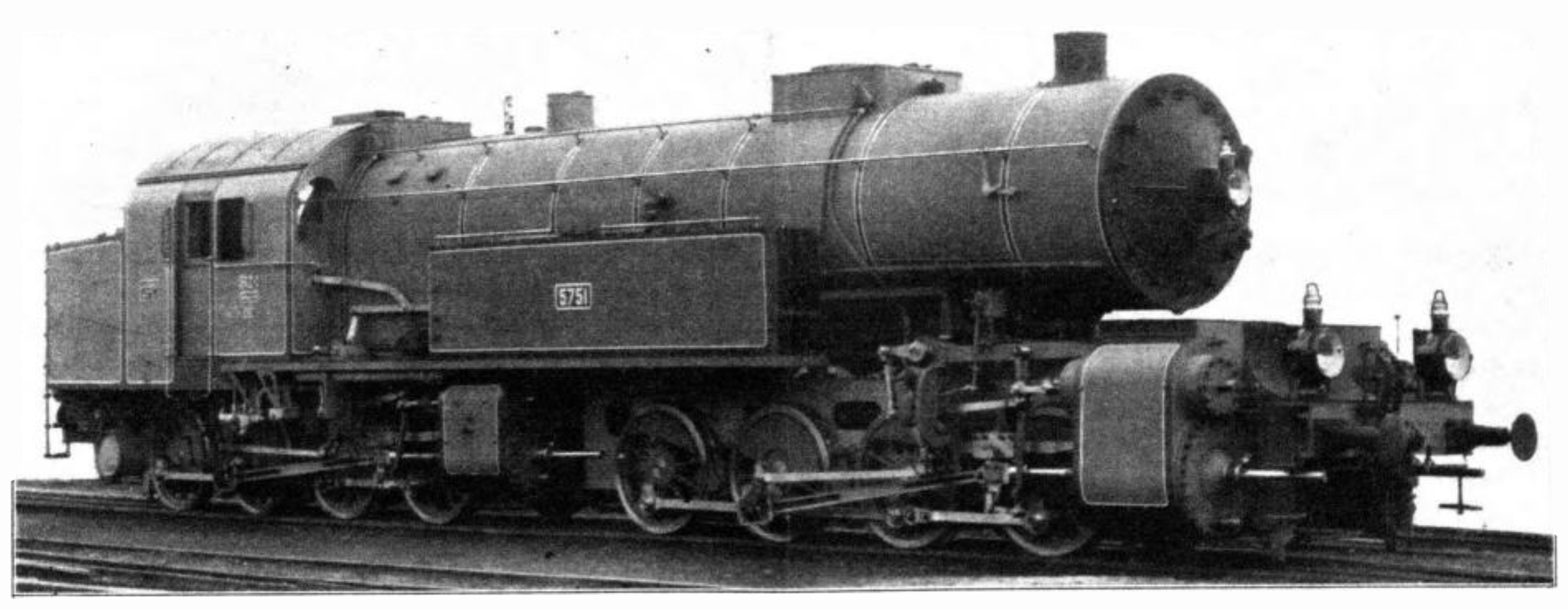
Bavarian Gt 2×4/4

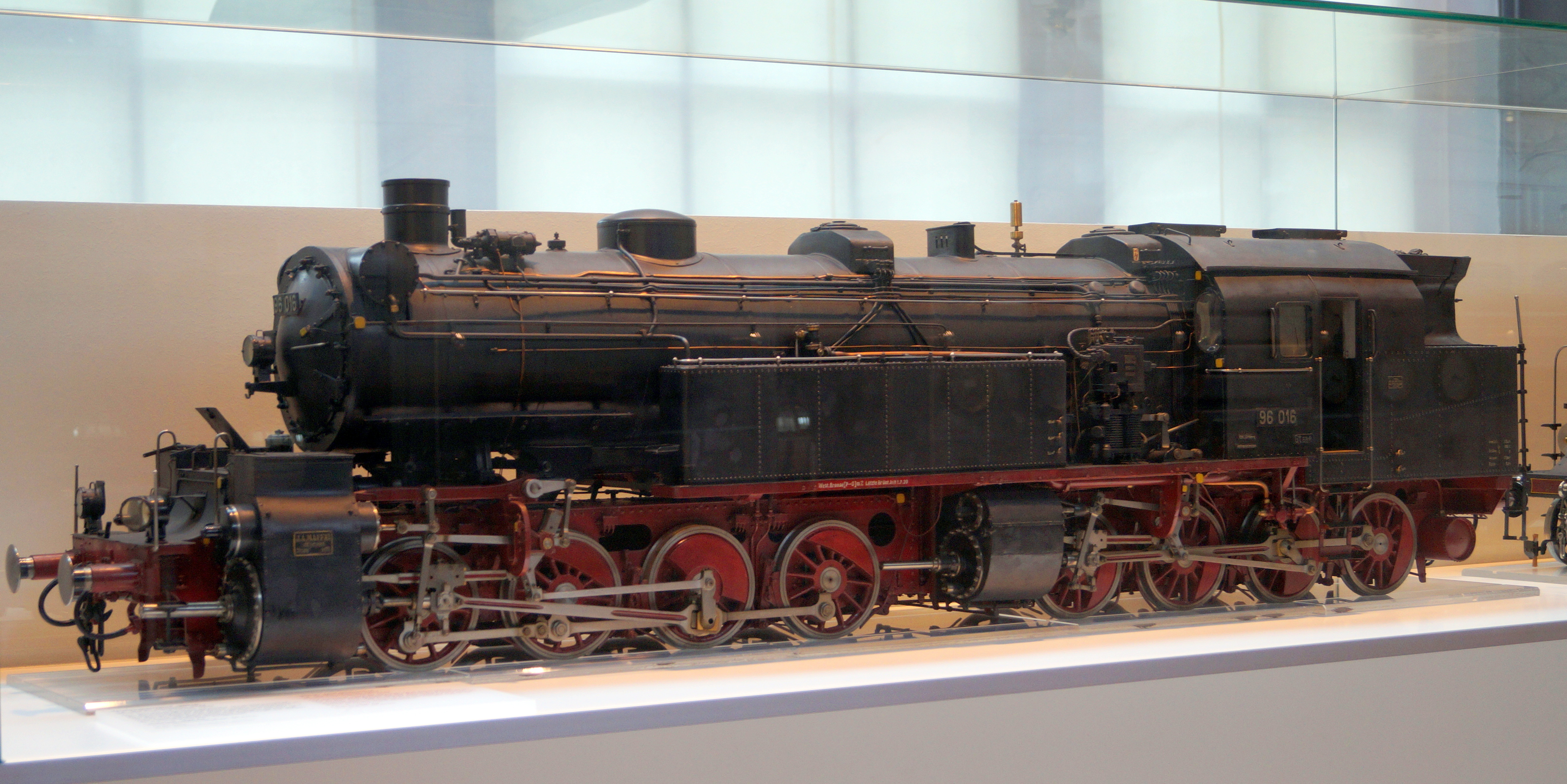
Baureihe 96 (Model)

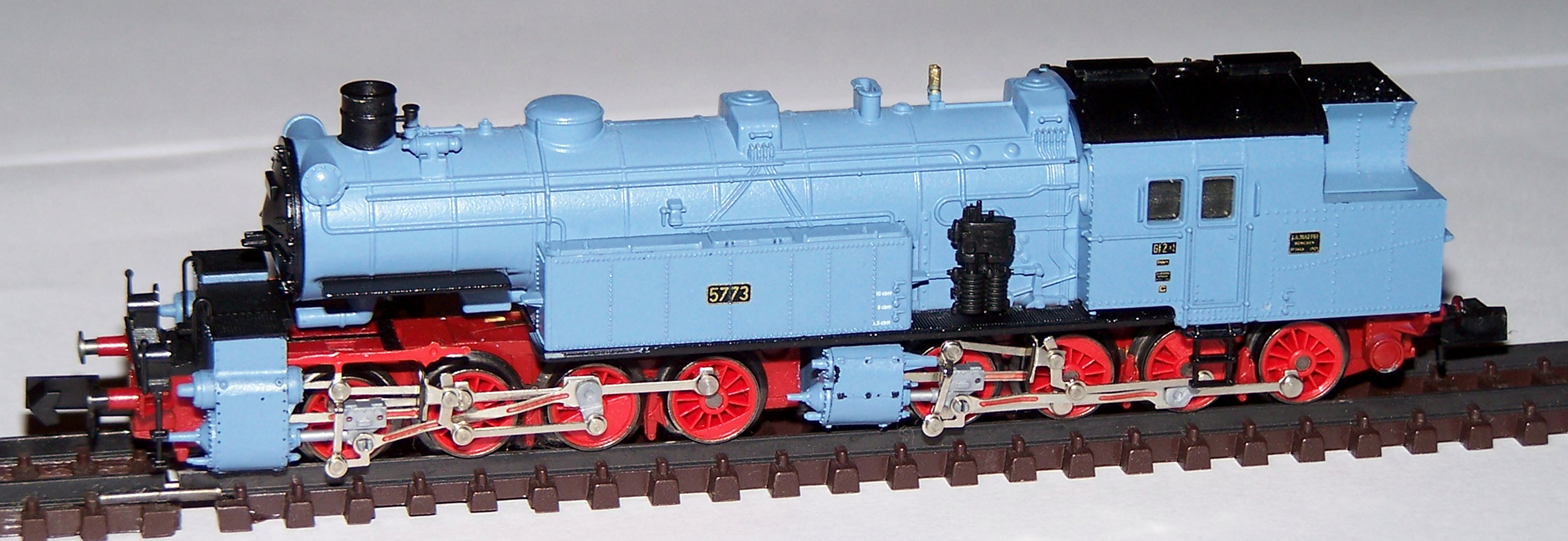
Model of a Gt 2×4/4 in N scale

== See also ==
- Royal Bavarian State Railways
- List of Bavarian locomotives and railbuses
