= Seebach (Regnitz) =

River in Germany

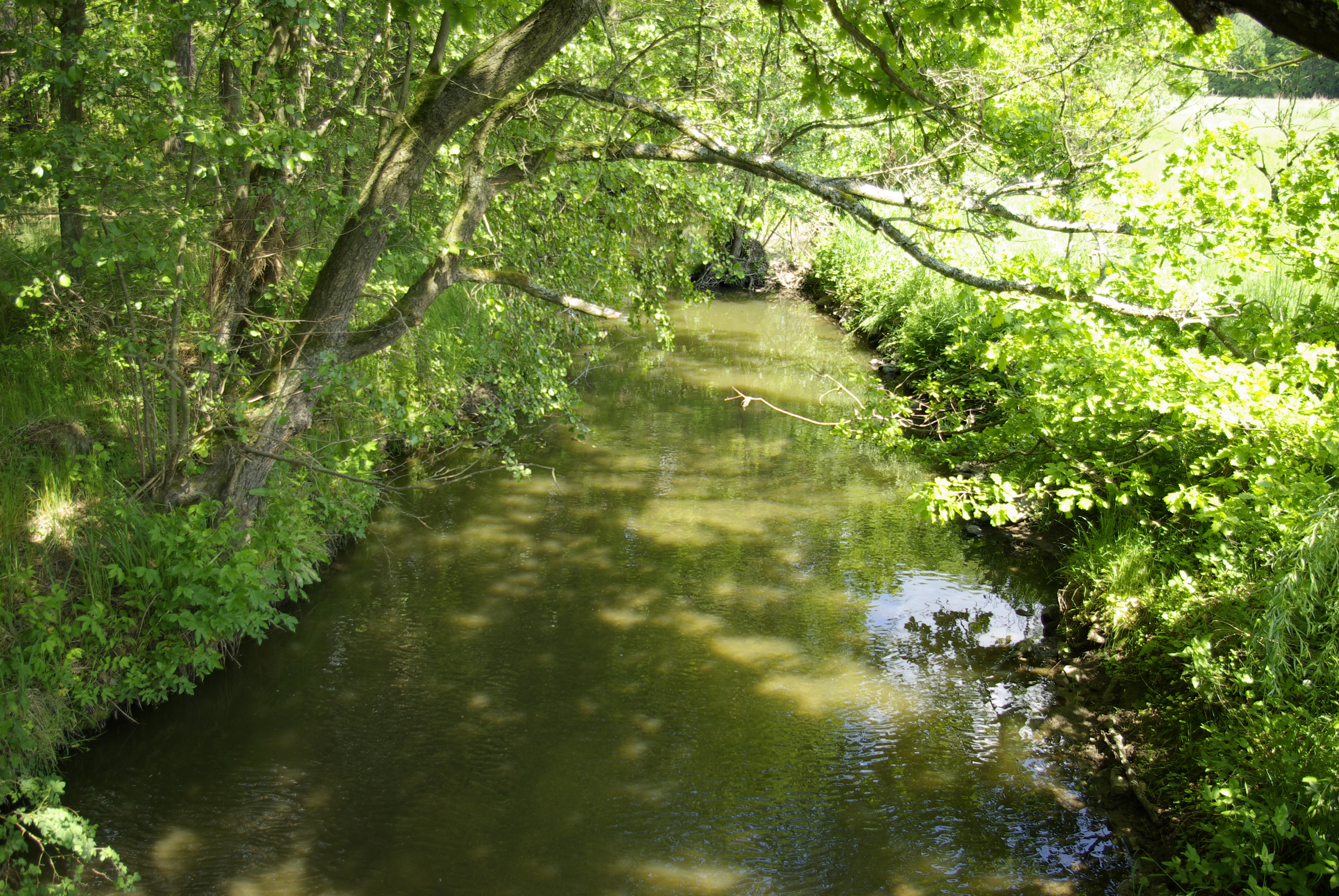
- The Seebach at Dechsendorf, Erlangen

Location
- Country: Germany
- State: Bavaria

Physical characteristics
- Mouth
  - location: Rhine–Main–Danube Canal
  - coordinates: 49.6476°N 11.0059°E
- Length: 22.5 km (14.0 mi)

Basin features
- Progression: Regnitz→ Main→ Rhine→ North Sea

Seebach (German pronunciation: [ˈzeːbax]) is a river of Bavaria, Germany.

The Seebach is a left tributary of the Rhine–Main–Danube Canal, which is connected with the Regnitz. Before the canal was built, it was a direct tributary of the Regnitz.

== See also ==
- List of rivers of Bavaria
