= Spessart Ramp =

Coordinates: 50°1′0″N 9°21′0″E

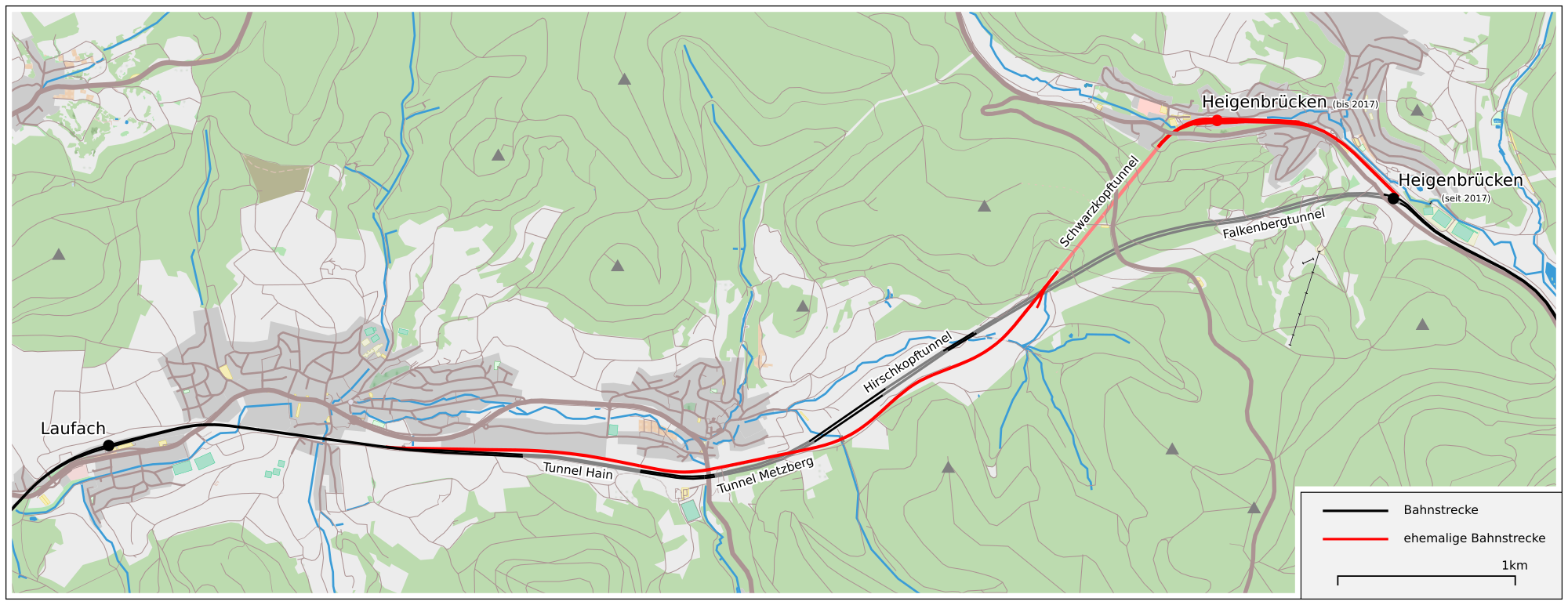
Map of the Spessart Ramp with the current and former routing

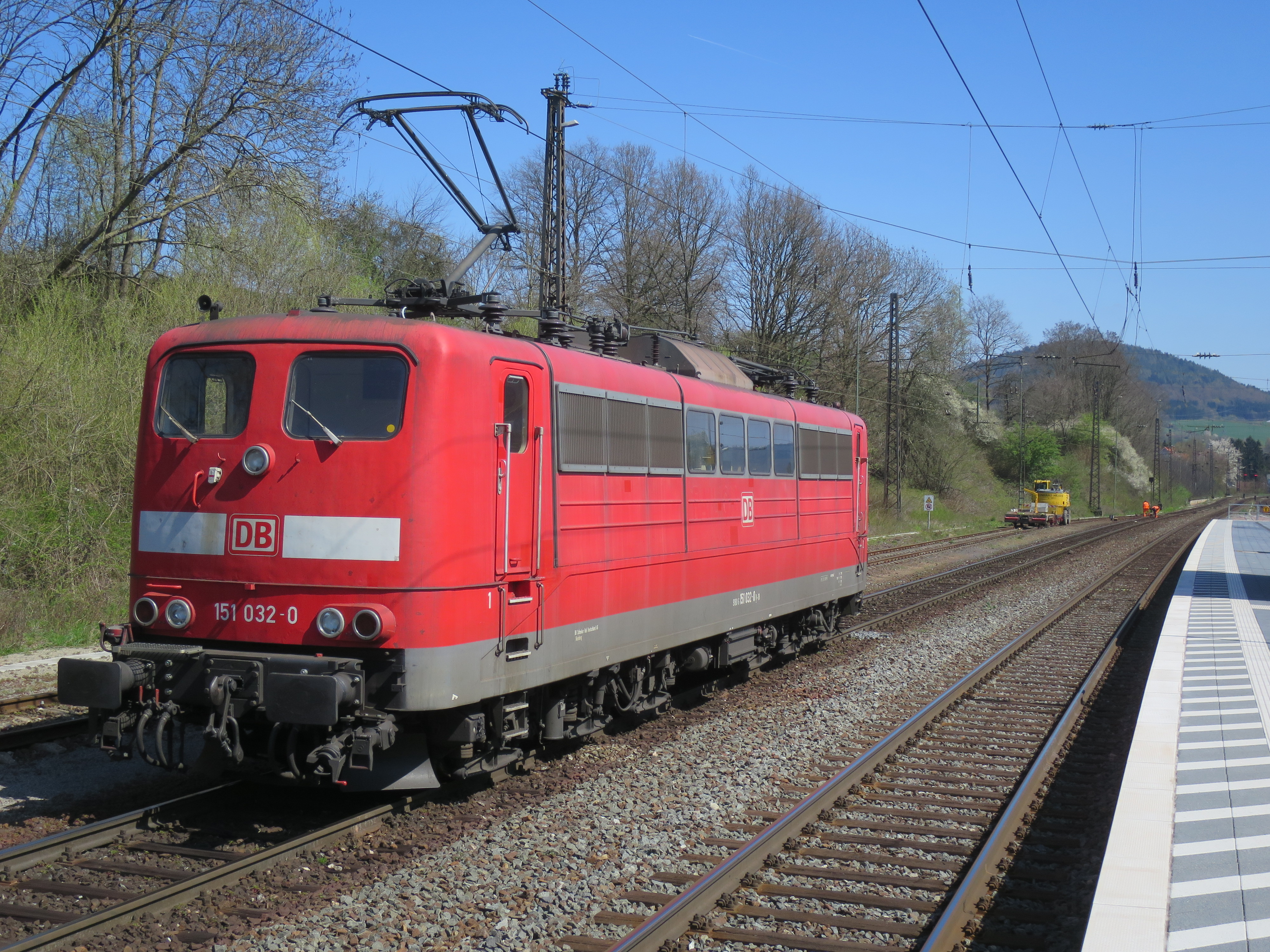
Push engine 151 032-0 at Laufach station

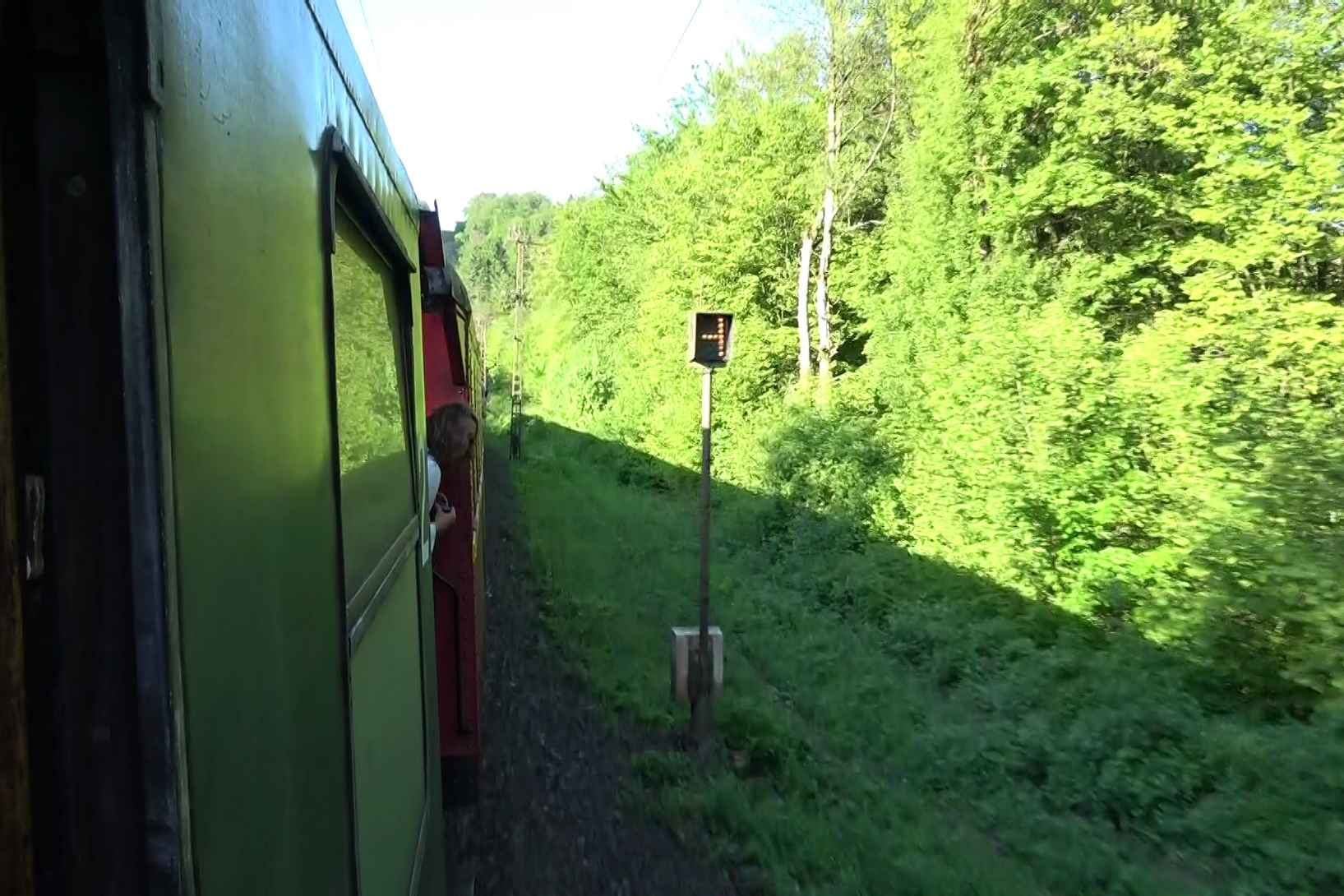
Signal Ts 1 (cut helper engine off) in a rare light signal version at the old Spessart Ramp near the Schwarzkopf Tunnel

The Spessart Ramp (German: Spessartrampe) is a 5.4 km long incline on the Main-Spessart Railway in southern Germany between Laufach at one end and the Schwarzkopf tunnel and Heigenbrücken at the other, with an average incline of 20 ‰. The ramp is part of Ludwig's Western Railway and the section from Würzburg via Aschaffenburg to the state border at Kahl am Main was opened on 1 October 1854 by the Royal Bavarian State Railways. The ramp enabled the difference in height between the Laufach valley and the Lohr valley to be overcome as it crossed the Spessart between Kahl am Main and Aschaffenburg on the one side and Würzburg/Bamberg on the other.

In keeping with the philosophy for railway construction at that time it was decided that the way to cope with large differences in height was the construction of a relatively short, steep section of line and to haul trains up the incline with the aid of banking locomotives, whilst the remaining section of the route could be made relatively level. A structure using the same concept is the Schiefe Ebene between Neuenmarkt-Wirsberg and Marktschorgast, which was built between 1844 and 1848 as part of the Ludwig South-North Railway. The Spessart Ramp, together with the adjoining Schwarzkopf tunnel had been double-tracked in 1854, whilst the remaining parts of the line between Kahl am Main and Würzburg were not doubled until the 1890s. The Spessart Ramp was electrified in 1957. During the steam locomotive era, heavy goods trains were frequently hauled up the ramp at just 6 km/h.

In 1914 the legendary 0-8-8-0 Mallet locomotives, the Bavarian Gt 2x4/4s (later DRG Class 96) arrived as banking engines for the Spessart Ramp. Later they were replaced by Prussian T 16.1 (DRG Class 94.5-17) which remained in service until 1957, and also sometimes by the Prussian T 20s (Class 95s). From 1957 to autumn 1987 the Class E 94.2s (194.5) took on the banking duties. These were replaced from late 1987 to 2003 by the DB Class 150, that have been in operation there briefly in 1957 for a few weeks as pushers. Since 2003 the DB Class 151 has performed the banking task.

Because the Deutsche Bahn does not push the goods trains of private railway companies for competition reasons, since 2004 the Mittelweserbahn has stationed locomotive number 1020 041 ( ex ÖBB, known as Krokodil) at Laufach for the goods trains of private railways. As a result, an example of Class E93/E94 has returned after a break of many years to banking duties on the Spessart Ramp.

== New ramp ==
In August 2006 the German Federal Transport Ministry gave financial approval for the construction of a new, less steep, double-tracked line with 4 tunnels. Construction started in 2009 at a cost of €240 million (2006 estimate) and was expected to be completed by 2014. The main tunnel is the 2,600 m long Falkenberg tunnel, which joins the existing line on the eastern side of Heigenbrücken. After the new line entered service, the old route was closed.

=== Commissioning new building / decommissioning old building ===
Test and acceptance drives took place from April 2017. The last freight train, which operated on the Spessart Ramp with the Schiebelokomotiven stationed in Laufach (151 012 and 151 164), drove in the morning of June 15, 2017, as the last scheduled train on the old Spessart Ramp the same day at noon the ICE 621 from Dortmund to Nuremberg with the railcar 403 028.

From 15 to 19 June 2017, the new Spessart Ramp was linked to the existing network as part of a total blockage and the new Heigenbrücken breakpoint was put into operation. From June 24 to 26, 2017, the second track except Laufach station was put into operation. This left a short single-track section until November 6, 2017.

After commissioning the new line, the provision of Schiebelokomotiven was abandoned in Laufach. As far as particularly heavy freight trains, which at the time required two Schiebelokomotiven, nevertheless still need a push, they should receive a firmly coupled to the train locomotive, which is usually provided in Frankfurt (Main) East.

Due to a remaining 760 m long ramp with a gradient of 20 ‰ in the eastern station entrance of Laufach, multiple freight trains stuck that did not carry a second locomotive.

== See also ==
- Schiefe Ebene
- Geislinger Steige
