= Erlenbach (Mindel) =

River in Germany

- The Erlenbach at Burgau

Location
- Country: Germany
- State: Bavaria

Physical characteristics
- Mouth
  - location: Mindel
  - coordinates: 48.4561°N 10.4000°E
- Length: 14.2 km (8.8 mi)

Basin features
- Progression: Mindel→ Danube→ Black Sea

Erlenbach (German: [ˈɛʁlənbax]) is a river of Bavaria, Germany. It is a right tributary of the Mindel in Mindelaltheim.

== See also ==
- List of rivers of Bavaria
