= Sailauf =

- Municipality
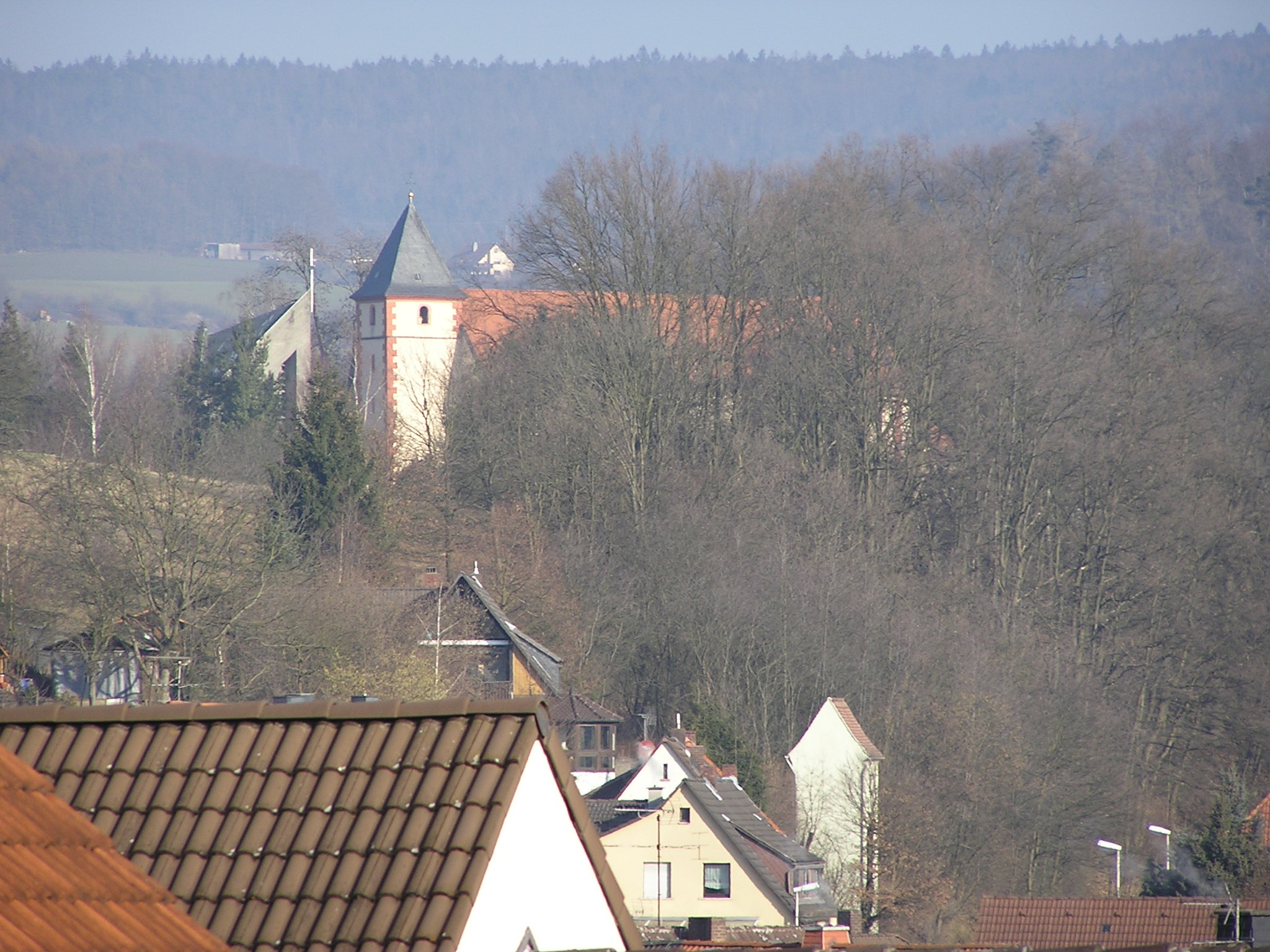
- Sankt Vitus-Kirche in Sailauf

- Coat of arms

- Location of Sailauf within Aschaffenburg district
- Interactive map of Sailauf
- Location within Germany Location within Bavaria
- Coordinates: 50°01′N 09°15′E
- Country: Germany
- State: Bavaria
- Admin. region: Unterfranken
- District: Aschaffenburg

Government
  - Mayor (2020–26): Michael Dümig (SPD)

Area
  - Total: 13.82 km^{2} (5.34 sq mi)
- Elevation: 200 m (660 ft)

Population (2025-12-31)
  - Total: 3,591
  - Density: 259.8/km^{2} (673.0/sq mi)
- Time zone: UTC+01:00 (CET)
  - Summer (DST): UTC+02:00 (CEST)
- Postal codes: 63877
- Dialling codes: 06024 und 06093
- Vehicle registration: AB
- Website: www.sailauf.de

Sailauf is a municipality in the Aschaffenburg district in the Regierungsbezirk of Lower Franconia (Unterfranken) in Bavaria, Germany. It has a population of around 3,600.

== Geography ==
=== Location ===
Gemeindeteile

The municipality lies in the area of the Spessart (range) known as Vorspessart near Aschaffenburg. It is located on the Sailaufbach, a tributary of the Laufach.

=== Subdivisions ===
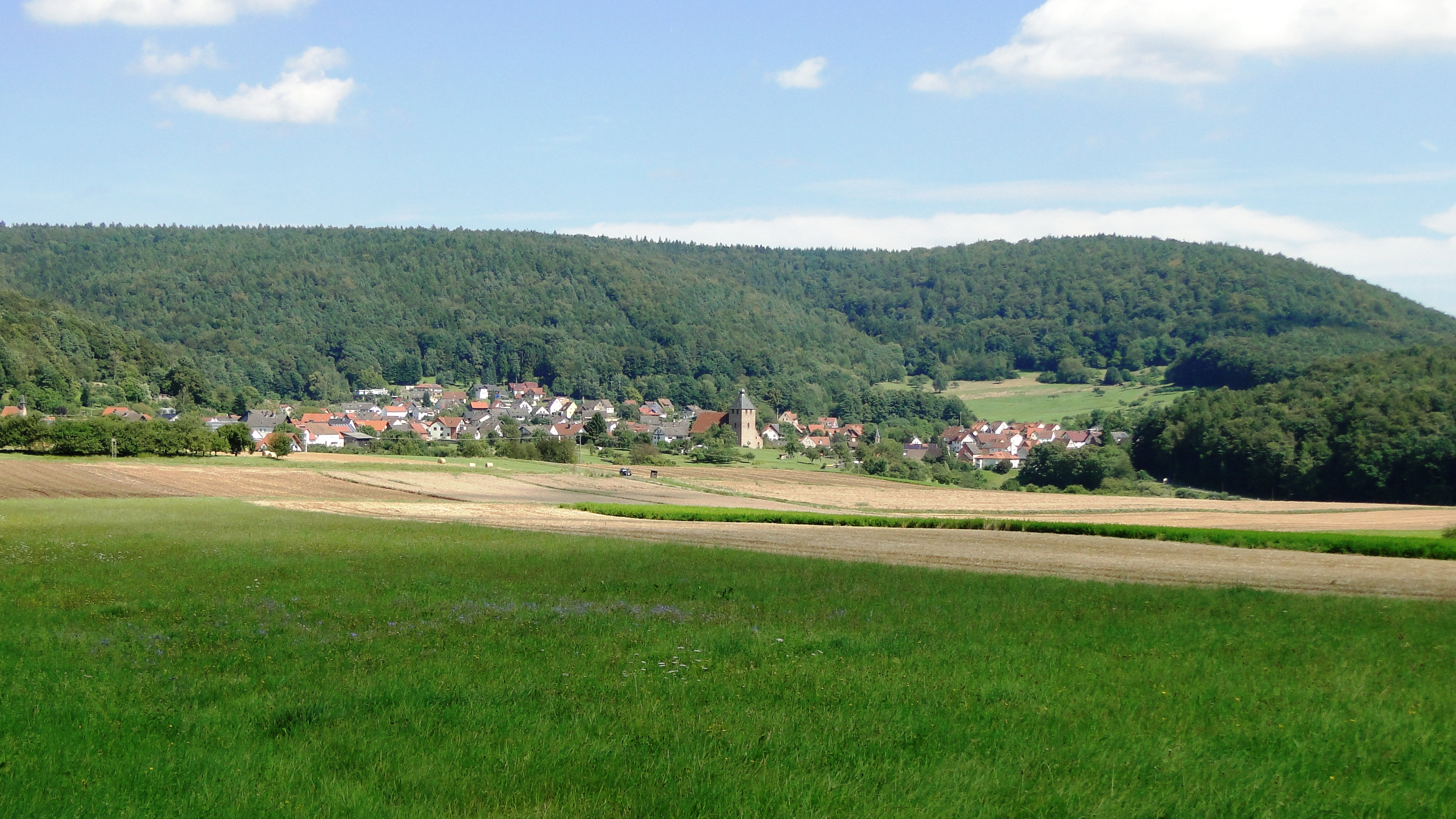
View of Eichenberg as seen from the west

Sailauf has two Ortsteile:

- Eichenberg (population 2013: 788)
- Sailauf (2,861)

In addition the hamlet Weiberhof is part of Sailauf. It consists of an industrial area near the Bundesautobahn 3 and the Schloss Weyberhöfe. Moreover, the municipal territory includes 19 small exclaves to the northeast (see map) surrounded by the Sailaufer Forst.

=== Neighbouring municipalities ===
Sailauf borders on (from the north, clockwise): Blankenbach, Sommerkahl, the unincorporated area Sailaufer Forst, Laufach, Bessenbach and Hösbach.

== History ==
Sailauf is among the Vorspessart's oldest settlements. As early as 1089, the original parish church in the upper Aschaff valley stood here.

In 1189, the lordly estate of Sigilovf(e), meaning "glistening brook", and out of whose name arose the placename Sailauf, had its first documentary mention. The first known inhabitant of Sailauf is Gerhardus de Sigeloufe, who is mentioned as a witness in court in 1229. The name "de Sigeloufe" means "of Sailauf" and is therefore also the oldest and perhaps first surname in Sailauf. In the 13th century, Sailauf was for a short time ruled by the Counts of Rieneck, who built the castle Landesere on the nearby Gräfenberg. In 1265, the Archbishop of Mainz, Werner von Eppstein built the hunting lodge castrum vivarium, which was later renamed Weyberhof. When the Plague raged in Europe in 1349, the Vorspessart was all but emptied of people. Newcomers later came to Sailauf from the Steigerwald. In 1552, Schloss Weyberhof was destroyed.

In the Thirty Years' War (1618–1648), Sailauf was almost completely destroyed. In 1789, Saint Vitus's Church (Sankt-Vitus-Kirche) was built above Sailauf, believed to be the fourth church built on this spot. In 1803, lordship of Mainz over the Vorspessart came to an end and in 1814, Aschaffenburg and its surrounding area passed to the Kingdom of Bavaria.

In 1972, the outlying municipality of Eichenberg was merged with Sailauf.

== Governance ==
=== Municipal council ===
The council is made up of 17 council members, counting the mayor.

	CSU	SPD	Freie Wählergemeinschaft Eichenberg	Total
2008	6	7	4	17 seats

(as at 6 March 2008)

=== Mayor ===
The mayor of Sailauf is Michael Dümig (SPD).

=== Coat of arms ===
The municipality's arms might be described thus: Argent a bend sinister gules surmounted by a wheel spoked of six of the first, in chief dexter a bend sinister wavy azure, in base sinister an oak sprig with a leaf in bend sinister and an acorn in bend vert.

The German blazon specifies a silver wheel (belegt mit einem sechsspeichigen silbernen Rad), although the example shown here has a golden wheel. This wheel – the Wheel of Mainz – and the bend sinister – the slanted stripe, so called because at the top it begins on the sinister (armsbearer's left, viewer's right) side – stand for the municipality's history, lasting from the 13th century until 1803, as an Electoral Mainz holding; the tinctures gules and argent (red and silver) were Mainz's colours. The blue wavy bend sinister stands for the municipality's location at the forks of the Sailauf and the Steinbach, two local brooks. The green oak twig with the acorn refers to the Spessart range, which is thickly wooded with oaks, and in which the municipality lies.

The arms were conferred on 21 March 1969.

== Culture and arts ==
Sailauf features the yearly Sailaufer Knoblauchfest ("Sailauf Garlic Festival") and the Tsukahara-Festival.

== Infrastructure ==
=== Transport ===
Sailauf has an interchange to the Bundesautobahn 3.

== Education ==
Among social institutions there are a kindergarten and a primary school. The municipality is a member of the association of municipal music schools.

== Notable people ==
- Felix Magath, footballer and trainer
- Bernhard Lippert, football trainer
- Theodor Bergmann, entrepreneur and carmaker
