= Erlenbach (Main) =

River in Germany

- The mouth of the Erlenbach into the Main

Location
- Country: Germany
- State: Bavaria

Physical characteristics
- Mouth
  - location: Main
  - coordinates: 49.8425°N 9.5981°E
- Length: 7.8 km (4.8 mi)

Basin features
- Progression: Main→ Rhine→ North Sea

Erlenbach (German: [ˈɛʁlənbax]) is a river of Bavaria, Germany. It is a left tributary of the Main in Marktheidenfeld.

== See also ==
- List of rivers of Bavaria
