= Heigenbrücken =

- Municipality
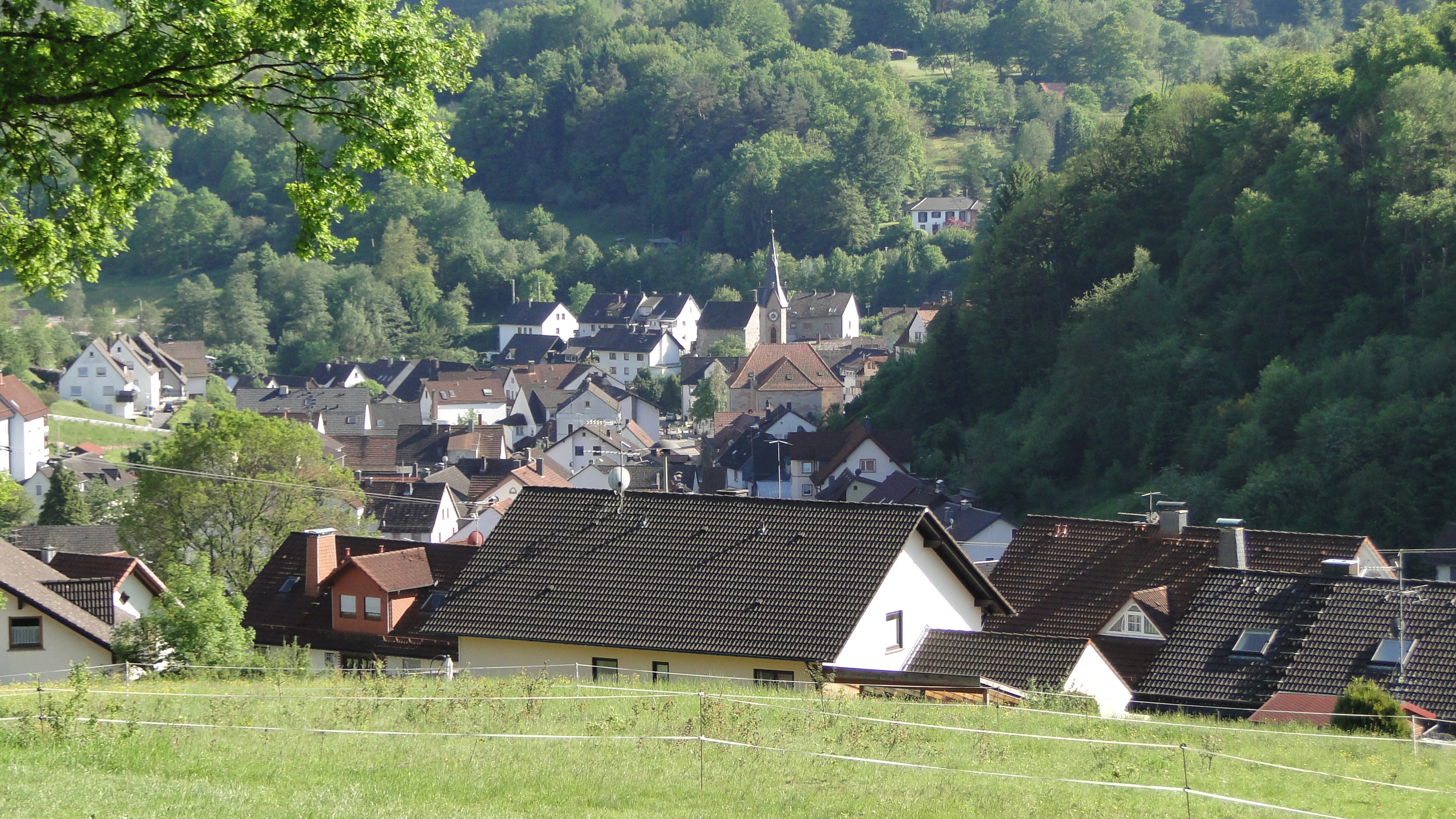
- Partial view of Heigenbrücken from the north, old village center with church

- Coat of arms

- Location of Heigenbrücken within Aschaffenburg district
- Interactive map of Heigenbrücken
- Location within Germany Location within Bavaria
- Coordinates: 50°2′N 9°23′E
- Country: Germany
- State: Bavaria
- Admin. region: Unterfranken
- District: Aschaffenburg
- Municipal assoc.: Heigenbrücken

Government
  - Mayor (2020–26): Jochen Drechsler

Area
  - Total: 6.70 km^{2} (2.59 sq mi)
- Elevation: 260–500 m (850–1,640 ft)

Population (2025-12-31)
  - Total: 2,224
  - Density: 332/km^{2} (860/sq mi)
- Time zone: UTC+01:00 (CET)
  - Summer (DST): UTC+02:00 (CEST)
- Postal codes: 63869
- Dialling codes: 06020
- Vehicle registration: AB
- Website: www.heigenbruecken.de

Heigenbrücken is a municipality in the Aschaffenburg district in the Regierungsbezirk of Lower Franconia (Unterfranken) in Bavaria, Germany, and seat of the Verwaltungsgemeinschaft (municipal association) of Heigenbrücken. It has a population of 2,207.

== Geography ==
=== Location ===
Heigenbrücken lies in the Bavarian Lower Main (Bayerischer Untermain) in the middle of the Spessart (range).

=== Constituent municipalities ===
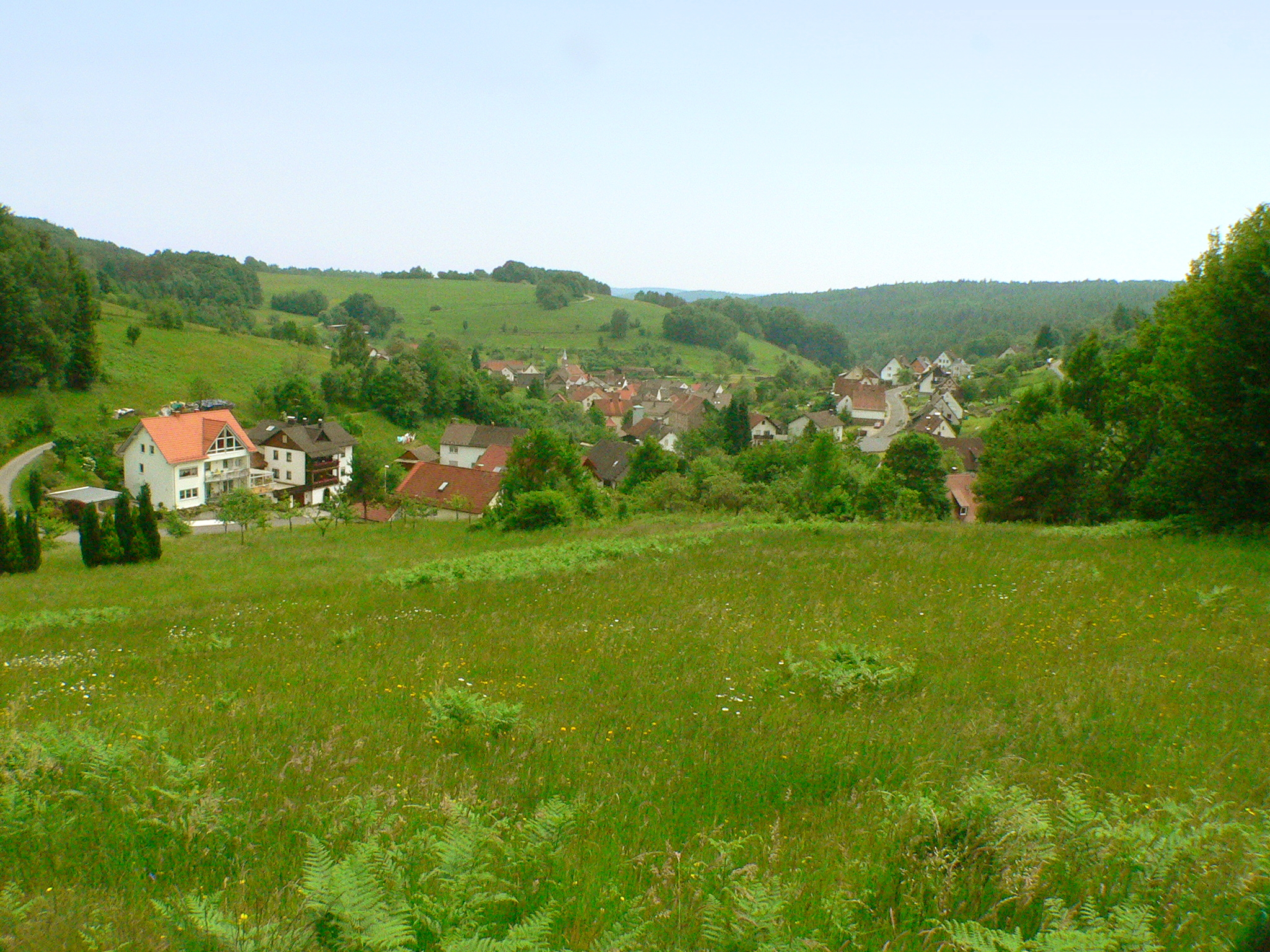
Jakobsthal

Heigenbrücken has one outlying Gemeindeteile, Jakobsthal, located about 5 km away from the main town.

== History ==
In 1477, Heigenbrücken had its first documentary mention as Heygerbruch. During Secularization/Mediatization, Heigenbrücken, along with the Archbishopric of Mainz, passed to the newly formed Principality of Aschaffenburg, with which it passed in 1814 (by this time it had become a department of the Grand Duchy of Frankfurt) to the Kingdom of Bavaria. In the course of administrative reform in Bavaria, the current municipality came into being with the Gemeindeedikt ("Municipal Edict") of 1818.

Heigenbrücken lies on an old road leading through the Spessart between Würzburg and Aschaffenburg.

== Demographics ==
The municipal area had 2,330 inhabitants in 1970, 2,332 in 1987 and 2,499 in 2000.

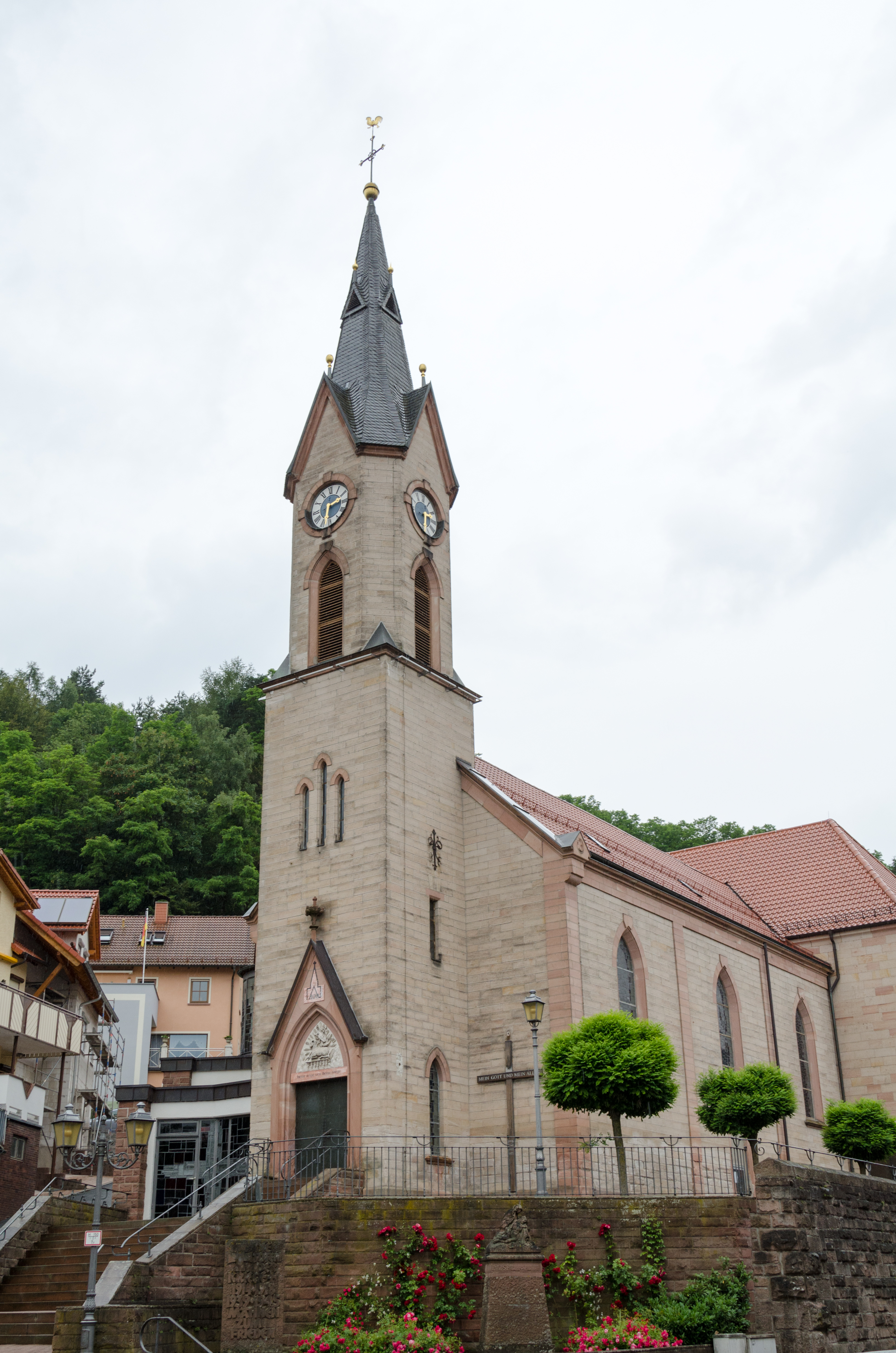
Catholic parish church St. Wendelin, Heigenbrücken

=== Religion ===
- Catholic: 1,961
- Evangelical: 255
- other: 376

(as at 1 January 2005)

== Economy ==
The municipal tax revenue in 1999 amounted to €935,000.

=== Agriculture and forestry ===
According to official statistics, there were 20 workers on the social welfare contribution rolls working in agriculture and forestry in 1998. In producing businesses this was 59, and in trade and transport 11. In other areas, 97 workers on the social welfare contribution rolls are employed, and 782 such workers work from home. There is one processing business. Three businesses are in construction, and furthermore, in 1999, there were no agricultural operations.

== Arts and culture ==
=== Museum ===
A privately run small motorcycle museum Moppedscheune shows motorcycles and accessories from the 1930s to the 1970s.

== Governance ==
=== Municipal council ===
The council is made up of 15 council members, counting the mayor.

	CSU	SPD	Freie Wähler Heigenbrücken-Jakobsthal	Total
2008	6	6	3	15 seats

(as at municipal election held on 2 March 2008)

=== Mayor ===
The mayor is Jochen Drechsler, elected in 2020.

=== Coat of arms ===
The municipality has borne arms since June 1977.

The municipality's arms might be described thus: Argent a gurgle glass gules palewise between two oak leaves vert palewise, in base a mound of the third surmounted by a tunnel portal masoned of the first with a tunnel sable.

The Schwarzkopftunnel, which at the building of the Ludwig-Westbahn (railway) was said to be a special technical achievement, and which is the municipality's landmark, was included as a charge in the arms. The two oak leaves refer to the municipality's geographical location in the Spessart, which has a wealth of oak trees. The “gurgle glass” (for want of a better translation – the German blazon calls for a Kutterolf, also known in German as an Angster or a Gluckerflasche) is a bottle or drinking vessel of a kind known since 3rd-century Cologne, and which was in use up until the 19th century; the charge stands for the once important glass industry in the municipality. Referring to the municipality's former allegiance to the Electorate of Mainz are the tinctures argent and gules (silver and red).

== Infrastructure ==
=== Transport ===
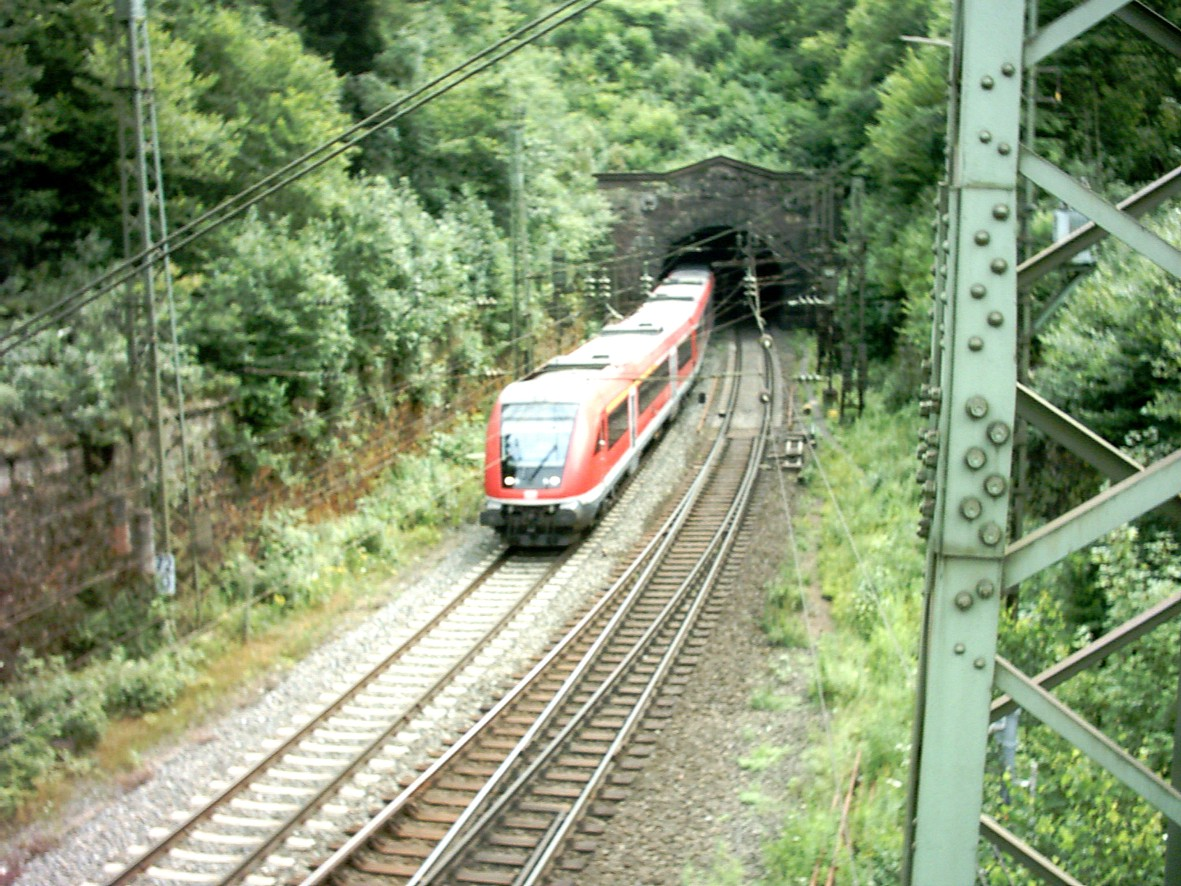
Portal of the old Schwarzkopftunnel in Heigenbrücken, now disused

Heigenbrücken lies on the Aschaffenburg-Würzburg long-distance railway line of the Main-Spessart railway.

The old Heigenbrücken railway station lies just east of the top-most tunnel, the Schwarzkopftunnel (built in 1854), which also appears in the municipality's arms. From a railway signalling point of view, the old 925 m-long Schwarzkopftunnel was part of Heigenbrücken railway station. This peculiarity stems from a pushing operation, undertaken until 2017, between Laufach and Heigenbrücken. Heavy goods trains came to a stop at Laufach station, where a helper locomotive joined the train's tail end to help the train's main locomotive get the train up the Spessart Ramp, which reached a steepness of 1:47 (some 21‰). The tunnel itself was built with no gradients to speak of. Just before the tunnel portal, the helper locomotive left the goods train, which by then had covered the steepest gradient and continued on its way southeastwards. So that the helper locomotive did not need to go through the tunnel and into the passenger transport complex (which would lead to disruption of normal operations), the tracks at the Aschaffenburg (that is to say, far) end of the tunnel were arranged in a way that allowed it to cross over to the other track and travel back to Laufach. The points needed for this also belonged to the Heigenbrücken signal box, meaning that the old Heigenbrücken station formally stretched right through the tunnel.

In June 2017, after four years of construction and at a cost of approximately €450 million, the track between Laufach and Heigenbrücken was moved and four new tunnels replaced the Schwarzkopftunnel. This realignment of the route necessitated the construction of a new stop for Heigenbrücken, replacing the old station to the west of the town center. The new stop, called Haltepunkt Heigenbrücken, is located to the east of the town center, consisting of a two-track island platform, adjacent to the eastern portals of the Falkenbergtunnel. It features a number of improvements, including higher platforms, LED lighting, a passageway under track one, a wheelchair/stroller accessible ramp and more. The first trains stopped/passed on 15 June 2017.

In addition to the Falkenbergtunnel (approximately 2600 m, making it the longest tunnel in the group), there is the Hirschbergtunnel (525 m, north tunnel, 375 m, south tunnel) Metzbergtunnel (629 m), Haintunnel (745 m). The new tunnels feature a number of new safety features including a powerful fire suppression system. Trains have been allowed to double their speed through the new tunnels from the previous speed limit of 70 km/h (43 mph) to 140 km/h (87 mph). Pushing operations for freight trains ceased when the new tunnels went into service.

All tracks and railway infrastructure leading to the closed Schwarzkopftunnel have been removed and the tunnel itself will be filled in. The tunnel exit with two carved lions is a protected monument and will be preserved. The newly reclaimed land of the old railway will be put to mixed residential/commercial use.

There is also limited bus service to and from Heigenbrücken.

St2317 connects Heigenbrücken to Bundesstrasse 26 (Aschaffenburg to Lohr).

== Education ==
The following institutions are to be found in Heigenbrücken (as at 1999):

- Kindergartens: 100 kindergarten places with 79 children.
- Elementary school: 1 with 17 teachers and 312 pupils.
