= Laufach =

- Municipality
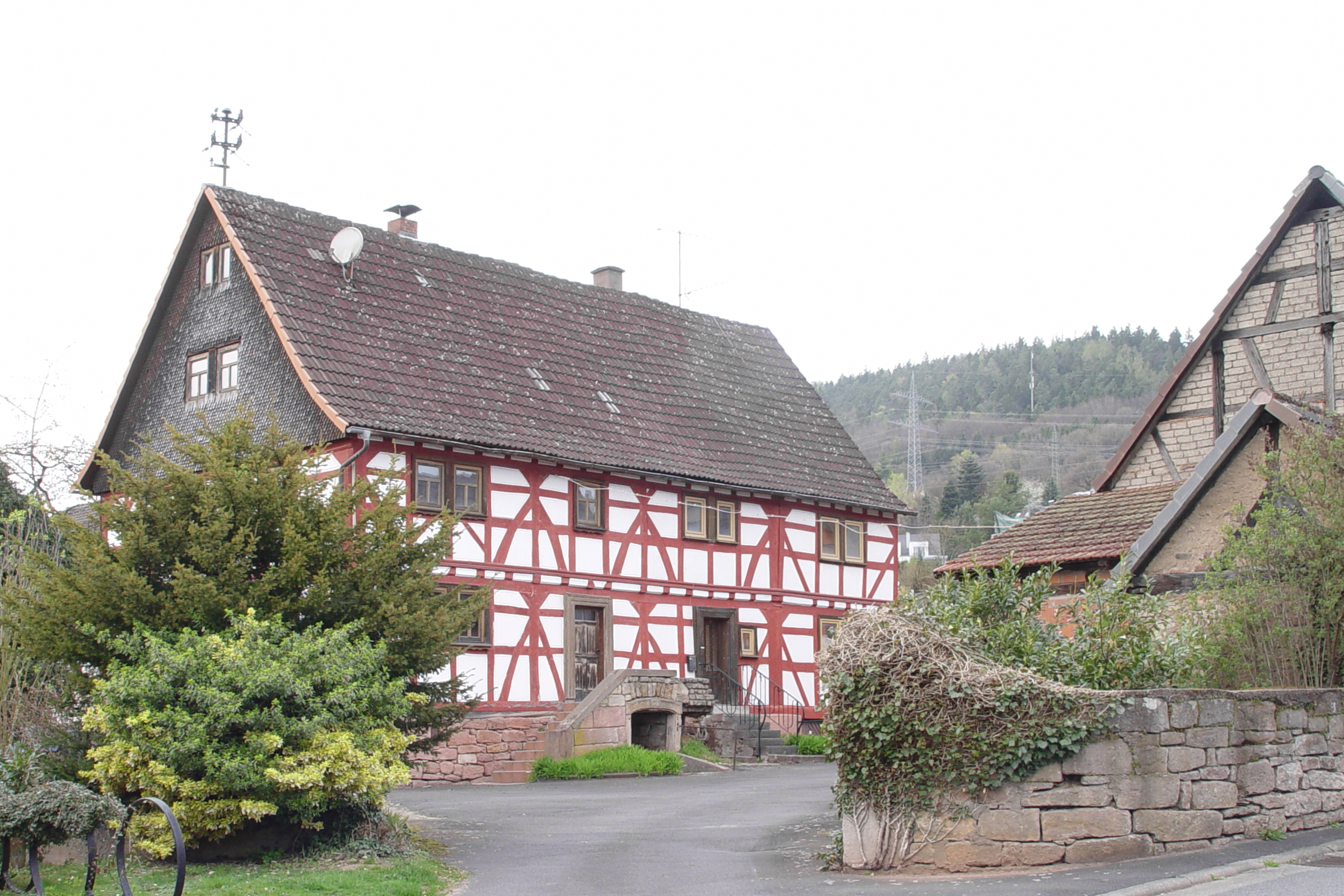
- Fachwerkhaus in Laufach

- Coat of arms

- Location of Laufach within Aschaffenburg district
- Interactive map of Laufach
- Location within Germany Location within Bavaria
- Coordinates: 50°01′N 09°18′E
- Country: Germany
- State: Bavaria
- Admin. region: Unterfranken
- District: Aschaffenburg
- Subdivisions: 3 Ortsteile

Government
  - Mayor (2020–26): Friedrich Fleckenstein (SPD)

Area
  - Total: 15.6 km^{2} (6.0 sq mi)
- Elevation: 180 m (590 ft)

Population (2025-12-31)
  - Total: 5,049
  - Density: 324/km^{2} (838/sq mi)
- Time zone: UTC+01:00 (CET)
  - Summer (DST): UTC+02:00 (CEST)
- Postal codes: 63846
- Dialling codes: 06093
- Vehicle registration: AB
- Website: www.laufach.de

Laufach (German pronunciation: [ˈlaʊfax]) is a municipality in the Aschaffenburg district in the Regierungsbezirk of Lower Franconia (Unterfranken) in Bavaria, Germany. As of 2023, the population of Laufach was 5,308.

== Geography ==
=== Location ===
Gemeindeteile

The municipality lies in northwest Bavaria east of Aschaffenburg. Laufach lies in the heart of the Vorspessart (range) and stretches through its outlying centre of Hain into the High Spessart. The municipality's elevation ranges from 170 to 500 m above sea level, including the peaks of Steigkoppe to the north and Steinknückl to the south.

=== Subdivisions ===
Laufach's Gemeindeteile are Frohnhofen (898 inhabitants), Hain (1,177 inhabitants) and Laufach (3,204 inhabitants).

== History ==
In 1084, Laufach, which was originally known as Laufahe, had its first documentary mention in an obituary from Saints Peter and Alexander collegiate church in Aschaffenburg. Laufach's name came from the stream on which it was built. Over the years, the municipality's name has changed many times, from Laufache in 1182, to Loifahe in 1191, to Loupha in 1348, to Lauffach around 1528 and 1624 before settling on Laufach in the early 19th century.

The Laufach valley was settled under the protection of the Counts of Rieneck, who already held the Vogtei (position of Vogt) from the Archbishopric of Mainz and the collegiate church in Aschaffenburg. On the Rieneck free court in 1380 – where Schöffen (roughly “lay jurists”) from Laufach were specifically mentioned – settlers sat as free citizens.

In the mid-14th century, glassmakers were brought into service in the Spessart with special incentives. Since they had to leave the forest from Martinmas (11 November) until Easter, they sought winter dwellings in Hain and Laufach. Many of these workers settled here owing to family ties. Already by 1469, there was a mine near the "Weyber" palace (Schloss Weyber, Weyberhöfe). In Unserer lieber Frauen Teil, presumably part of the Liebesgrund, copper was mined. After the Thirty Years' War, ores were mined and smelted.

In the mid-18th century, in the area of today's sporting ground, a hammer mill was built. The building of a railway in the years 1850 to 1854 had a very positive effect on the municipality's industrial development. With the railway station, an important transport link with Aschaffenburg and the whole Lower Main was created. In the course of time, the ironworks became an integrated industry in which both the mining and the processing were done, yielding a finished product.

Even trades and crafts were important to Laufach quite early on. From earlier craft businesses grew highly productive operations.

In 1866, shortly after the Austro-Prussian War broke out, the engagements near Frohnhofen between Prussia and troops of the German Confederation took place during the Campaign of the Main (Mainfeldzug).

In 1984, the municipality of Laufach celebrated 900 years of existence.

Frohnhofen and the outlying centre of Hain developed into purely residential areas in which most inhabitants earned their income in the industrial and commercial businesses in Laufach, Aschaffenburg and the surrounding area. Laufach's economy underwent a shift from agriculture to industry.

To further foster commercial-industrial growth, the Laufach-Ost commercial area was developed, covering an eight-hectare area between Laufach and Hain. Another such area was developed in 2001 on a four-hectare area between Laufach and Frohnhofen.

== Religion ==
There are a Catholic church and an Evangelical church in the core municipality. Until 1184 the people of the Laufach valley had to go to the Aschaffenburg Mother of God parish for church services, then from 1184 to 1250 to Bessenbach, and then from 1250 to 1810 to Sailauf.

On 28 November 1810, Laufach, together with Hain, was raised to a double parish. In 1812, a bigger church was built, which then stood on the Kirchberg until 1962. In 1964, on the same spot, a new church building was consecrated to Saint Thomas More.

In 1995, Saint Peter's Evangelical Church (Petruskirche) celebrated its 90th birthday.

== Demographics ==
Before the Thirty Years' War began in 1618, Laufach was a village with 76 Unterthanen (a word that usually means “subjects” in German, but in this case it means “men or families”) – all together 300 inhabitants. After the disastrous war, according to a description of properties from 1651, there were 12 men and 33 “hearth places” (houses). Through an energetic promotional effort by the Elector of Mainz, the depopulated Spessart was newly settled with soldiers, craftsmen and foreigners. The old family names had disappeared and new ones made their appearance. In 1668, Laufach had 72 households and 105 inhabitants.

Until Napoleonic times, Laufach belonged to Electoral Mainz. From 1803 to 1810 it belonged to the Principality of Aschaffenburg, then passing until 1813 to the Grand Duchy of Frankfurt. Since 1814, Laufach has been on Bavarian soil. At that time, Laufach and Frohnhofen counted all together 115 houses with 161 households and 1,451 inhabitants. The inflow of those driven from their homelands by the Second World War brought the population up to 2,552 in 1950. In 1967 there were more than 3,000 inhabitants in Laufach, among them 56 foreigners. With municipal reform in 1978 and the attendant amalgamation of the municipality of Hain im Spessart, the population rose to 4,545 all told, 2,995 from Laufach, 687 from Frohnhofen and 863 from Hain. In mid-2001, 5,267 persons were living in Laufach, among them 580 foreigners from 42 different nations.

== Government ==
=== Municipal council ===
The first mayor of the municipality of Laufach has been Friedrich Fleckenstein (independent) since May 1, 2014. In the local elections on March 15, 2020, he was re-elected with 91.49% of the vote. The predecessor was Valentin Weber (Free Voters).

Party
%

2020

Seats

2020

%

2008

Seats

2008

CSU
40.2
8
-
9
SPD
35.7
7
-
6
Free Voters
24.1
5
-
5

100.0
20
-
20

Results of the municipal elections 2020.

=== Coat of arms ===
The municipality's arms might be described thus: Gules a sprig of three oakleaves Or, in base a sledge and a cross-peen hammer in saltire argent.

The oakleaves shown in the arms refer to Laufach's location in the Spessart, which is rich in oaks. The crossed tools in the base are symbolic of the old iron mines and ironworks.

The arms were conferred on 19 September 1969.

The former municipality of Hain once bore its own arms.

== Infrastructure ==
=== Transport ===
Laufach can be reached via the Bundesstraße 26, by rail (Laufach station on the Aschaffenburg-Würzburg line, served by the Regionalbahn) and on the nearby A 3.

Laufach is located at one end of the Spessart Ramp of the Main-Spessart railway.

=== Public institutions ===
- South of the church, on the Laufachbach (stream), stands the town hall, built in 1956 and last renovated in 2002, next to the new Laufach fire station.
- The other fire stations in Frohnhofen and Hain were renovated in 1992 and 1995 with the fire brigade's involvement. The three formerly independent fire stations in the municipality's three centres, under a reorganization, joined together on 1 July 2004 under the new name Feuerwehr Gemeinde Laufach.
- In 1994 the newly established Kindergarten Hain as well as the building yard in the Laufach-Ost commercial area came into service.

== Education ==
- A combined school housing both a primary school and a Hauptschule serves youth from all three Gemeindeteile.
- After the municipality's oldest gymnasium was torn down, another one was built between Laufach and the outlying centre of Frohnhofen.
