= Laufach (river) =

River in Germany

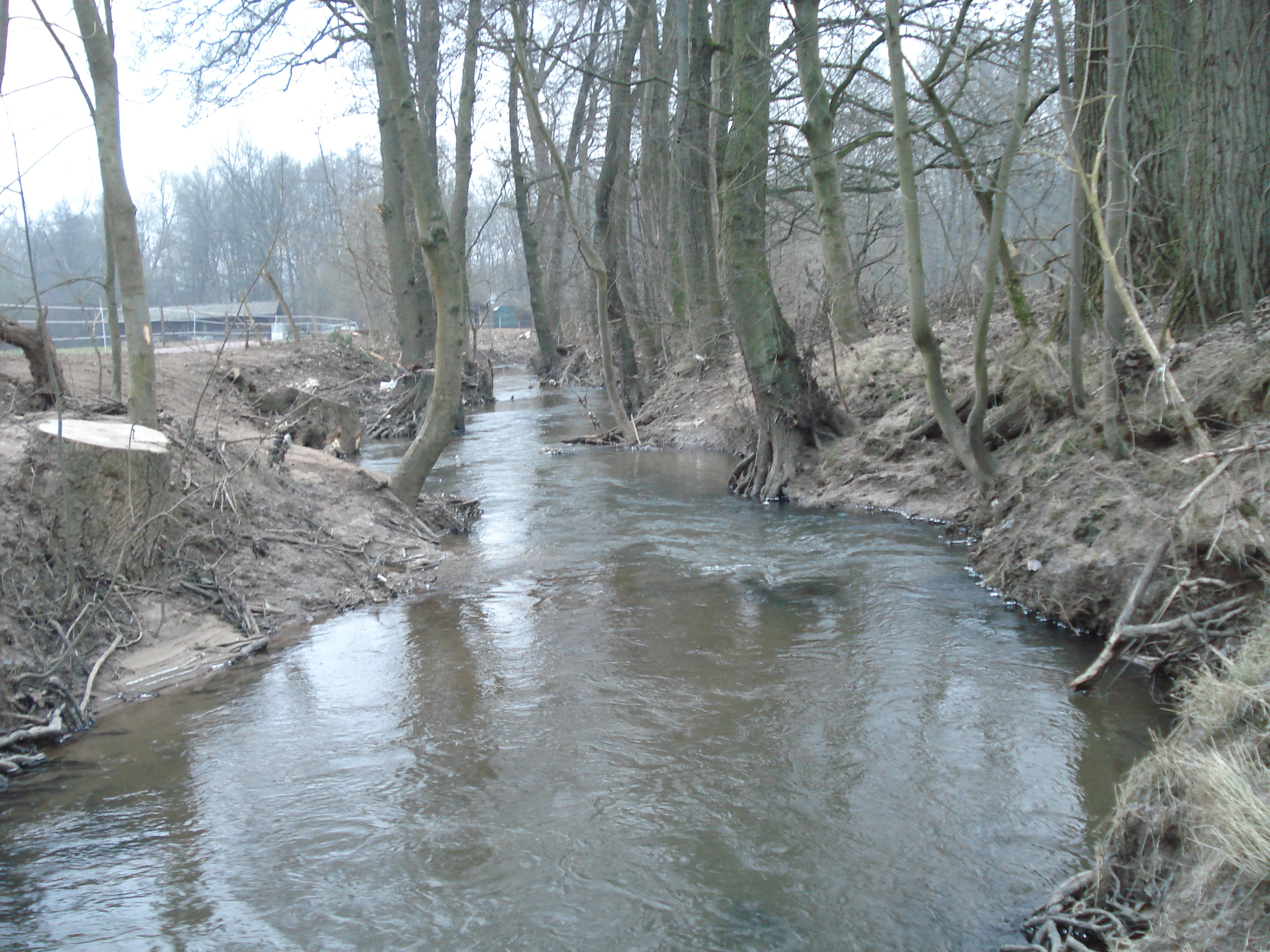
- The Laufach shortly before its mouth

Location
- Country: Germany
- State: Bavaria

Physical characteristics
- Mouth
  - location: Aschaff
  - coordinates: 50.0025°N 9.2312°E
- Length: 9.1 km (5.7 mi)

Basin features
- Progression: Aschaff→ Main→ Rhine→ North Sea

Laufach (German pronunciation: [ˈlaʊfax]; in its upper course: Schwarzbach) is a river of Bavaria, Germany. It flows into the Aschaff near Hösbach.

== See also ==
- List of rivers of Bavaria
