= Waigolshausen–Gemünden railway =

Railway line in Germany

Waigolshausen–Gemünden
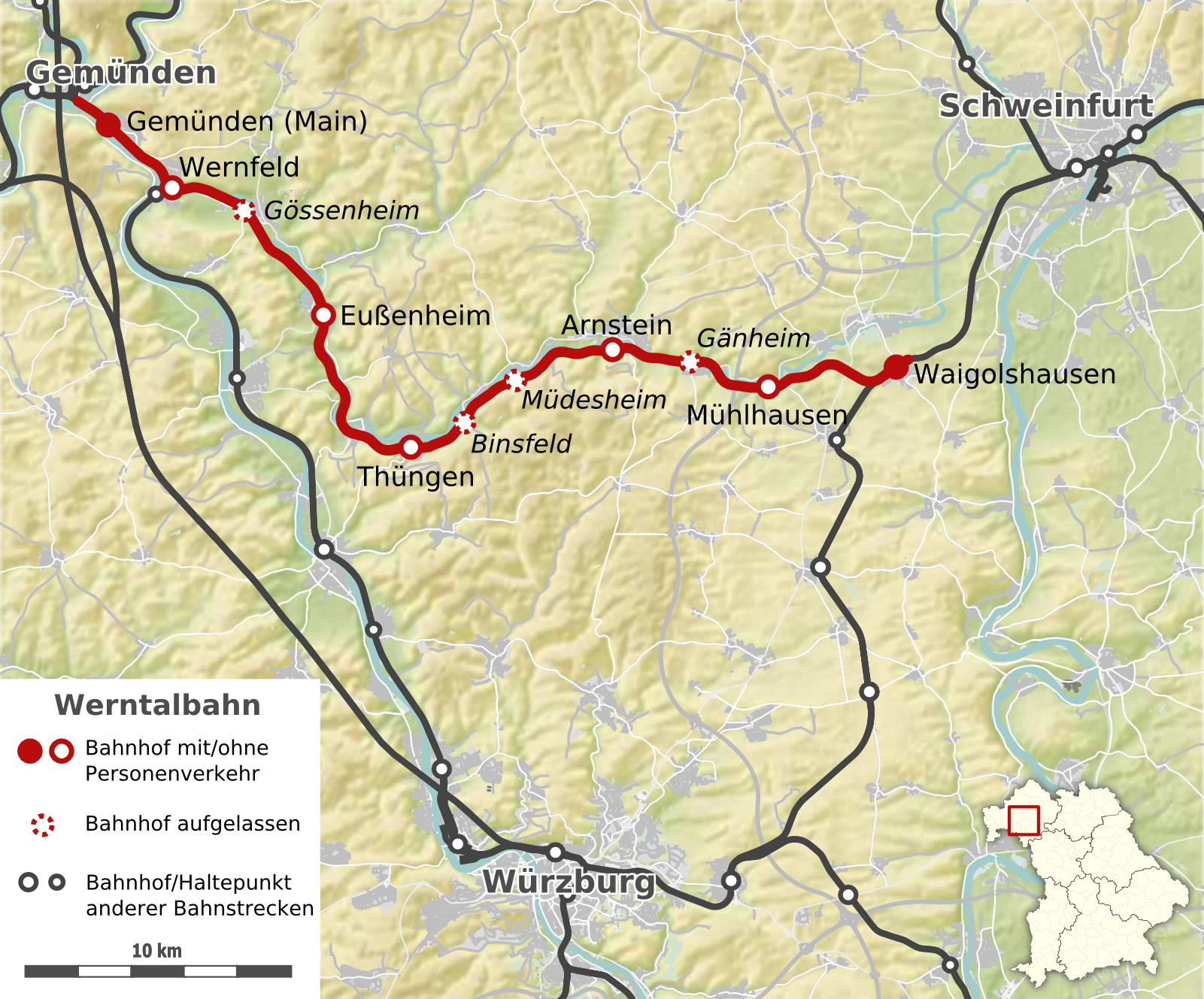

Overview
- Native name: Werntalbahn
- Line number: 5230
- Locale: Bavaria, Germany

Service
- Route number: ex 811 (1976)

Technical
- Line length: 39.7 km (24.7 mi)
- Track gauge: 1,435 mm (4 ft 8 1/2 in) standard gauge
- Electrification: 15 kV/16.7 Hz AC overhead catenary
- Operating speed: 100 km/h (62.1 mph) (max)

The Waigolshausen–Gemünden railway (also known in German as the Werntalbahn—"Wern Valley Railway") is a single-track electrified main line railway in Lower Franconia in the German state of Bavaria. It runs in the Wern valley from Waigolshausen via Arnstein to Gemünden am Main and it is currently mainly used for freight traffic.

== History ==
On 1 July 1854, the Schweinfurt–Würzburg line was opened as a section of the Ludwig Western Railway and it was extended to Aschaffenburg in the same year. Despite the devious route that was involved in going via Würzburg, the direct route via the Wern valley was not opened until 15 May 1879. The line had its importance, especially for regional freight and passenger traffic. Passenger traffic, however, declined more and more in the second half of the 20th century until passenger services ended completely on 30 May 1976. Freight traffic has never lost its importance on the Wern Valley Railway, which is still busy as a bypass of the Würzburg node. For this reason it was electrified in 1971 along with the Bamberg–Waigolshausen railway (the Waigolshausen–Rottendorf line was converted to electric operations in the summer 1972 timetable) and it was extensively renovated and modernised from 2002. Meanwhile, there are also efforts to restore passenger services, so, for example, a train for cyclists runs from Aschaffenburg to Bamberg in the summer on weekends on the Wern Valley Railway, but without stopping on it. In addition, Erfurter Bahn uses the line for the movement of empty rolling stock.

== Operations ==
As of the 2016 timetable there have been Regional-Express services running between Frankfurt and Bamberg on weekends, running four times a day over the Wern Valley Railway with a total journey time of about 2.5 hours. These are operated by Bombardier TWINDEXX sets, a new train class. These do not stop on this line.

== Route ==
South of Waigolshausen station, the Wern Valley Railway separates from the main line from Schweinfurt to Würzburg and runs down the Wern valley. It first runs on the left (south) and then on the right (north) bank of the Wern to Arnstein, where it bends to the southwest. The line continues to Stetten on the southern bank, where it describes an arc to the northwest. Until shortly after Stetten it runs mostly parallel with federal highway B 26, which then runs towards Karlstadt, while the Wern Valley Railway continues down the Wern valley. From Eußenheim the line must cross the Wern several times before it meets with the Main–Spessart railway from Würzburg at Wernfeld, which it does not merge with, but instead runs parallel with it until Gemünden.
