= Aschbach (Wern) =

River in Germany

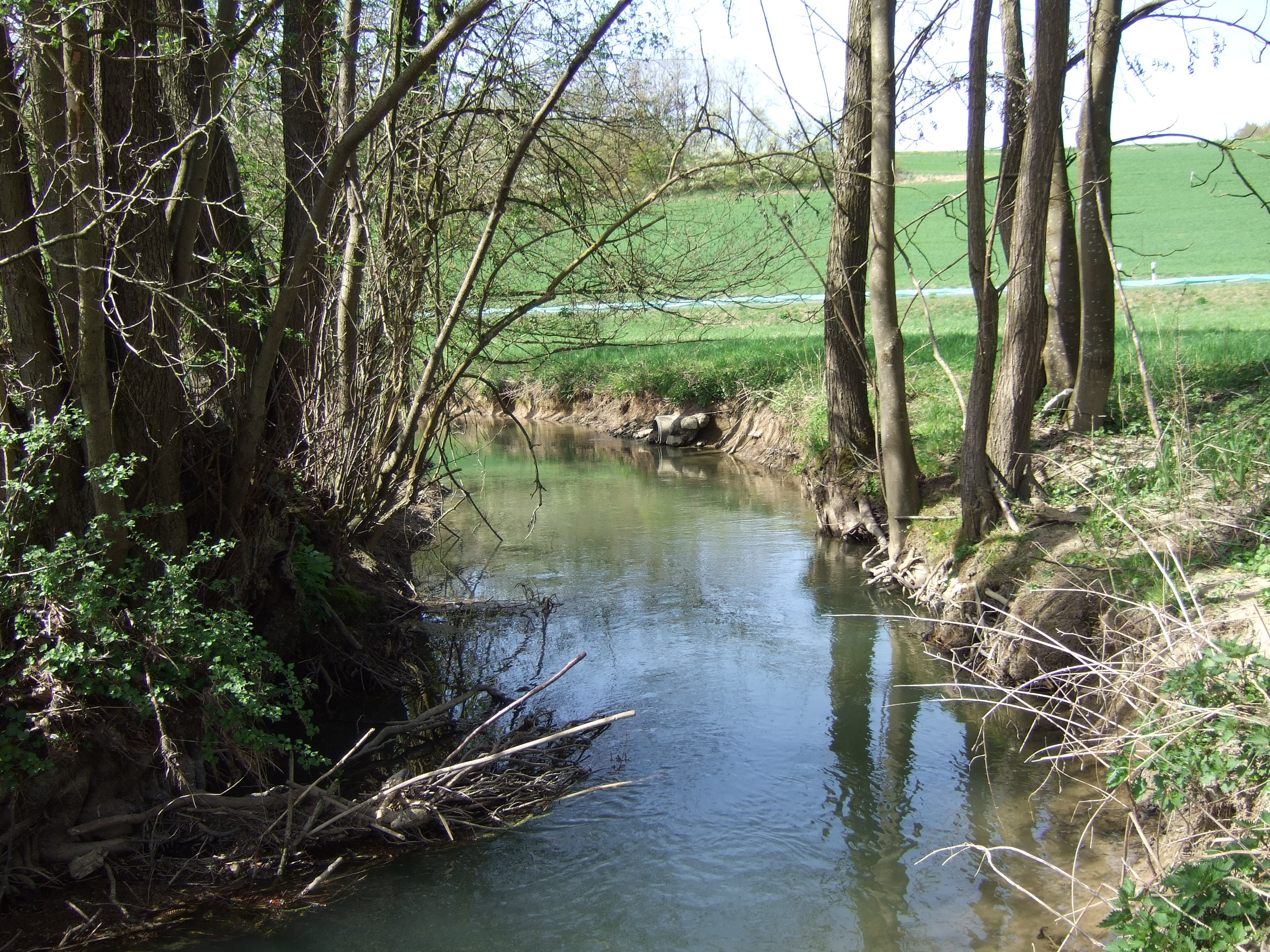
- The Aschbach near the Kühles Loch, a karst spring that flows into the Aschbach

- Location of mouth in Bavaria

Location
- Country: Germany
- State: Bavaria

Physical characteristics
- Mouth
  - location: Wern
  - coordinates: 49.9982°N 9.8103°E
- Length: 16.5 km (10.3 mi)

Basin features
- Progression: Wern→ Main→ Rhine→ North Sea

Aschbach is a river in Lower Franconia, Bavaria, Germany.

The source of the Aschbach is in the district of Bad Kissingen, south of the military training ground Hammelburg, near the Bildeiche. It starts southwards, along the street 2294 to Gauaschach, a district of Hammelburg. There it flows into the Main-Spessart district and changes its flow direction to the southwest. Via Obersfeld, Hundsbach, Bühler and Münster, it reaches Aschfeld (all are Gemarkungen of Eußenheim). Here it crosses the street Bundesstraße 27 and flows from the right into the Wern.

== See also ==
- List of rivers of Bavaria
