= Ludwig Western Railway =

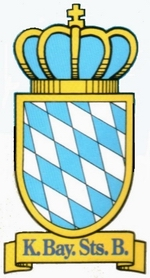
Logo of state railway of Kingdom of Bavaria

The Ludwig Western Railway (Ludwigs-West-Bahn) is a German railway line that was originally funded by the Kingdom of Bavaria. It runs from Bamberg via Würzburg to Aschaffenburg and on into the former "Kurhessian" Hanau.

== History ==
In the 1840s it was already clear that improvements to the navigation of inland waterways provided by the building of the canal between the rivers Main and Danube, fostered by King Ludwig I of Bavaria, had not triumphed over the railways. After the king had given up his opposition to a main railway line, parliament passed the law for the construction of Ludwig's Western Railway on 23 March 1846, the second main line to be built by the Royal Bavarian State Railways (Königlich Bayerische Staats-Eisenbahnen).

Operations were first begun on the Hanau–Aschaffenburg section by the Frankfurt-Hanau Railway (Frankfurt-Hanauer Eisenbahn) and transferred to the Hessian Ludwigsbahn from 1863. The latter also acquired ownership of the section now running through Prussia in 1872. In 1893 the Hessian Ludwigsbahn – and its ownership and running powers – were transferred to the Prussian state railways.

== Construction and Operation of the Route ==
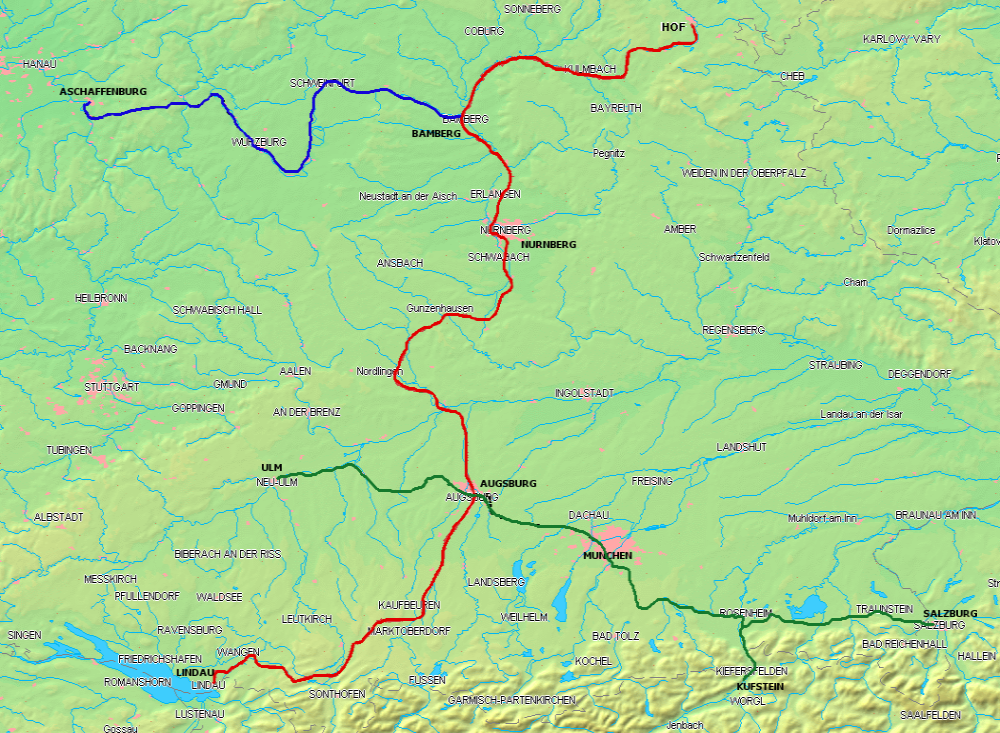
The three Bavarian main lines with Ludwig's Western Railway in blue

After delays due to the years of revolution around 1848, the route was able to be opened in sections from 1852.

- 1 August 1852 Bamberg–Haßfurt (32.5 km)
- 3 November 1852 Haßfurt–Schweinfurt (24.3 km)
- 1 July 1854 Schweinfurt–Würzburg (43.3 km)
- 1 October 1854 Würzburg–Aschaffenburg–state border at Kahl (105.7 km)

The route runs from Bamberg, the junction with the Ludwig South-North Railway, to Schweinfurt, from Würzburg to Lohr and from Aschaffenburg to Kahl in the Main valley. From Schweinfurt to Würzburg it runs away from the loop in the Main, taking a short cut across the triangle of land formed by the Main over gently rolling hill country. Würzburg Hauptbahnhof (main station) was the terminus inside the fortified city until 1869. From Lohr to Aschaffenburg the railway line again takes a short cut away from the Main and crosses the Spessart highlands in a relatively straight line through a tunnel, following the course of the Laufach and Aschaff valleys. At the state border in Kahl it connects to a line opened by the Frankfurt-Hanau Railway on 22 June 1854, who operated the section from the border to Aschaffenburg as a leased railway. In this way Bavaria had linked the two important commercial cities of Leipzig and Frankfurt am Main with railway routes.

== Structures ==
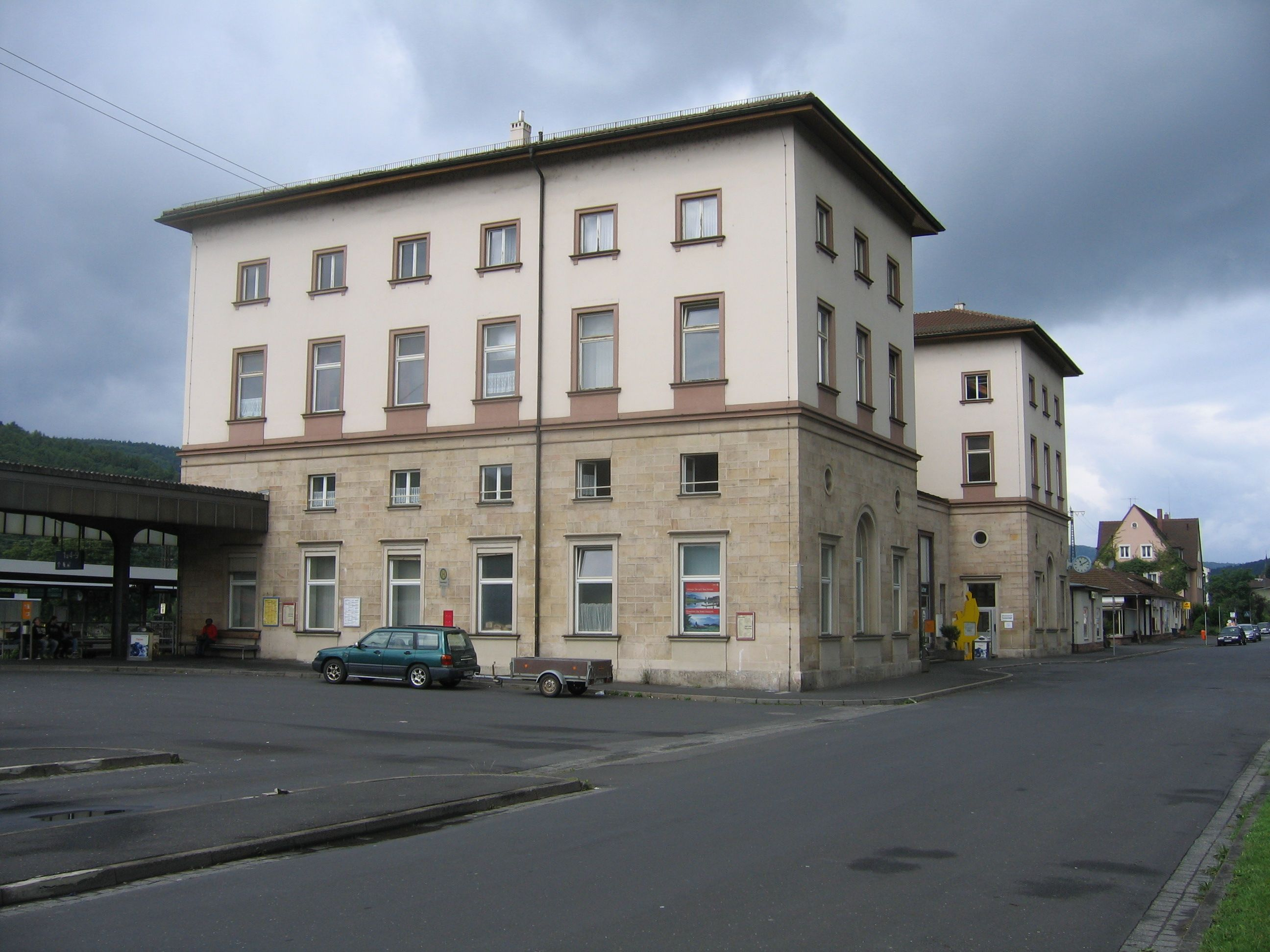
Gemünden Station from the street side

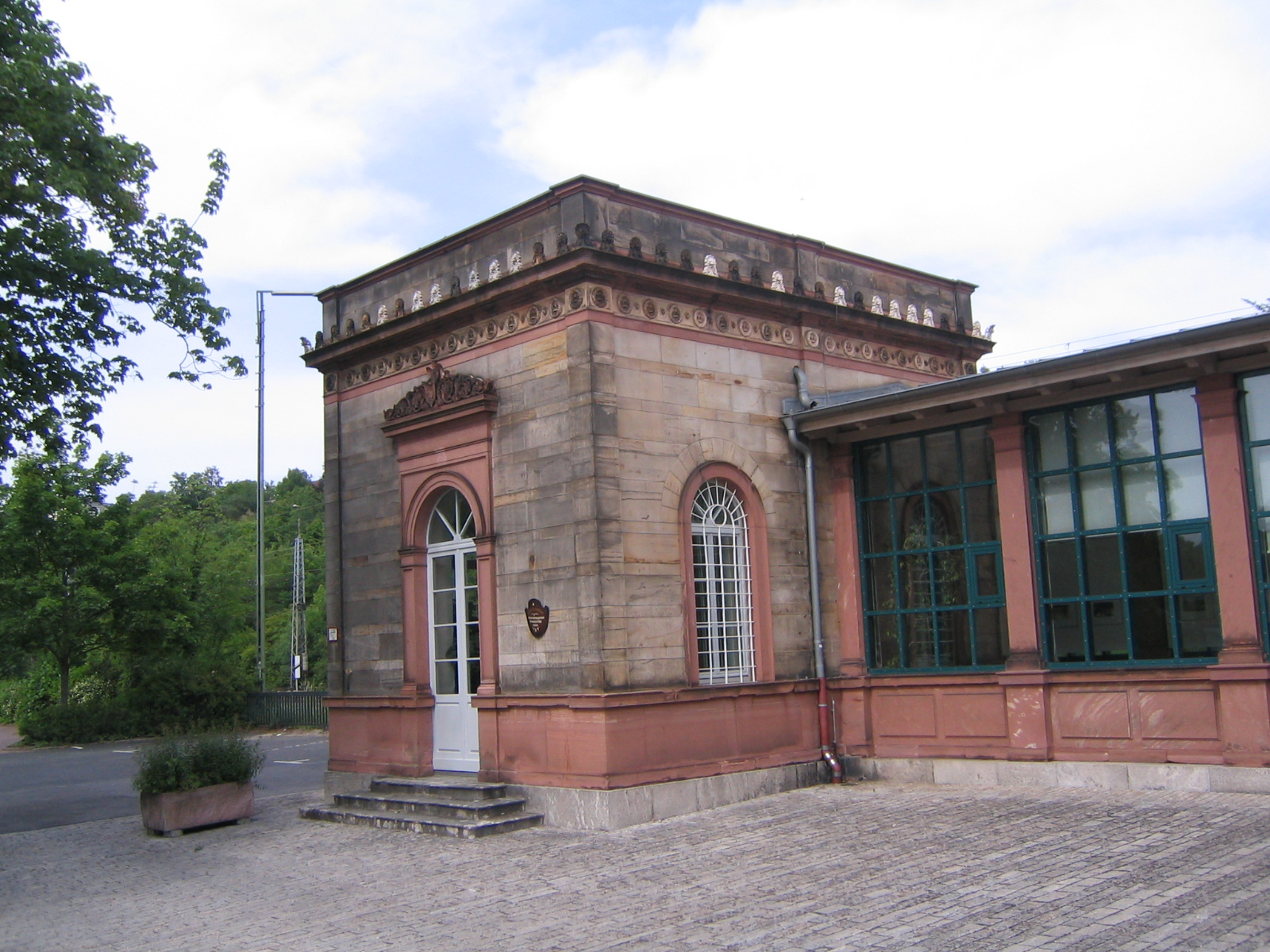
Royal wing of Veitshöchheim station, on the right a section of the covered walkway to the station building

The most important structures on the line include a tunnel in Schweinfurt, the bridge over the confluence of the Franconian Saale and Franconian Sinn with the river Main at Gemünden, the Schwarzkopf tunnel and the two railway embankments at Hain im Spessart, which are part of the famous Spessart ramp.

Also noteworthy is the station building at Veitshöchheim which has been preserved in its original state, and has a particularly representative layout including a royal pavilion in the same style as Schloss Veitshöchheim.

== Expansion ==
The route was planned and laid for two tracks, but only entered service as a single-track line as far as the incline on the Spessart ramp from Heigenbrücken to Laufach. The next twin-track section was the stretch from Rottendorf to Würzburg after the line from Fürth to Rottendorf was opened in 1865. The second track was laid on the remaining sections by the 1890s. The line was electrified on the following sections: Rottendorf–Würzburg in 1954, Würzburg–Aschaffenburg in 1957, Aschaffenburg–Frankfurt/Darmstadt in 1960 and Bamberg–Schweinfurt–Rottendorf in 1971.

== Significance Today ==
The section from Würzburg to Aschaffenburg runs today under the name of the Main-Spessart Railway and continues to be one of the most important stretches of railway line in Germany.

The Rottendorf-Bamberg section, (today KBS 810, Würzburg–Bamberg, in the timetable) lost its importance for passenger traffic between Würzburg and Nuremberg when the direct line from Rottendorf via Kitzingen to Fürth was opened. The section Bamberg–Schweinfurt–Waigolshausen (with a junction to the Werntal Railway to Gemünden) is important for goods traffic.

The Schweinfurt–Würzburg section, which had become part of the Berlin-Stuttgart(-Rome) link via Erfurt with the opening of the Brandleite tunnel in 1884, lost its importance for long-distance services after the division of Germany in 1945.

== Sources ==
- Deutsche Reichsbahn, Die deutschen Eisenbahnen in ihrer Entwicklung 1835–1935, Berlin, 1935.
- Wolfgang Klee/Ludwig v. Welser, Bayern-Report, Bände 1–5, Fürstenfeldbruck, 1993–1995.
- Eckhart Rüsch, Der Bahnhof Veitshöchheim, in: Jahrbuch für Eisenbahngeschichte24 (1992), S. 23ff.
- Bernhard Ücker, 150 Jahre Eisenbahn in Bayern, Fürstenfeldbruck 1985

== See also ==
- Main-Spessart Railway
