= Würzburg–Aschaffenburg railway =

Railway line in Germany

Würzburg–Aschaffenburg
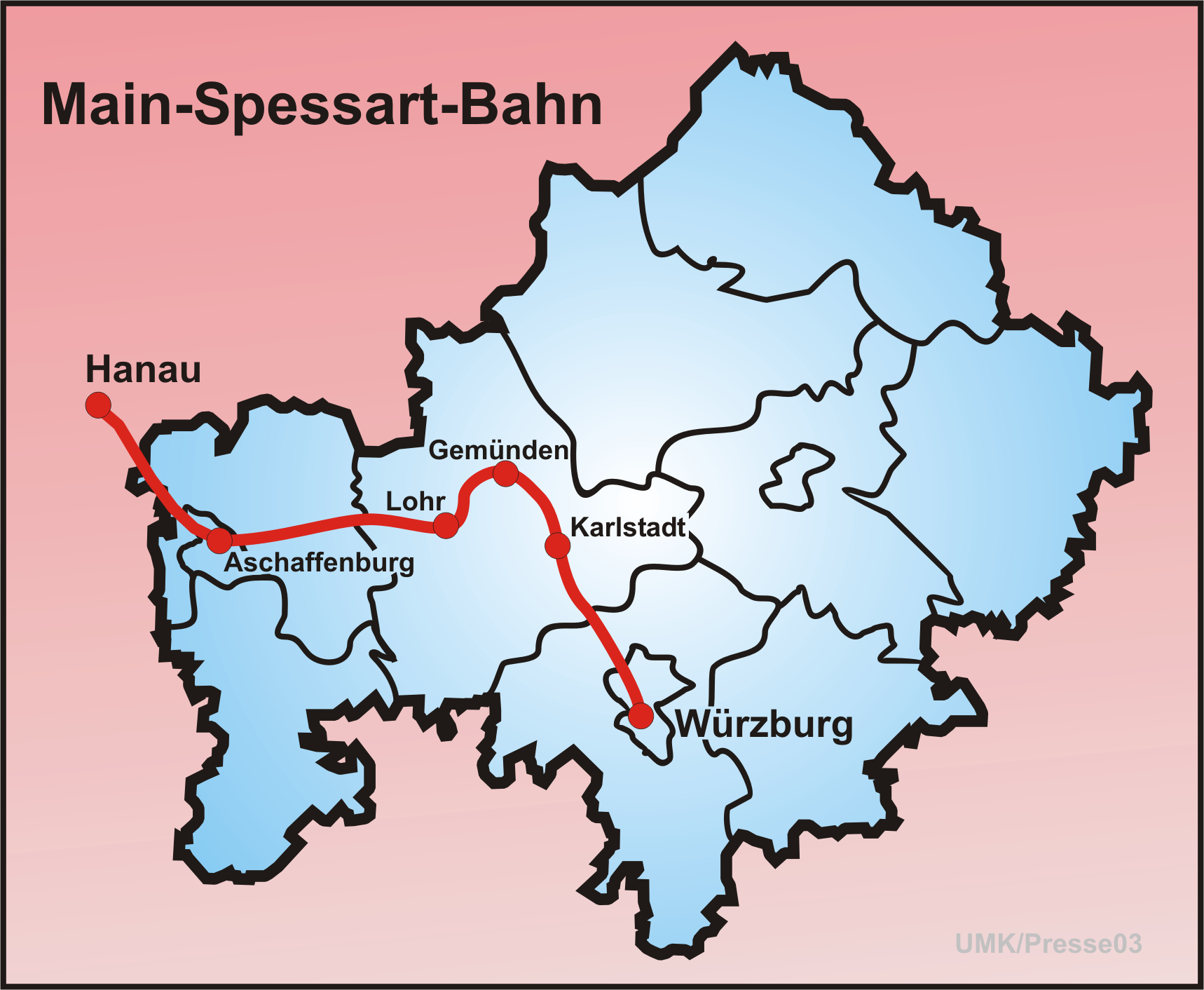

Overview
- Native name: Main-Spessart-Bahn
- Status: Operational
- Owner: Deutsche Bahn
- Line number: 5200 (Würzburg–Aschaffenburg); 3660 (Aschaffenburg–Hanau)
- Locale: Bavaria and Hesse, Germany
- Termini: Würzburg Hbf.; Hanau Hbf.
- Stations: 25

Service
- Type: Heavy rail, Passenger/freight rail Regional rail, Intercity rail
- Route number: 800 (Würzburg–Aschaffenburg); 640 (Aschaffenburg–Hanau)
- Operator(s): DB Bahn
- Rolling stock: ICE 2, ICE 3 DB Class 101; DB Class 111, DB Class 440

History
- Opened: 1 October 1854

Technical
- Line length: 89.3 km (55.5 mi)
- Number of tracks: Double track
- Track gauge: 1,435 mm (4 ft 8 1/2 in) standard gauge
- Electrification: 15 kV/16.7 Hz AC overhead catenary

The Würzburg–Aschaffenburg railway (also known in German as the Main-Spessart-Bahn) is an 89 kilometre-long railway line in the Bavarian province of Lower Franconia. It runs from Würzburg via Gemünden (Main) to Aschaffenburg. It is particularly important for long-distance and goods traffic because it links the Rhine-Main conurbation immediately northwest of Aschaffenburg with the Lower Franconian city of Würzburg and beyond it to the metropoles of Nuremberg and Munich. The German name derives from the fact that it initially runs parallel to the River Main and then cuts through the Spessart hills. It was opened on 22 June 1854 by the Frankfurt-Hanau Railway Company and is one of the oldest railways in Germany.

== History ==
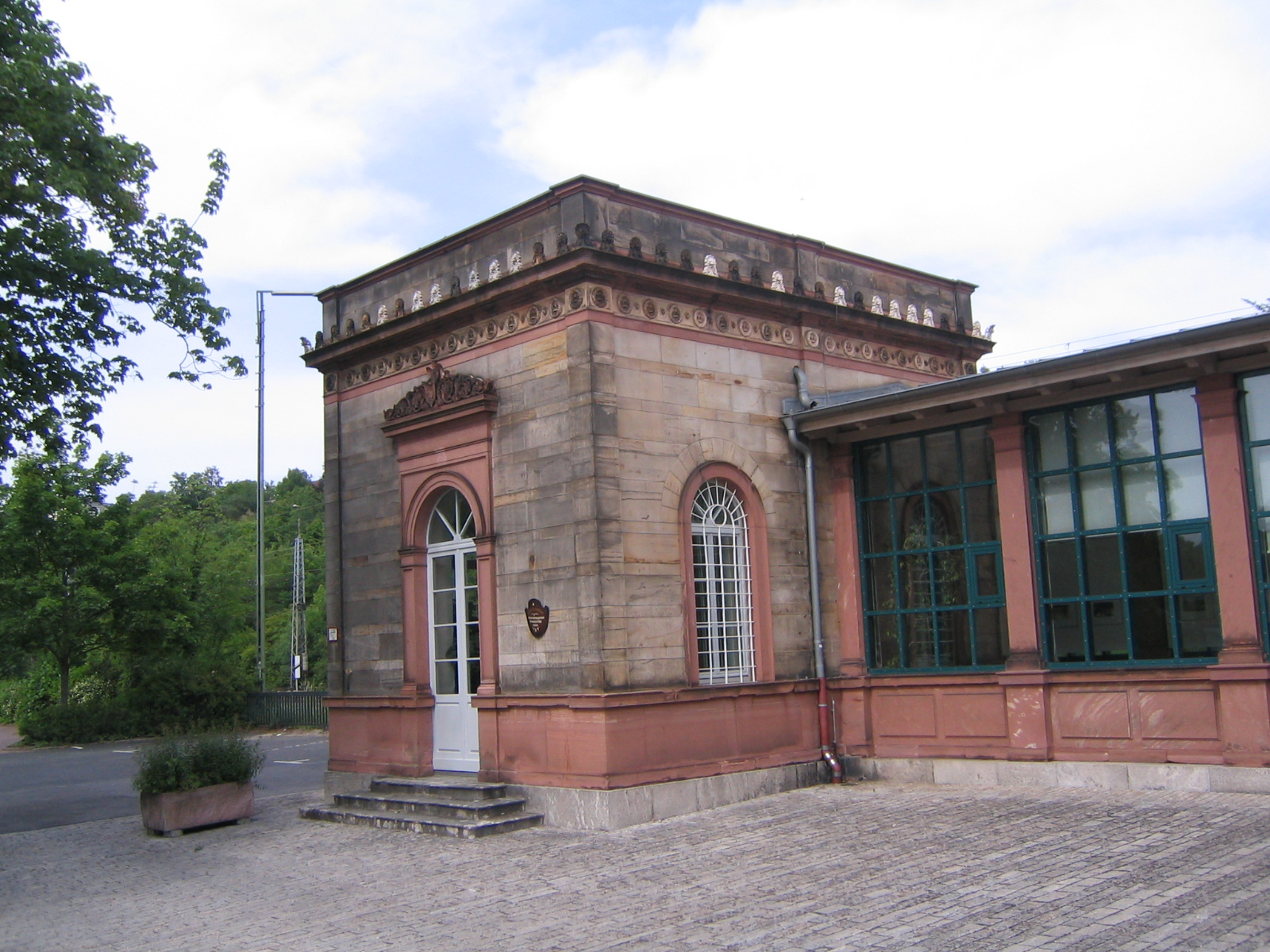
Royal pavilion of the Veitshöchheim station, on the right part of the walkway to the entrance building

=== The Bavarian section ===
Development of the line was licensed under the Bavarian law of 23 May 1846. The Royal Bavarian State Railways (Königlich Bayerische Staats-Eisenbahnen) opened the section of the Main–Spessart railway from Würzburg to the then national border with the Electorate of Hesse, which lay between Kahl am Main and Großkrotzenburg, via Aschaffenburg on 1 October 1854. It formed part of the Bavarian Ludwig Western Railway, which ran from Bamberg via Schweinfurt.

The 96-metre-long railway bridge over the A 3 was rebuilt near Hösbach between February 2010 and October 2011.

Until June 2017, the most operationally demanding section of the line was the 5.4 kilometre-long Spessart Ramp, a steep section between Laufach and the Schwarzkopf Tunnel with an average gradient of 1.9%, which meant that heavy freight trains required assistance from a bank engine. Since June 2017, the Spessart ramp has been replaced by a new line on a significantly flatter route.

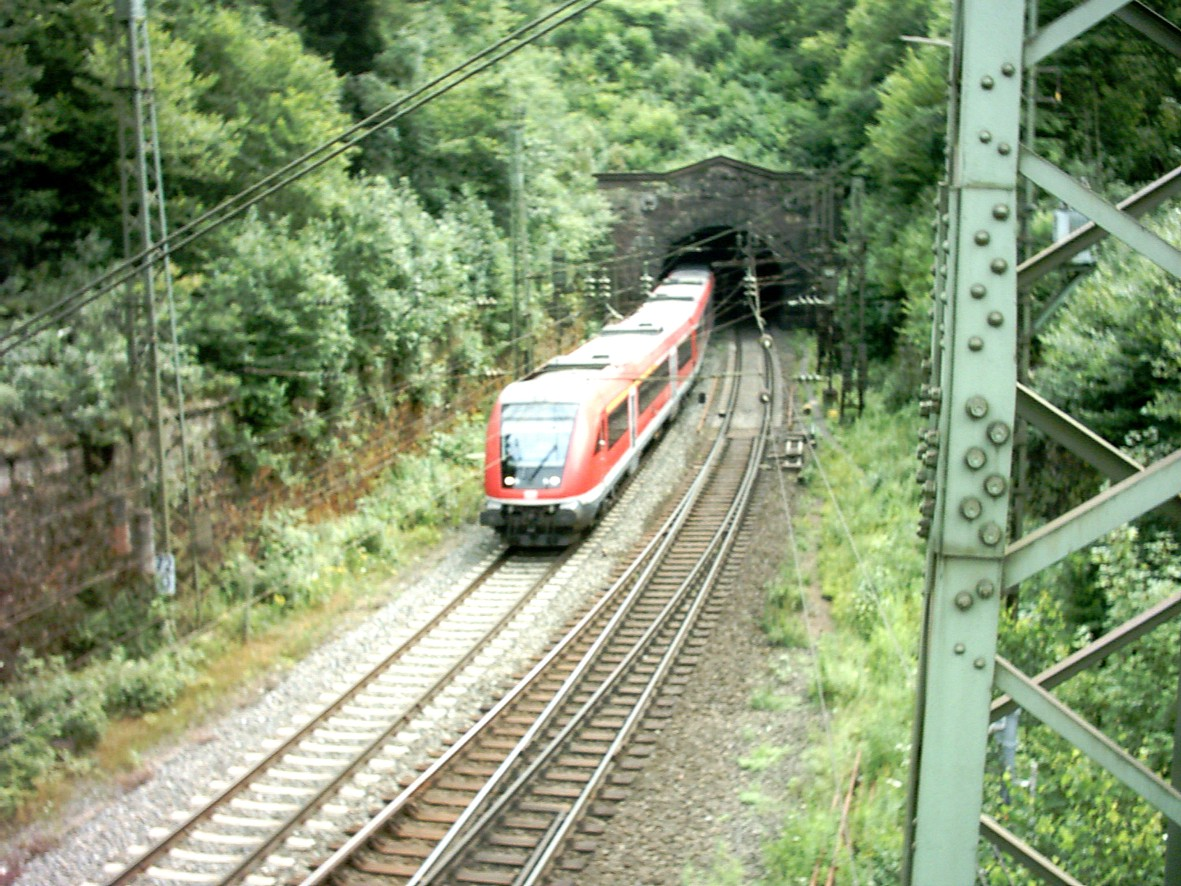
Eastern portal of the former Schwarzkopf Tunnel near Heigenbrücken

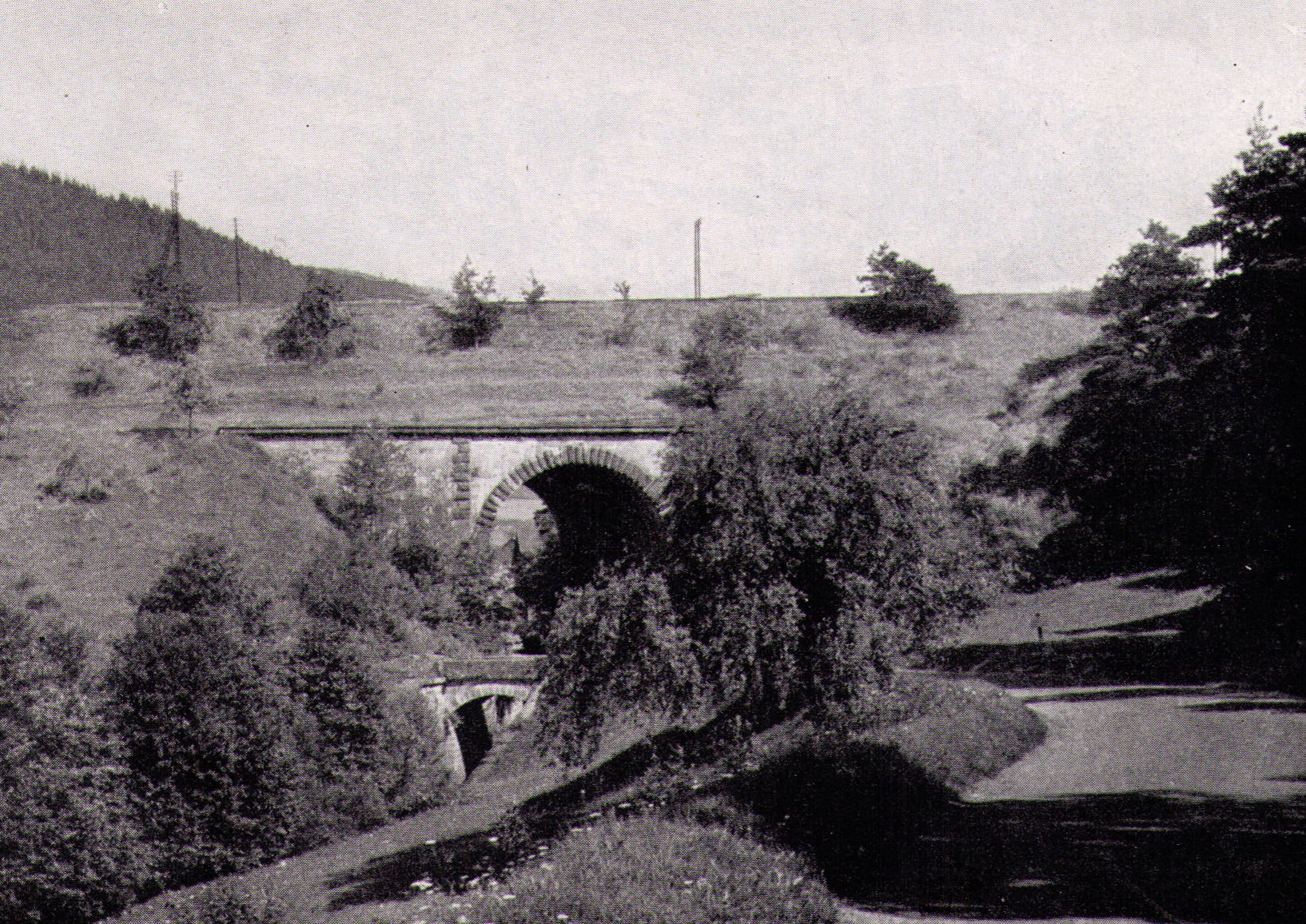
Road underpass at Laufach-Hain (now: B 26), opened in 1852

=== The Electorate of Hesse section ===
The section in the Electorate of Hesse from the former state border to the former Hanau station, where it connected to the Frankfurt–Hanau railway was built and operated on the basis of a license from the Electorate and a treaty between the Kingdom of Bavaria and the Electorate signed on 7 June 1850. The financing of the construction of the line by the Hanau bank, Bernus du Fay, caused a government crisis in the Electorate in 1852, because the elector, Frederick William I expected a bribe of 100,000 Thalers before he signed the concession. The leading minister in the Electorate, Ludwig Hassenpflug, then offered his resignation, but the elector refused it. The Hanau–Aschaffenburg section was originally operated by the Frankfurt-Hanau Railway Company (Frankfurt-Hanauer Eisenbahn-Gesellschaft) and the Bavarian part was leased to them. The Hessian Ludwig Railway (Hessische Ludwigsbahn) took over the operations of the Frankfurt-Hanau Railway in 1863 and acquired it in 1872 as it now lay in Prussia, as a result of the Austro-Prussian War.

=== 20th century ===
During the Second World War, the Main-Spessart Railway was the target of Allied air raids as an important route for traffic. One raid took place on the night of 1/2 April 1942.

The section from Würzburg to Veitshöchheim has been electrified since 10 October 1954 and the whole line has been operated electrically since 26 September 1957. Since then, the number of freight trains requiring a bank engine has declined sharply. Until the opening of the new Spessart Ramp, such a locomotive was still based in Laufach station. With 365 trains per day, the line was heavily congested in the summer of 1970 according to Deutsche Bundesbahn.

=== New plans ===
In conjunction with the planned "Hanover–Gemünden supplementary line", which was listed in Deutsche Bundesbahn's expansion program (Ausbauprogramm für das Netz) of 1970, the Aschaffenburg–Würzburg supplementary line (Ergänzungsstrecke) was designated as a planned new line. This was to relieve the congested section between Gemünden and Würzburg.

The line would cross the Spessart towards Würzburg, initially running approximately parallel and north of Autobahn A 3 to Waldaschaff and cross the Main at Hafenlohr. The connection to the existing line would be made north of Würzburg and the route length be shortened from 90 kilometres to 67 kilometres and the running time from 50 minutes to 25 minutes. The quadruplication of the existing line was considered, but it was not pursued due to the substandard route east of Aschaffenburg, the Spessart ramp and the narrow profile of the Schwarzkopf Tunnel. In mid-1971, the line was one of four "supplementary lines" with the highest priority level, which were planned to be largely realised by 1980.

==== Federal Transport Infrastructure Plan 1973 ====
The Federal Transport Infrastructure Plan (Bundesverkehrswegeplan) 1973 contained a line between Würzburg and Aschaffenburg as one of seven planned high-speed railways. Construction of the planned 65 kilometre-long new line was estimated to cost around DM 1.2 billion.

In the pre-planning as of November 1973, the line at Hösbach was to leave the existing line and run eastwards along the existing line to the southeast of Partenstein. It would continue north to Lohr am Main and south to Neuendorf. From there, the line would run in an arc in a southeasterly direction. South of Gemünden, in the vicinity of Wernfeld, it would connect with the new line coming from Hanover and run towards Würzburg-Zell along largely straight lines.

The planned new line encountered strong resistance from nature conservation associations, which feared damage to the Spessart, and was therefore abandoned by Deutsche Bundesbahn.

==== Federal Transport Infrastructure Plan 1980 ====
The Federal Transport Infrastructure Plan 1980, which was determined at the end of 1979, included as a "new project" the upgrading of the existing line between Aschaffenburg and Gemünden by 1990 instead of a section of new line. The estimated cost was DM 850 million.

The Hanover–Würzburg Süd project group, which was planning the southern route section of the Hanover–Würzburg new line at the railway division (Bundesbahndirektion) of Nuremberg, was commissioned to develop plans for the upgrade of the line between Gemünden and Aschaffenburg on 25 February 1980. In addition to the construction of a new tunnel in the area of the Spessart Ramp, this included the Nantenbach Curve (10 kilometres). The integration of the new tunnel into a new Aschaffenburg–Gemünden high-speed line was explicitly intended as an option. The planning of 1982 provided for a 37.6 kilometre-long section between Aschaffenburg and Gemünden upgraded for a maximum speed of 200 km/h (with the Linienzugbeeinflussung cab signalling and train protection system).

According to another source, an Aschaffenburg–Gemünden upgraded line was planned around 1982 and consisted of the Nantenbach Curve and an 18 kilometre-long bypass of the steep section to the west of the Schwarzkopf Tunnel. The new line would start southwest of Hösbach and connect with the existing line at Wiesthal. As part of the overall 28.0 kilometre-long line, which could be operated at 200 km/h, 7 tunnels would be built with a total length of eleven kilometres. A 32 kilometre-long upgrade was planned in 1983.

The Aktionsgemeinschaft Laufachtal (Laufach valley action group), which campaigned against the upgrade of the line, was founded at the beginning of March 1983 under the motto of Das Laufachtal muß leben (the Laufach valley must live).

==== Federal Transport Infrastructure Plan 1985 ====
Finally, the Federal Transport Infrastructure Plan 1985 included an upgrade of the line between Gemünden and Aschaffenburg only in the "planning" category. DM 520 million was provided for the “Aschaffenburg–Gemünden upgraded line”.

==== Federal Transport Infrastructure Plan 1992 ====
The Federal Transport Infrastructure Plan 1992 contained the ABS/NBS Hanau–Nantenbach/Würzburg–Iphofen project as an “urgent need” with an estimated cost of DM 1.495 billion.

An area sensitivity test for the Hanau–Fulda/Würzburg new and upgraded railway (Neu- und Ausbaustrecke Hanau–Fulda/Würzburg) in 2002 excluded straightening of the winding section east of Heigenbrücken due to very high to extremely high sensitivities of the large-scale continuous, uncut forest areas. A low-impact corridor could not be found for a possible environmental impact assessment.

==== Construction of the new Spessart Ramp ====
The need to avoid the costly and rolling stock-intensive use of pusher locomotives between Laufach and Heigenbrücken and also to increase the maximum speed on this section, led the Federal Ministry of Transport to decide to fundamentally re-route the entire section on 28 August 2006. Following the award of contracts to a consortium, construction began in the summer of 2013.

The newly built section, which was opened on 19 June 2017, shortened the rail route between Würzburg and Aschaffenburg by half a kilometre. It forms section 3 of the planned “Hanau–Nantenbach upgraded railway” (Ausbaustrecke Hanau–Nantenbach).

== Route ==
The Main–Spessart railway is 112.5 kilometres long, although the system of kilometre markings change in Aschaffenburg. This is a relic from the time when the section north of Aschaffenburg was operated by non-Bavarian railway administrations. After leaving Würzburg Hauptbahnhof, the line first passes the new port and the marshalling yard, which was closed in 2004 by the then Railion (now DB Cargo). Before reaching Veitshöchheim station, which is noteworthy for its entrance building, the Main–Spessart railway crosses the Hanover–Würzburg high-speed railway, which crossed the Main valley here on a 30-metre-high bridge. The line continues to follow the Main valley, where in places the very cramped right bank side is shared with the Bundesstraße 27. In Wernfeld, it meets the tracks of the Wern Valley Railway (Werntalbahn) from Waigolshausen, although the two lines do not initially connect but run parallel. In the vicinity of Gemünden the line makes an almost 180° degree curve next to the Main and again passes under the high-speed line.

The Nantenbach Curve (Nantenbacher Kurve) connects the Main–Spessart railway and the Hanover–Würzburg high-speed railway between the operations yard of Rohrbach on the high-speed line and Nantenbach junction, east of Lohr, on the Main–Spessart railway. This shortcut allows long-distance trains to use the high-speed line between Würzburg and Lohr and shortens their travel times considerably as the curvy section through the Main valley only permits moderate speeds.

From Lohr, it heads west through the Spessart. From Lohr station (200 metres above sea level), the line climbed steadily for 20 kilometres to Heigenbrücken (275 m ASL) until 2017. Immediately west of Heigenbrücken station, it passed through the 926 metre-long almost horizontal Schwarzkopf Tunnel. At the western end of the tunnel at Hofgut Wendelstein was the highest point of the line and the Heigenbrücken West operations yard, where pusher locomotives were detached and returned to Laufach. As far as Laufach station (175 m ASL), the line ran over the Spessart Ramp, the trains on the 5.2 kilometre-long route overcame a height difference of 100 metres, corresponding to an average slope of 1.9%. In fact, this varied between 1.54 and 2.17%. The section from a point east of Heigenbrücken to Laufach is now bypassed by a new line with four tunnels. Shortly before the halt of Hösbach the line crosses the A 3.

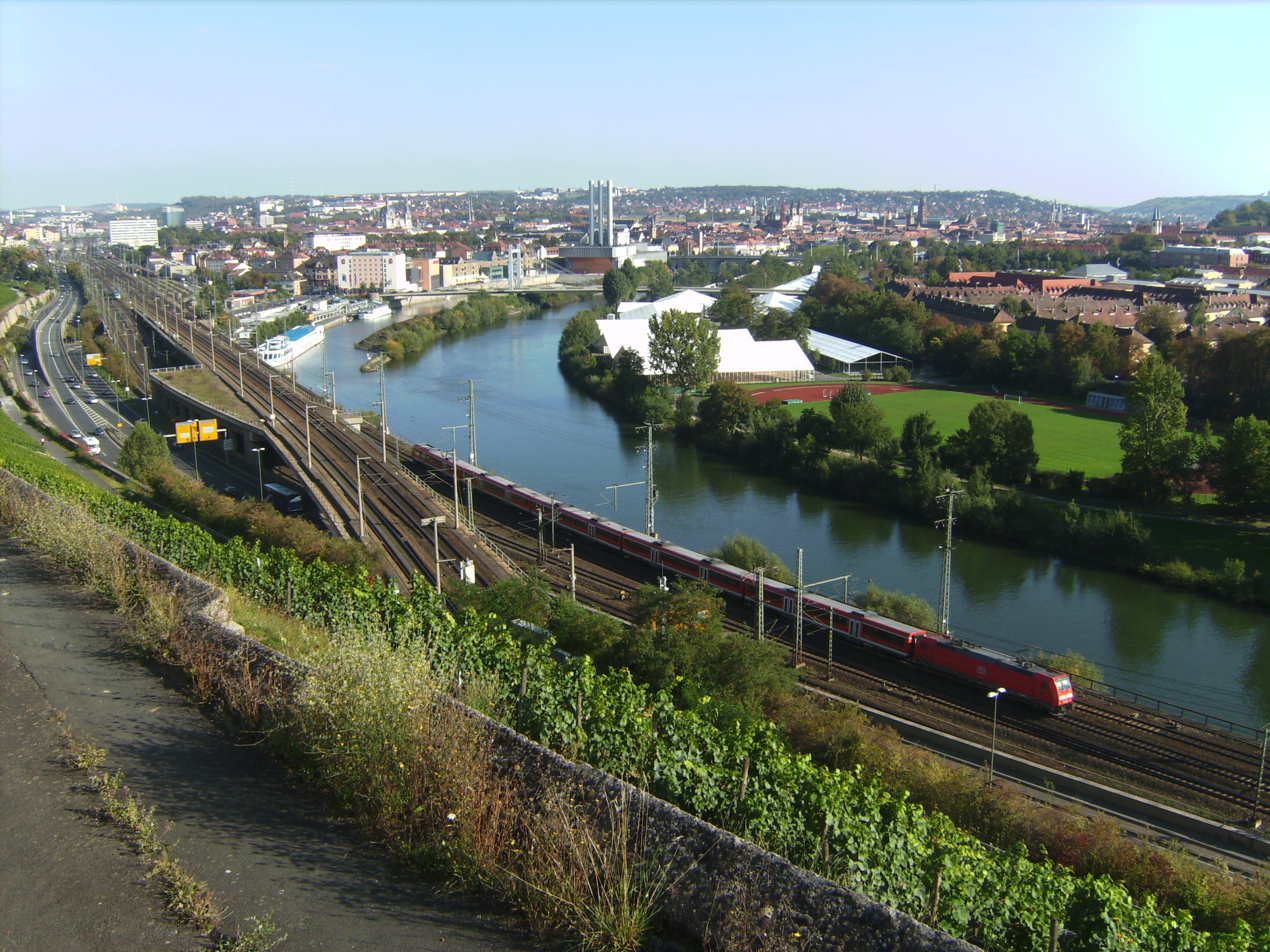
Regional-Express service from Frankfurt approaching Würzburg

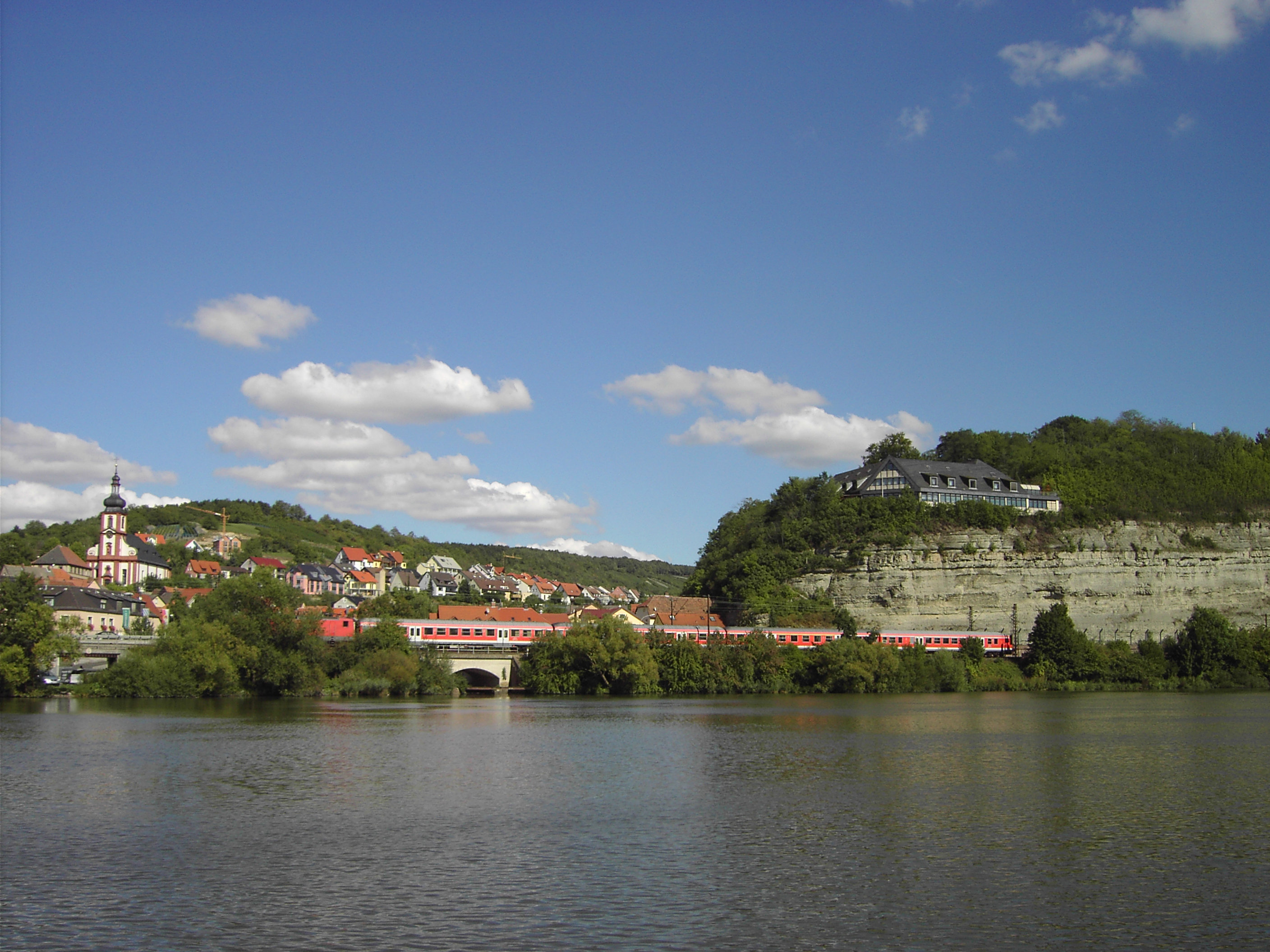
Regionalbahn service in Retzbach-Zellingen

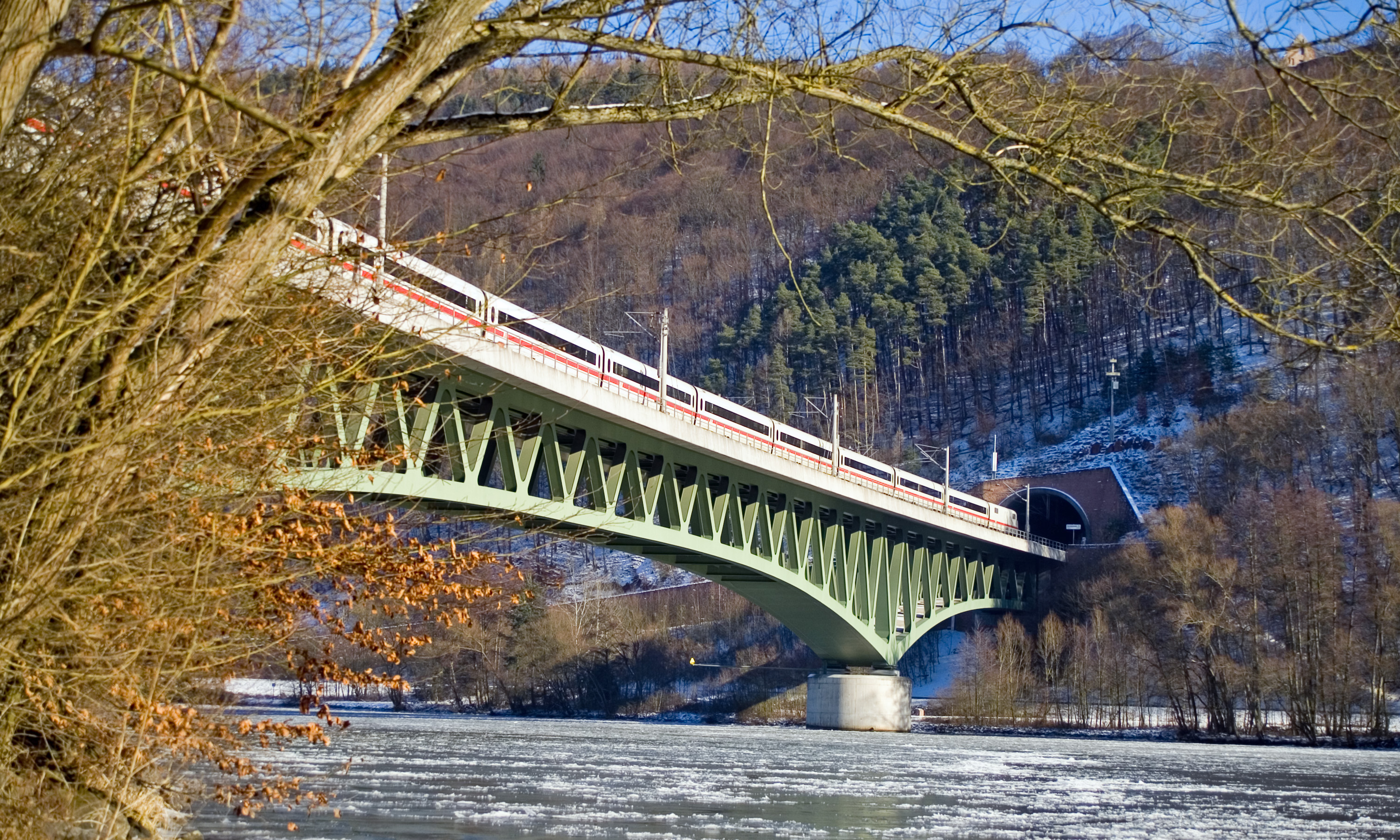
ICE service on the Nantenbach Curve

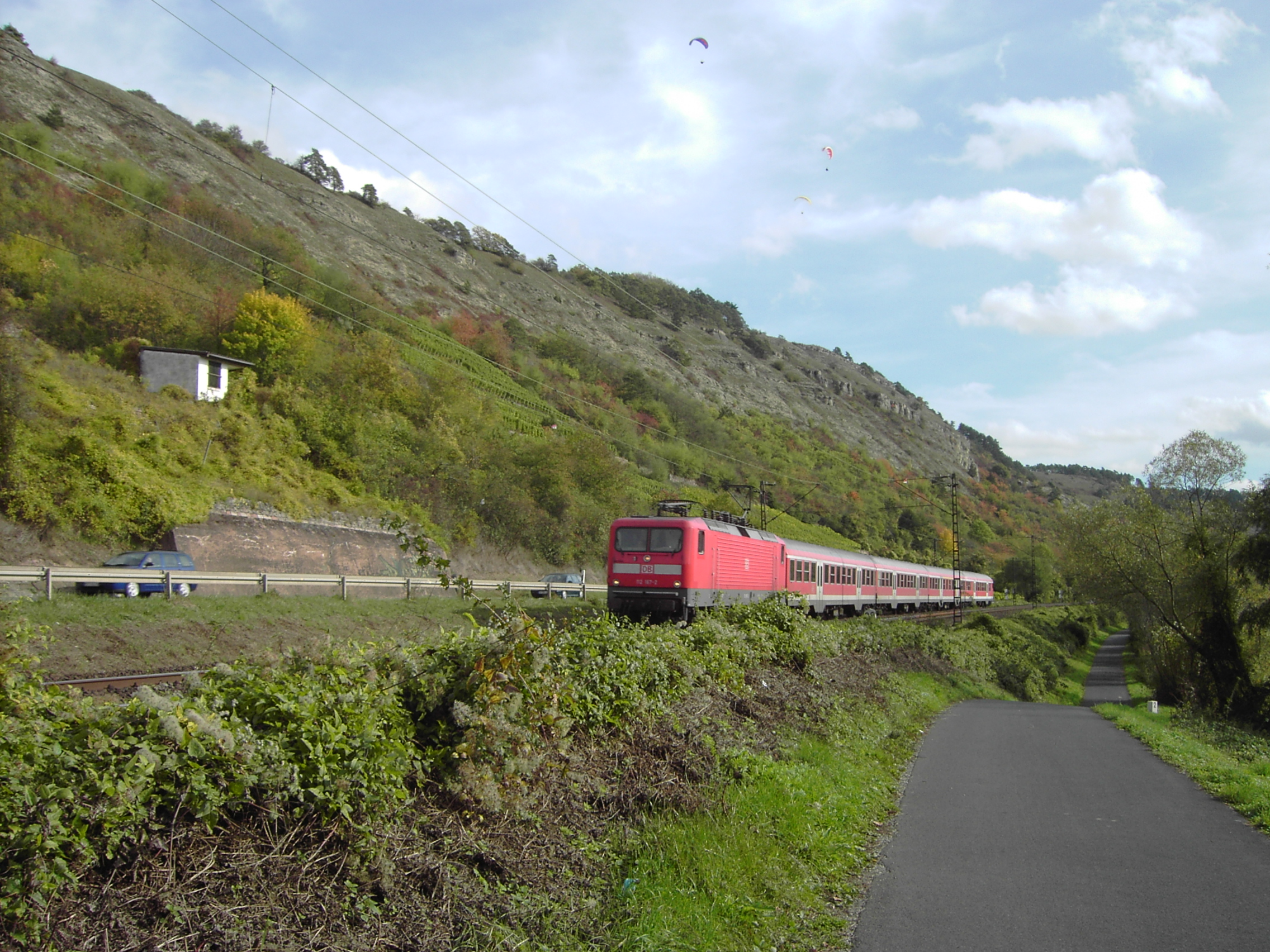
Regionalbahn service in the Main valley

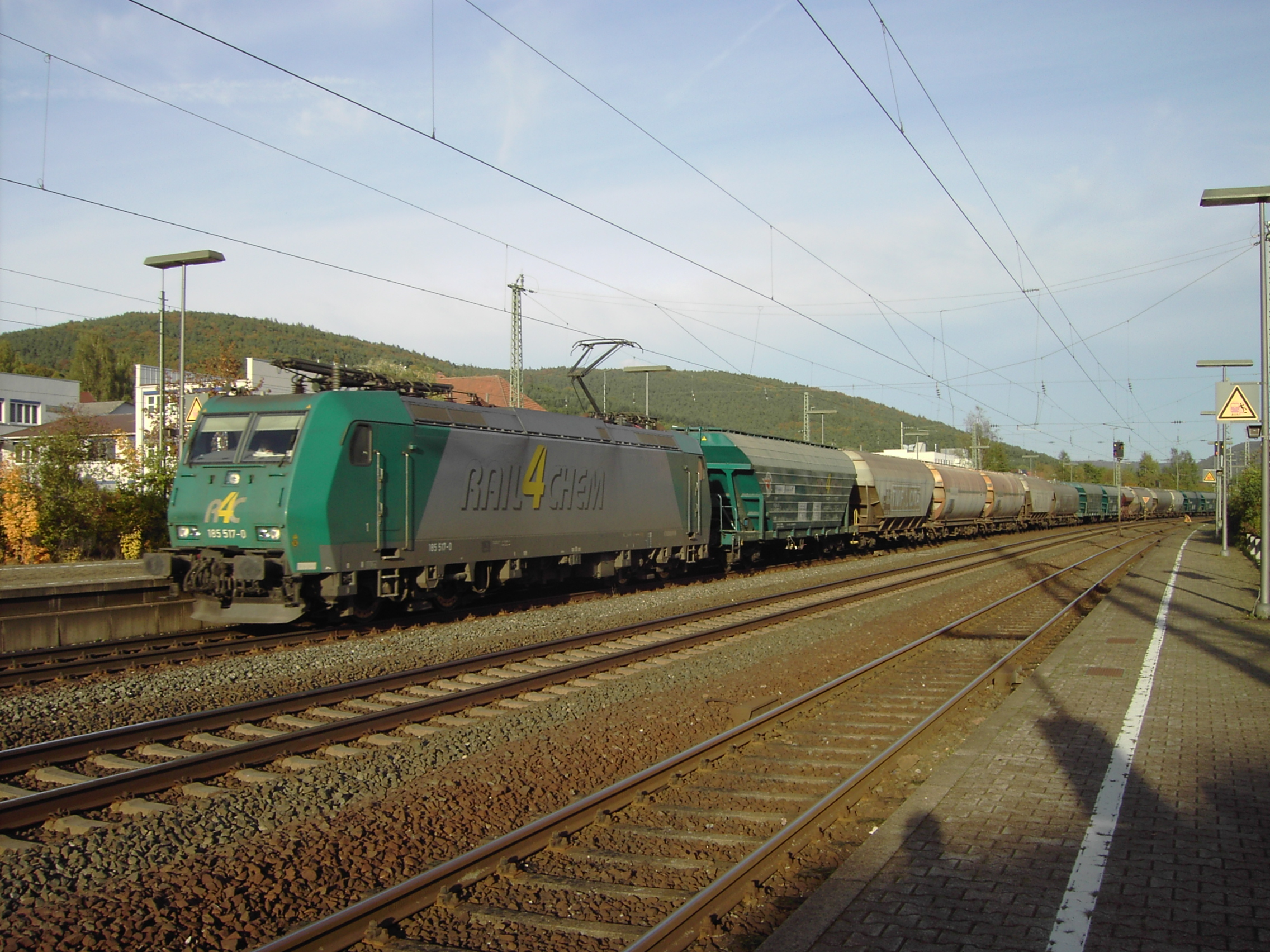
Freight train passes through Lohr station

== Operations ==
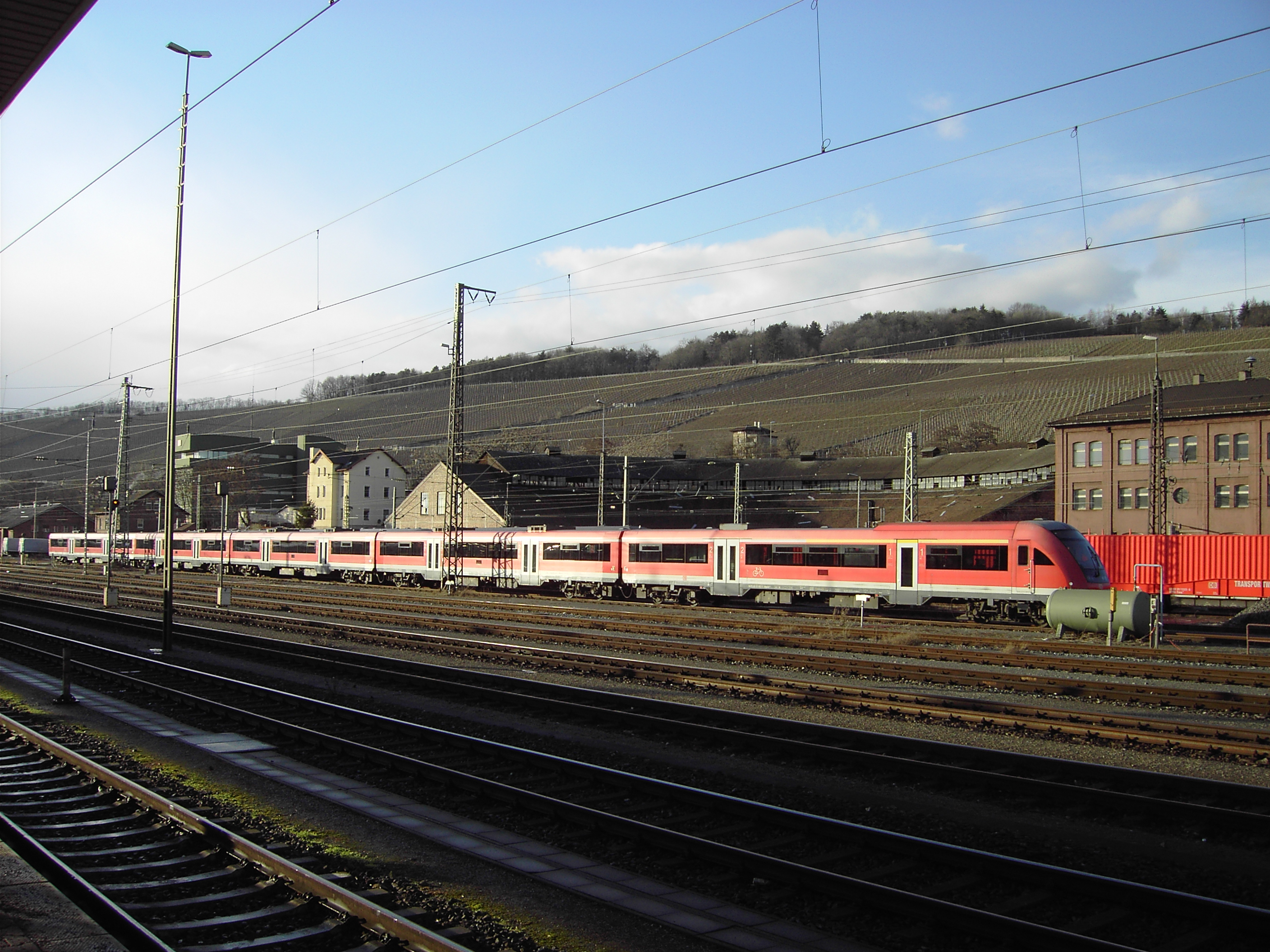
Modus-Wagen train on a Würzburg – Frankfurt am Main service

The Main-Spessart Railway between the junction with the Nantenbach Curve and Hanau is used by long-distance services, but elsewhere passenger services are dominated by local services. Until recently, an exception was the Saturday Intercity train pair, branded Rottaler Land, from Passau and Mühldorf to Hamburg, between Würzburg and Fulda and used the North–South railway instead of the high-speed line and stopped in Gemünden (Main). At the timetable change in December 2014, it was discontinued and was the last long-distance train pair to run on this section.

With the commissioning of the Cologne–Frankfurt high-speed rail line, ICE trains replaced the former Intercity services on the Ruhr–Frankfurt–Munich corridor, initially running every two hours and hourly since December 2006. In addition, a long-distance services run from Passau to Dortmund via the Main–Spessart railway every two-hours. It uses the West Rhine Railway (Linke Rheinstrecke) between Frankfurt and Cologne and runs through the Ruhr via Wuppertal in the Bergisches Land. Some trains of this service begin in Vienna or Budapest and continue to Hamburg or Kiel. Intercity, Eurocity and Intercity-Express services of the first generation run alternatively here. A Vienna–Frankfurt am Main ICE service was established on the line, in collaboration with the Austrian Federal Railways, and operated with tilting ICE sets from December 2007. During the day, if the Hanover–Würzburg high-speed line is not available for passenger trains, individual long-distance trains run between Frankfurt and Würzburg over the full length of the Main–Spessart railway. In addition, individual long-distance trains run between Hanover and Würzburg over the Main–Spessart railway between Gemünden and Würzburg.

In local traffic, the line is served hourly by Regional-Express services on the Würzburg–Aschaffenburg–Hanau–Frankfurt route. The services that previously ran to Nuremberg were largely abandoned in December 2006, since there is cross-platform interchange in Würzburg with services to and from Nuremberg. The rolling stock used on the line is mainly composed of push-pull trains composed of double-deck cars. Trains composed of Modus (converted from old Deutsche Bahn carriages in 1998-99) or Silberling carriages, hauled by locomotives of class 111 or class 146 are occasionally used, although the class 146 locomotives are operated mostly in "sandwich" mode (one locomotive at the front and one at the back of the train). Every two hours, the RE services continue from Würzburg to Schweinfurt and Bamberg and vice versa. These cycles consist of five double-deck coaches hauled by a class 146.2 based at the Nuremberg depot. A Regionalbahn service, which runs on the Würzburg–Gemünden section, is offset by approximately thirty minutes from the hourly Regional-Express service; it generally runs from Schweinfurt or Bamberg and continues through Gemünden to Jossa or Schlüchtern. On weekdays, during peak hours, there are also some additional trains between Würzburg and Karlstadt, which come from Treuchtlingen. Regionalbahn services also run from Aschaffenburg to Heigenbrücken hourly, with some continuing to Gemünden.

== Fare zones ==
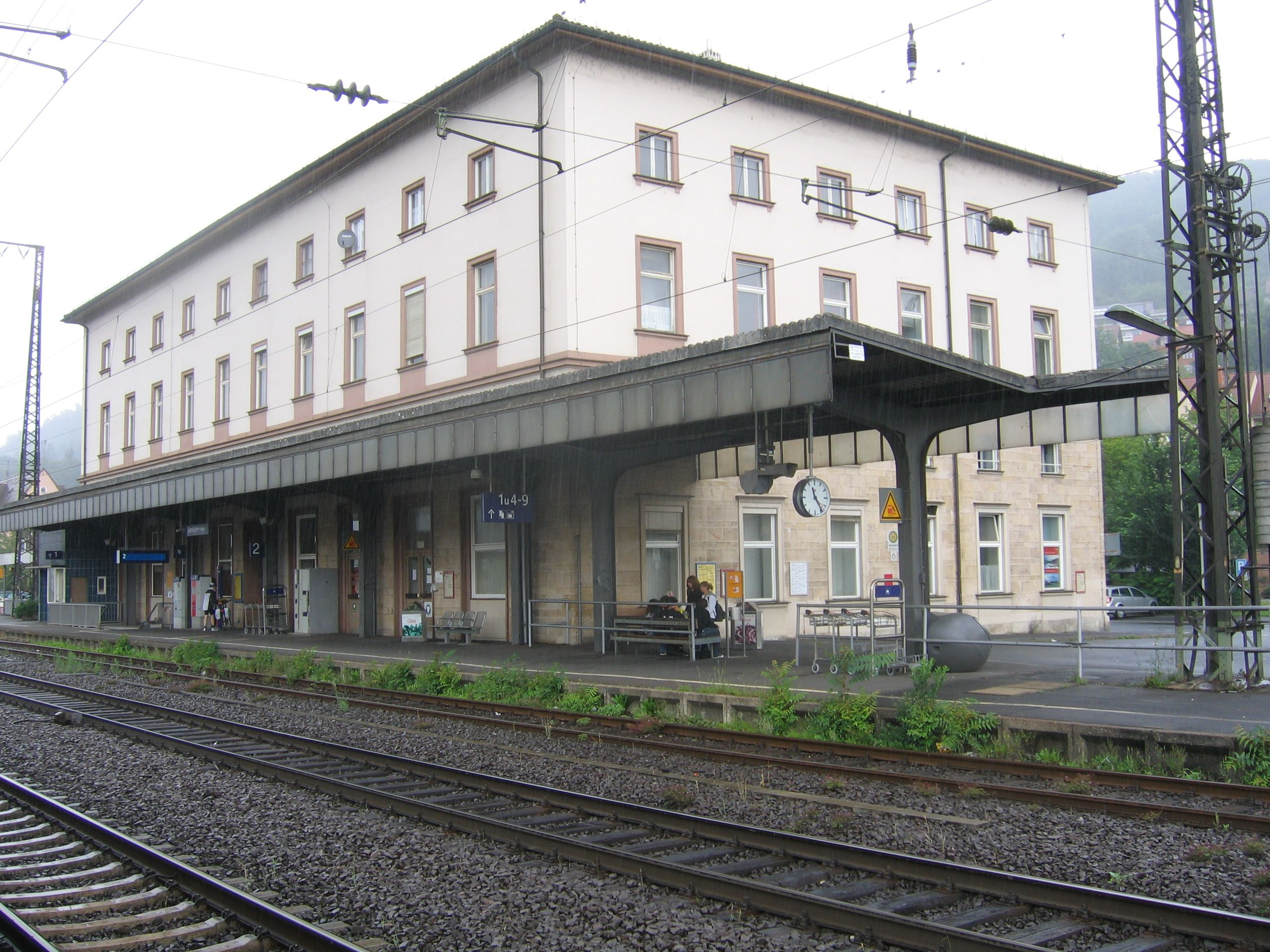
Gemünden station, platform side

Since 1 August 2013, the Main–Spessart railway from Würzburg to Wiesthal has been part of the fare zone of the Verkehrsverbund Mainfranken (Main-Franconia transport association, VVM), which replaced the former Würzburger Tarifverbund (Würzburg fare association, WTV) on 1 August 2004. The section from Heigenbrücken to Aschaffenburg is located in both the Verkehrsgemeinschaft am Bayerischen Untermain (Transport association of Bavrarian Lower Main, VAB) and the transition area of the Rhein-Main-Verkehrsverbund (Rhine-Main transport association, RMV), the main fare area of which begins at Großkrotzenburg station between Aschaffenburg and Hanau.

== Prospects ==
=== Mottgers Link ===
A project called the Mottgers Link (Mottgers-Spange) involves a new line from the Frankfurt area towards Fulda and possibly towards Würzburg. One option being considered would consist of a section of new line branching off from the Kinzig Valley Railway in the area of Wächtersbach to connect with the Hanover–Würzburg high-speed line between Würzburg and Fulda. If a southern variant of this project was realised, long-distance trains between Würzburg and Frankfurt would in future bypass the Main–Spessart railway and use the Hanau–Gemünden section of the line towards Fulda. The project was temporarily postponed and resumed in 2013. The selection of a route on a large-scale has not yet been determined.

=== Lohr bypass ===
In early October 2010, the Arbeitsgemeinschaft Bahndreieck Spessart (Spessart rail triangle working group) proposed a line running north of Lohr. This approximately four-kilometre-long new line through a tunnel was designed to accelerate through traffic and reduce noise pollution. By contrast, regional trains would continue to operate on the existing line.

=== Renovations at stations ===
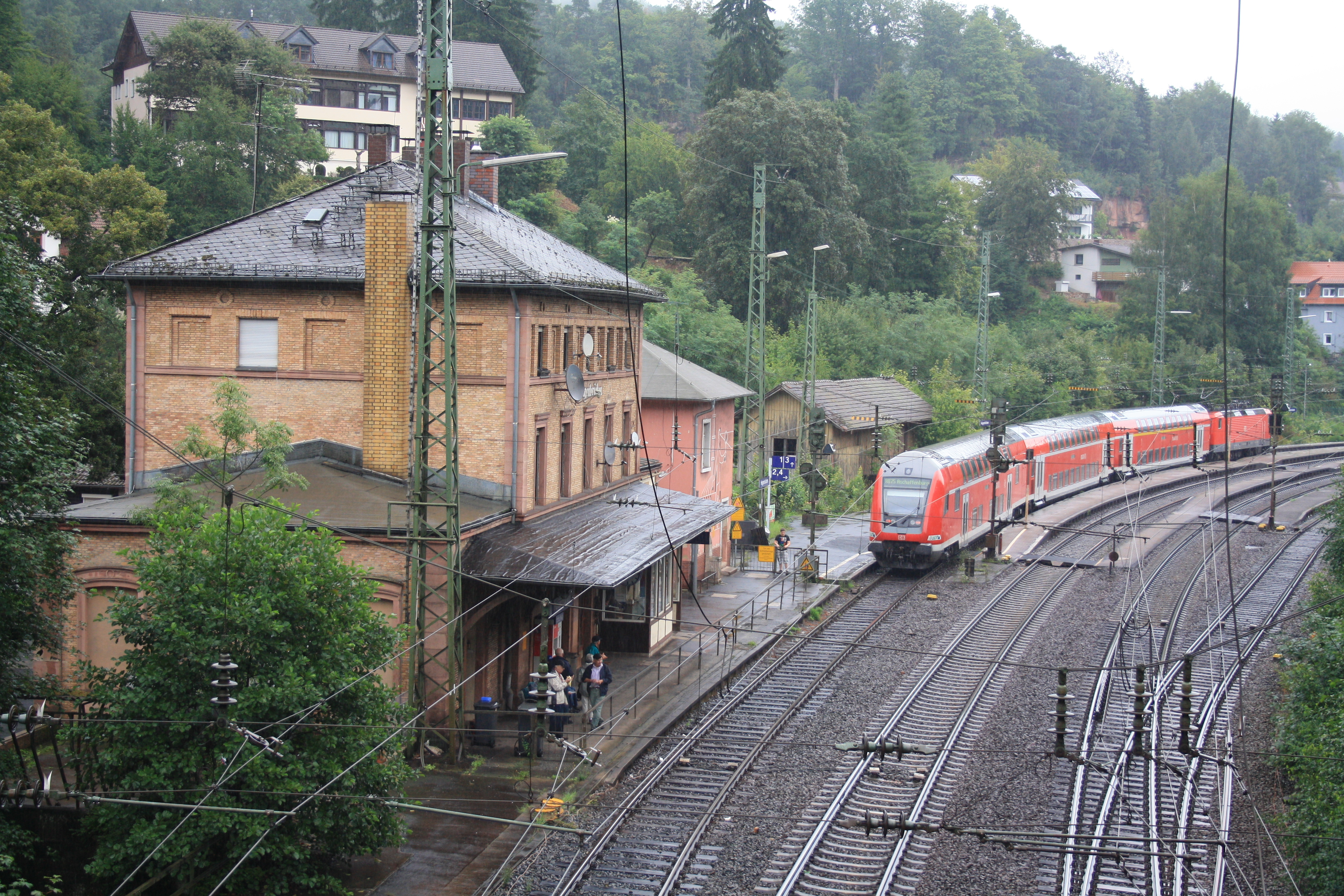
Former Heigenbrücken station

The new halt (Haltepunkt) of Mainaschaff Nord will replace the previous halt of Rückersbacher Schlucht. Two halts are being planned in Hösbach Ort and Aschaffenburg Ost.

Only three of the 17 stations on the line have not been upgraded to make them barrier-free.

In Wernfeld, the former station at the junction of the Main–Spessart railway and the Wern Valley Railway was abandoned in favour of a stop closer to the centre, which was completed in the summer of 2002 after 13 months of construction. The total cost of the two external platforms built using prefabricated parts amounted to €2.3 million. Two new prefabricated external platforms and a new underpass were installed in Veitshöchheim station at a cost of €3.2 million. Aschaffenburg Hauptbahnhof experienced a comprehensive modernisation up to 2008.
