= Veitshöchheim station =

Railway station in Würzburg, Germany

Veitshöchheim
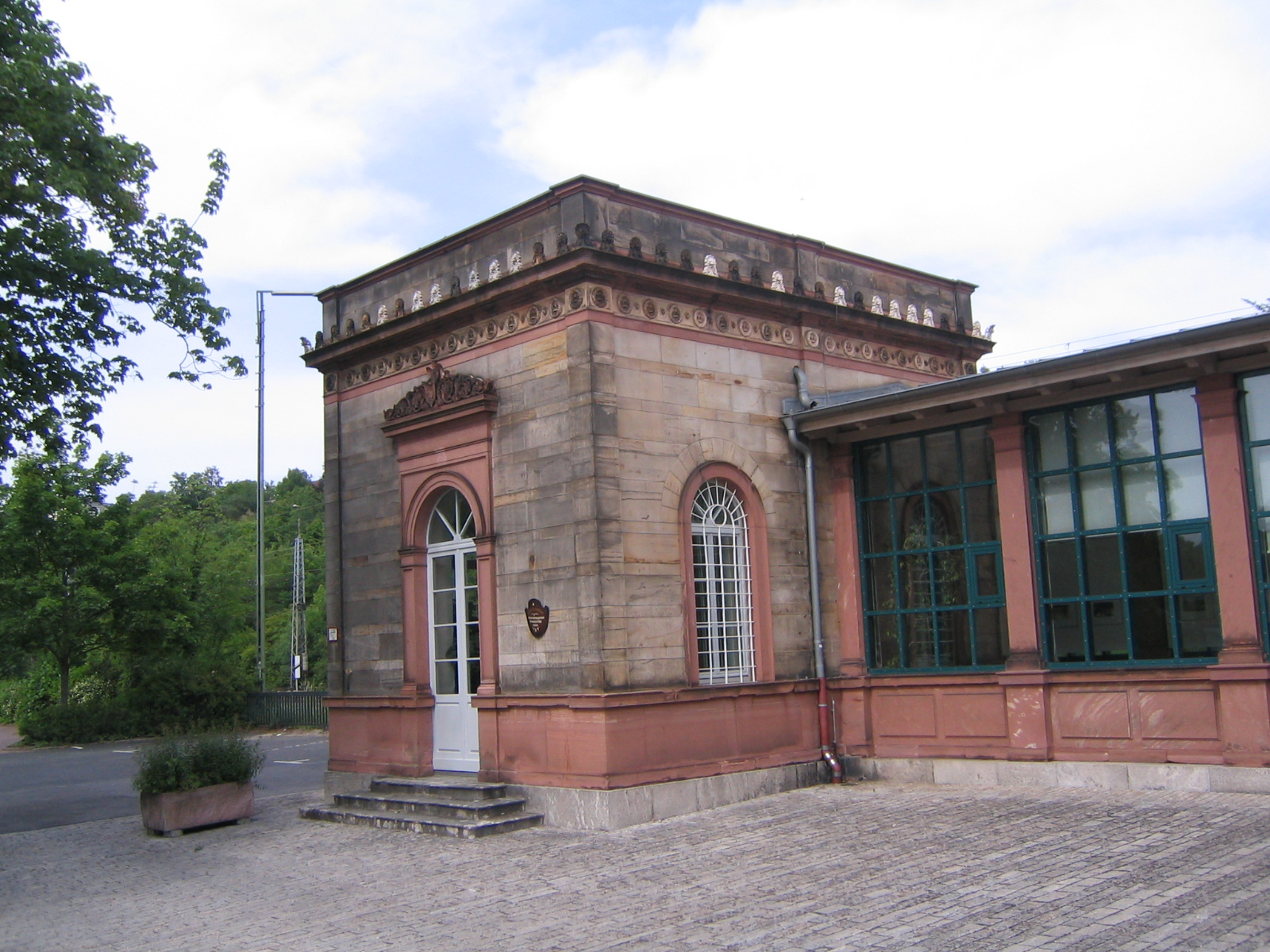
- King's wing of Veitshöchheim station, on the right part of the covered walkway

General information
- Location: Bahnhofstraße 11, Veitshöchheim, Bavaria; Germany
- Coordinates: 49°49′50″N 9°52′34″E
- Owner: Deutsche Bahn
- Operator: DB Station&Service
- Line: Würzburg–Aschaffenburg (KBS 800)
- Platforms: 2

Other information
- Station code: 6403
- DS100 code: NVE
- IBNR: 8006065
- Category: 6
- Fare zone: NVM: A/220
- Website: www.bahnhof.de; stationsdatenbank.de

History
- Opened: 1 October 1854

Passengers
- < 500 (2006)

Services
Preceding station	DB Regio Bayern	Following station
Thüngersheim towards Schlüchtern	RB 53	Würzburg-Zell towards Bamberg
Thüngersheim towards Aschaffenburg Hbf	RB 79	Würzburg-Zell towards Würzburg Hbf
Location
- Location within Bavaria Location within Germany Location within Europe

Veitshöchheim station is a regional railway station in southern Germany. It is at kilometre marker 7.0 on the Main-Spessart Railway from Würzburg to Aschaffenburg. It was built during the construction of Ludwig's Western Railway, which was taken fully into service on 1 October 1854.

The station was built in the immediate vicinity of Schloss Veitshöchheim, a summer residenz initially of the prince bishops of Würzburg, later the kings of Bavaria, at Veitshöchheim near Würzburg. The castle is especially well known for its surrounding rococo garden.

In the 19th century this park, which was then a public facility, was nearly destroyed by the construction of the railway. Engineers had planned to use the central avenue of the park for the trackbed of the railway. This idea was however vetoed by King Ludwig I, who ordered the line to be routed to the east around the castle gardens even though this was topographically less suited.

This was also where Veitshöchheim station came to be built. It was given a station building which was particularly representative of a spa town and which was to required to serve both as an excursion station for Würzburg's citizens visiting the park as well as acting as the station for the royal castle. The public station building was much larger than was warranted for Veitshöchheim which was only a village at the time. Next to this building a royal pavilion (Königspavillon) was built directly on the main axis of the castle acting as a private railway station. This was connected to the station building by a covered hallway. The royal pavilion is used today by the municipal library and by Veitshöchheim's youth hostel.

Between 2004 and 2005 the platforms at the station underwent extensive modernisation. For a total of €3.2 million, two new prefabricated outer platforms were built, which were sited a platform length towards the direction of Würzburg. A new underpass was built to act as access for the platforms. The old home and intermediate platforms were removed following the completion of the new ones in July 2005.

== Services ==
Train class	Route	Frequency
RB 53	(Schlüchtern – Jossa –) Gemünden (Main) – Karlstadt – Veitshöchheim – Würzburg – Schweinfurt (– Bamberg)	Hourly + individual trains in the peak between Karlstadt and Würzburg continue as RE 10 to Nuremberg
RE 54	Frankfurt – Maintal – Hanau – Aschaffenburg – Gemünden – Veitshöchheim – Würzburg	2 pairs of trains, all stops
RE 55	Frankfurt – Offenbach – Hanau – Aschaffenburg – Gemünden – Veitshöchheim – Würzburg	2 pairs of trains, all stops
RB 79	Aschaffenburg – Gemünden – Würzburg	1 pair of trains, all stops
As of 12 December 2021
