= Wern =

River in Germany

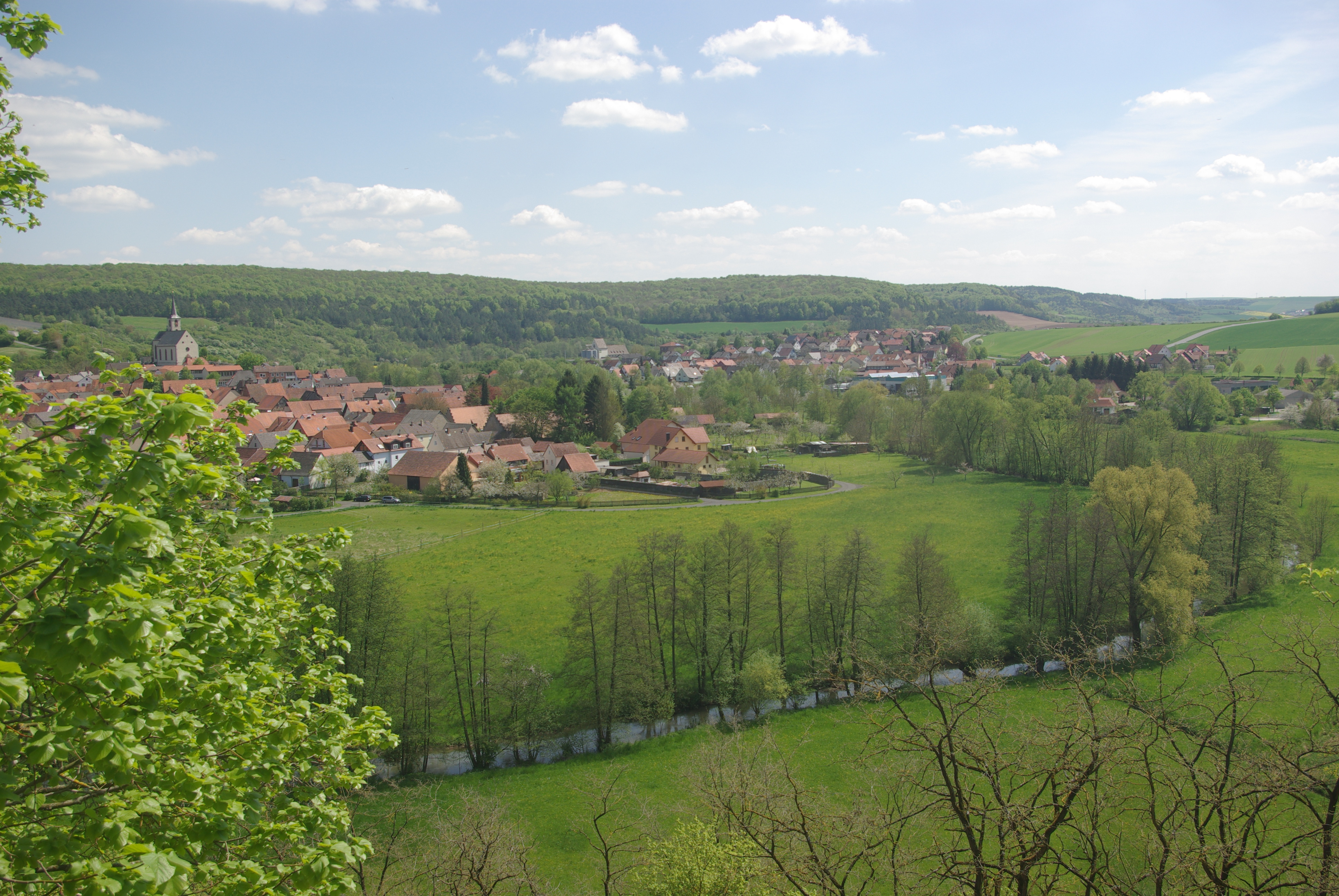
- Wern near the village of Eußenheim

Location
- Country: Germany
- State: Bavaria

Physical characteristics
- Mouth
  - location: Main
  - coordinates: 50.0283°N 9.7266°E
- Length: 70.9 km (44.1 mi)
- Basin size: 601 km^{2} (232 sq mi)

Basin features
- Progression: Main→ Rhine→ North Sea

The Wern is a river in Bavaria, Germany. It is a right tributary of the river Main, which it joins in Wernfeld.

== Etymology ==
The name was written in the 8th century as Werma and around the year 1015 as Werina. It is likely derived from the Indo-European root wódr̥ (pronounced udéns ), which means water or rain.

== Course ==
The Wern originates between Rannungen and Pfersdorf. Although there is a designated source, called Aubrunnen, about one kilometer northeast of the center of Pfersdorf, this river pours average only one to two liters per second and dries up completely in the summer. The Wern initially flows in a southerly direction, approaching the Main at Schweinfurt, but turns west 2 km away and flows through the northern part of the Maindreieck. After approaching the Main near Karlstadt-Stetten, it changes direction and continues northward. At Gemünden-Wernfeld, the Wern finally joins with the Main.

== See also ==
- List of rivers of Bavaria
