= Veitshöchheim =

- Municipality
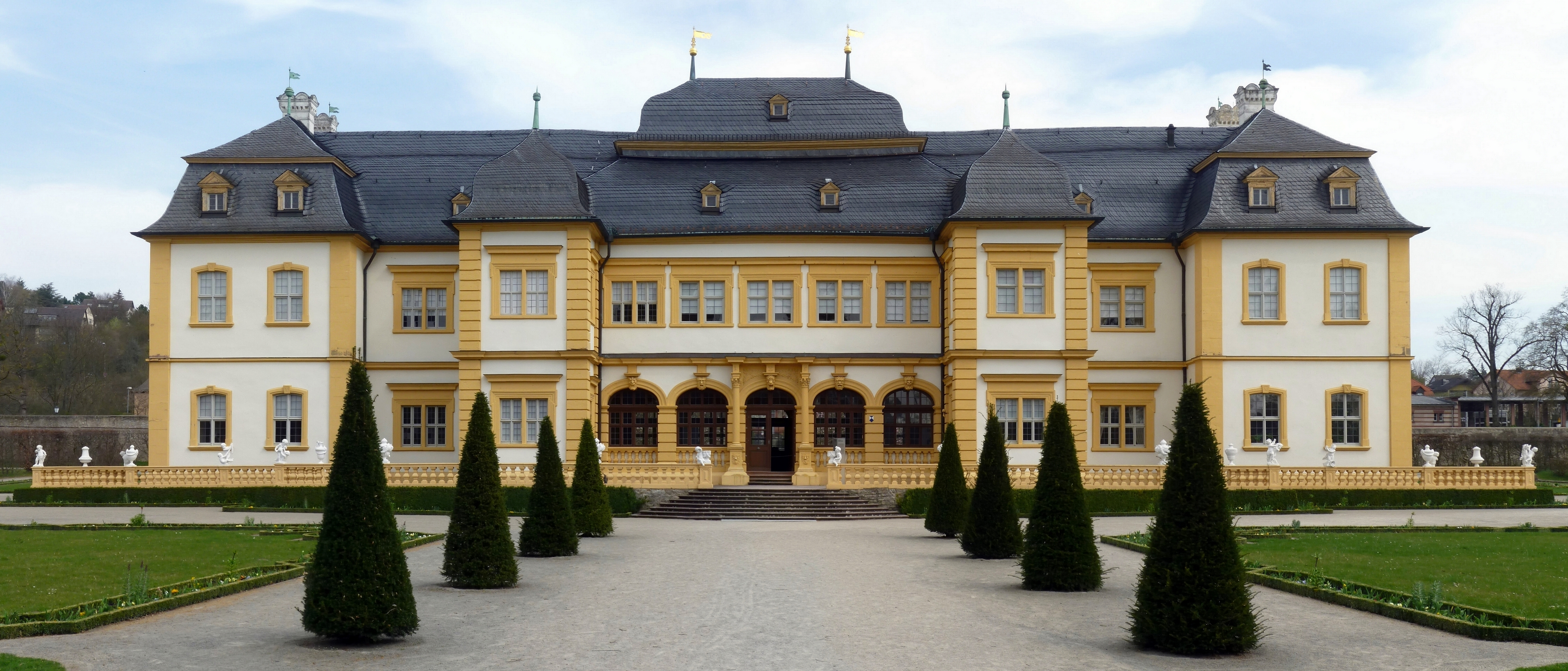
- Schloss Veitshöchheim

- Coat of arms

- Location of Veitshöchheim within Würzburg district
- Interactive map of Veitshöchheim
- Location within Germany Location within Bavaria
- Coordinates: 49°49′58″N 9°52′54″E
- Country: Germany
- State: Bavaria
- Admin. region: Unterfranken
- District: Würzburg
- Subdivisions: 3 Ortsteile

Government
  - Mayor (2020–26): Jürgen Götz (CSU)

Area
  - Total: 10.76 km^{2} (4.15 sq mi)
- Elevation: 167–281 m (548–922 ft)

Population (2025-12-31)
  - Total: 9,694
  - Density: 900.9/km^{2} (2,333/sq mi)
- Time zone: UTC+01:00 (CET)
  - Summer (DST): UTC+02:00 (CEST)
- Postal codes: 97209
- Dialling codes: 0931
- Vehicle registration: WÜ
- Website: www.veitshoechheim.de

Veitshöchheim (German pronunciation: [faɪ̯t͡sˈhøːçˌhaɪ̯m]) is a municipality in the district of Würzburg, in Bavaria, Germany. It is situated on the right bank of the Main, 6 kilometres (4 mi) northwest of Würzburg. Veitshöchheim has a population just under 10,000. It includes two villages: Veitshöchheim and Gadheim.

== Attractions ==
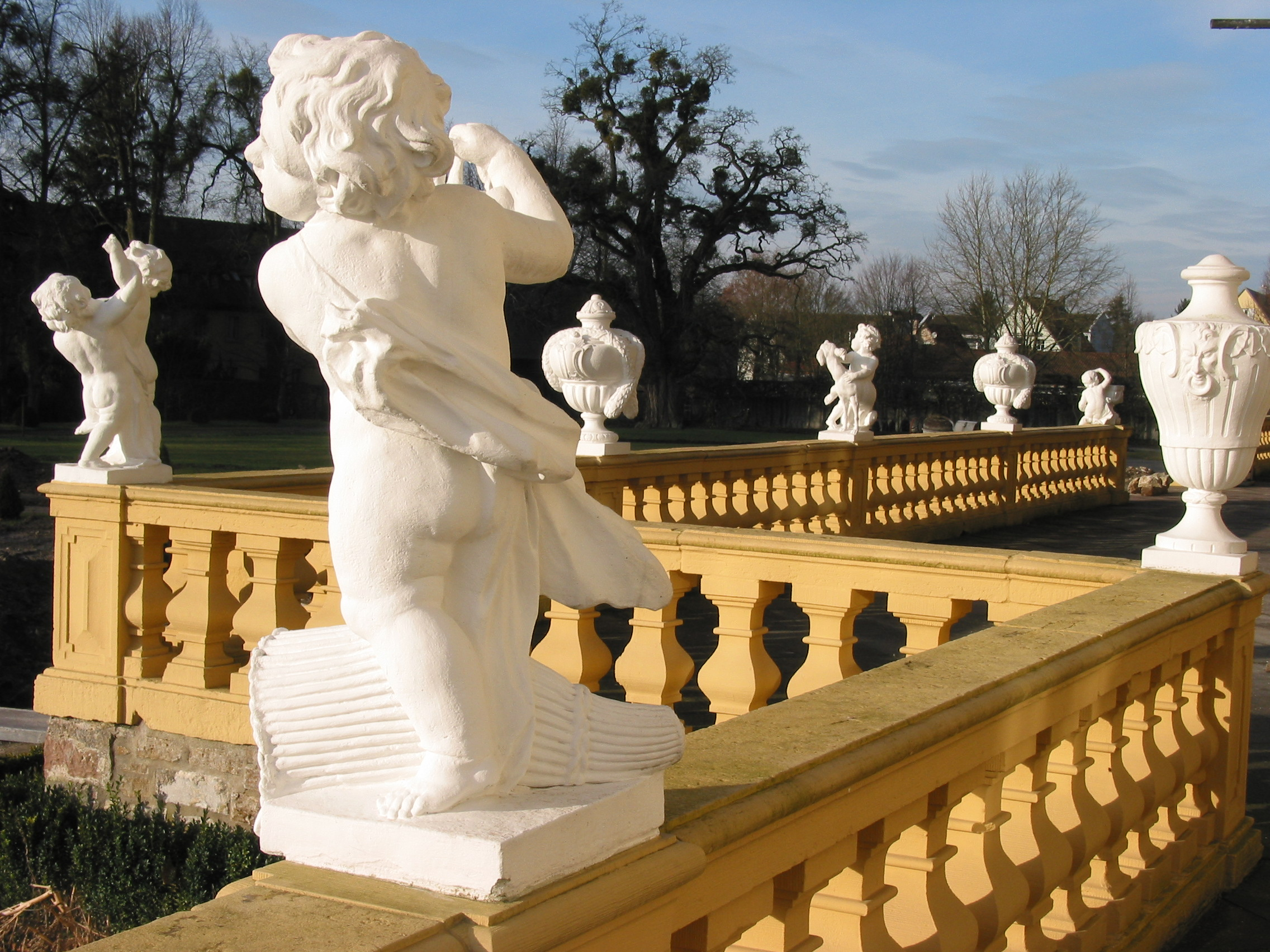
Statuary in the gardens at Schloss Veitshöchheim

=== Schloss Veitshöchheim ===
Schloss Veitshöchheim is located in the town. This summer palace of the Prince-Bishops of Würzburg was built in 1680–82, and was enlarged to its present appearance in 1753 by Balthasar Neumann. The gardens were redesigned for Prince-Bishop Adam Friedrich von Seinsheim (1755–1779), with lakes and waterworks, and filled with hundreds of allegorical sandstone sculptures from the workshops of the court sculptors Ferdinand Tietz and Johann Peter Wagner.

== Infrastructure ==
=== Transport ===
Veitshöchheim has a railway station near the Schloss with a former royal pavilion.

== Partner towns ==
- Rotava, Karlovy Vary Region, Czech Republic
- Pont-l'Évêque, Calvados, France
