= Eußenheim =

- Municipality
- Coat of arms

- Location of Eußenheim within Main-Spessart district
- Interactive map of Eußenheim
- Location within Germany Location within Bavaria
- Coordinates: 49°59′N 9°49′E
- Country: Germany
- State: Bavaria
- Admin. region: Unterfranken
- District: Main-Spessart

Government
  - Mayor (2020–26): Achim Höfling (FW)

Area
  - Total: 56.84 km^{2} (21.95 sq mi)
- Elevation: 176–225 m (577–738 ft)

Population (2025-12-31)
  - Total: 2,994
  - Density: 52.67/km^{2} (136.4/sq mi)
- Time zone: UTC+01:00 (CET)
  - Summer (DST): UTC+02:00 (CEST)
- Postal codes: 97776
- Dialling codes: 09350
- Vehicle registration: MSP
- Website: www.eussenheim.de

Eußenheim (or Eussenheim) is a municipality in the Main-Spessart district in the Regierungsbezirk of Lower Franconia (Unterfranken) in Bavaria, Germany.

== Geography ==
=== Location ===
Eußenheim lies on the river Wern in the Würzburg Region, in the Fränkisches Weinland (“Franconian Wineland”).

The community has the following Gemarkungen (traditional rural cadastral areas): Aschfeld, Bühler, Eußenheim, Hundsbach, Münster and Obersfeld.

There is also a hamlet in the community called Schönarts.

== History ==
From the 12th to the 16th century, the noble family of Heußlein lived here. The Parish Church of Saints Marcellinus and Peter, standing high above the village, was built in 1619. The former steward of the cathedral chapter of the Prince-Bishopric of Würzburg was, after Secularization in 1803, yielded up at Bavaria’s behest to Archduke Ferdinand of Tuscany in 1805 to form the Grand Duchy of Würzburg, with which it passed in 1814 to Bavaria. In the course of administrative reform in Bavaria, the current community came into being with the Gemeindeedikt (“Municipal Edict”) of 1818. In 1978, Eußenheim merged with the outlying community of Schönarts with the brookside centres of Aschfeld, Münster, Bühler, Hundsbach and Obersfeld into one, greater community.

=== Population development ===
Within town limits, 3,400 inhabitants were counted in 1970, 3,191 in 1987 and in 2000 3,374.

== Politics ==
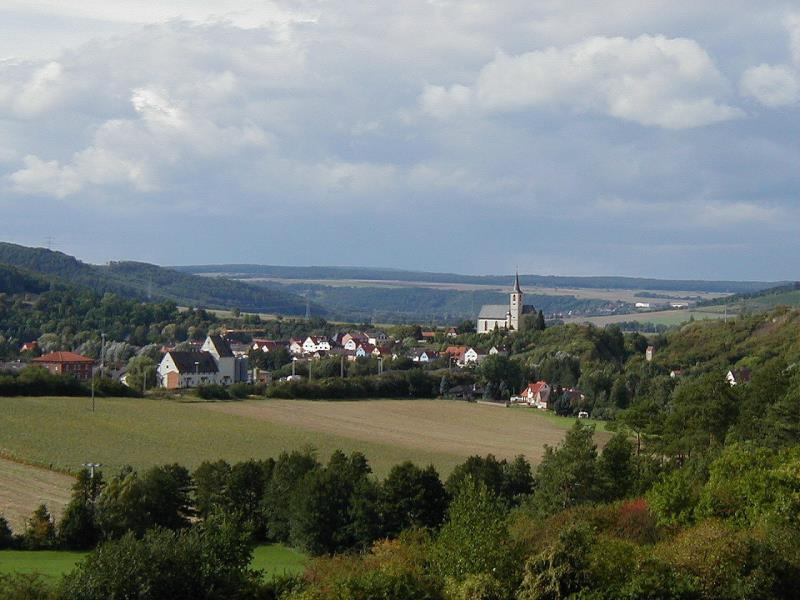
Eußenheim

The mayor is Achim Höfling, elected in March 2020.

Municipal taxes in 1999 amounted to €1,279,000 (converted), of which net business taxes amounted to €81,000.

=== Coat of arms ===
The community’s arms might be described thus: Tierced in mantle reversed, dexter gules two rows of lozenges argent in bend, sinister of the first a laurel twig in bend sinister of the second, in chief Or three roses of the first barbed of the second and seeded of the last.

== Culture and sightseeing ==
=== Buildings ===
- Parish Church of Saints Marcellinus and Peter
- Fortress church (Kirchenburg) in Aschfeld, built about 1500
- Bildstock hiking path (a Bildstock being one of the many decorated posts or columns found in Germany serving as roadside or out-of-the-way holy places)
- The nearby Homburg Castle, one of Germany’s biggest castle ruins

== Economy and infrastructure ==
After the fall of winegrowing in the 19th century came another upswing, after the Flurbereinigung in 1972.

According to official statistics, there were 128 workers on the social welfare contribution rolls working in producing businesses in 1998. In trade and transport this was 0. In other areas, 50 workers on the social welfare contribution rolls were employed, and 1268 such workers worked from home. There was one processing business. Three businesses were in construction, and furthermore, in 1999, there were 98 agricultural operations with a working area of 2 869 ha, of which 2 633 ha was cropland and 205 ha was meadowland.

=== Education ===
In 1999 the following institutions existed in Eußenheim:

- Kindergartens: 125 places with 123 children
- Primary school: 1 with 17 teachers and 279 pupils
