= Waigolshausen =

- Municipality
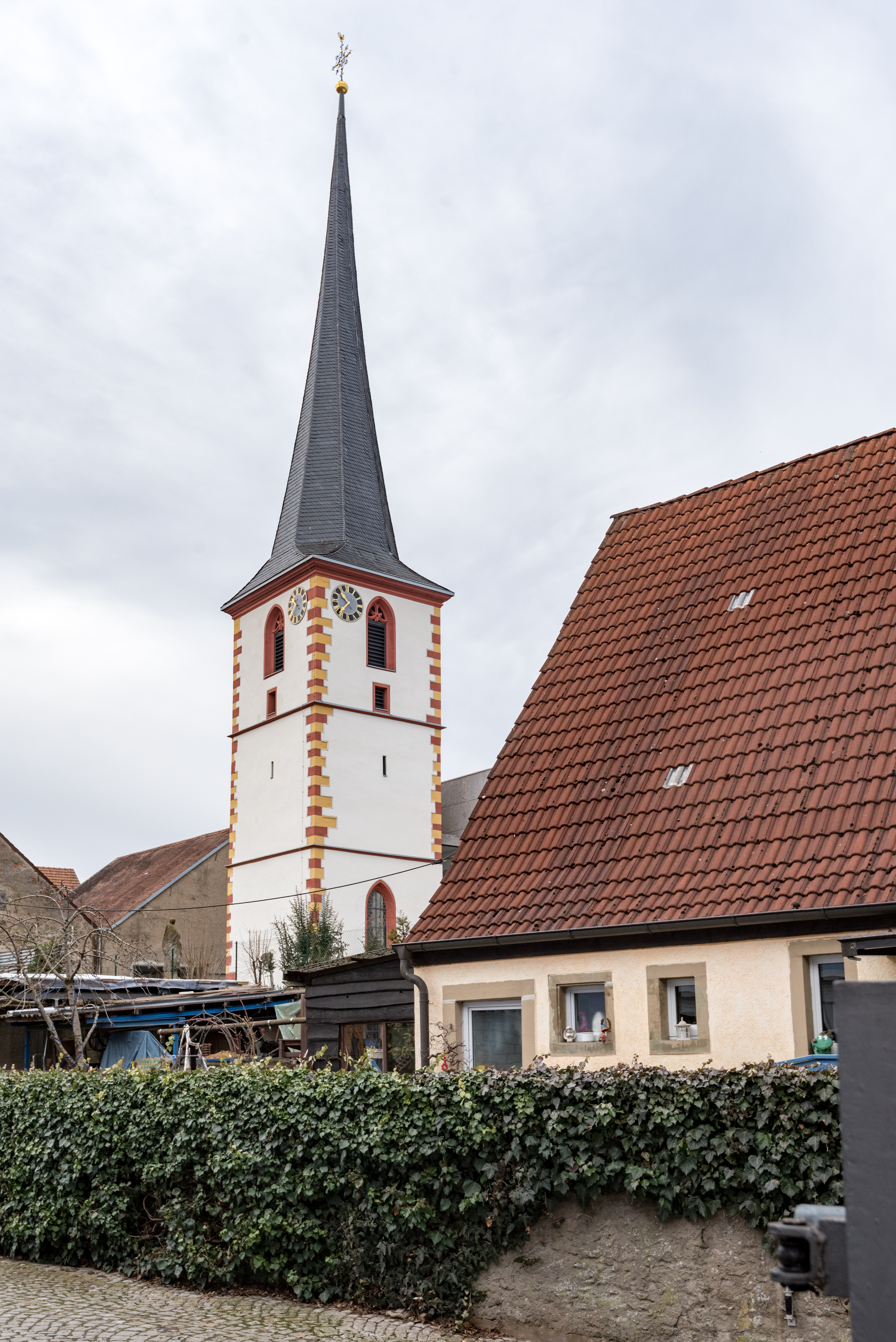
- Church of Saint James the Elder

- Coat of arms

- Location of Waigolshausen within Schweinfurt district
- Interactive map of Waigolshausen
- Location within Germany Location within Bavaria
- Coordinates: 49°57′N 10°8′E
- Country: Germany
- State: Bavaria
- Admin. region: Unterfranken
- District: Schweinfurt

Government
  - Mayor (2020–26): Christian Zeißner

Area
  - Total: 23.74 km^{2} (9.17 sq mi)
- Elevation: 247 m (810 ft)

Population (2025-12-31)
  - Total: 2,614
  - Density: 110.1/km^{2} (285.2/sq mi)
- Time zone: UTC+01:00 (CET)
  - Summer (DST): UTC+02:00 (CEST)
- Postal codes: 97534
- Dialling codes: Waigolshausen: 09722 Hergolshausen: 09722 Theilheim: 09384
- Vehicle registration: SW
- Website: www.waigolshausen.de

Waigolshausen is a municipality in the district of Schweinfurt in Bavaria, Germany.

== Twin towns – sister cities ==
Waigolshausen is twinned with:

- Carpiquet, France since 2018
