= Aubach =

Aubach may refer to various rivers in Germany:

- Aubach (Aar), Hesse, tributary of the Aar
- Aubach (at Schwerin), Mecklenburg-Vorpommern, tributary of the pond Pfaffenteich
- Aubach (Dill), Hesse, tributary of the Dill
- Aubach (Elsava), Bavaria, tributary of the Elsava
- Aubach (Lohr), Bavaria, tributary of the Lohr
- Aubach (Schwabach), Bavaria, tributary of the Schwabach
- Aubach (Wied), Rhineland-Palatinate, tributary of the Wied
- Aubach (Wiehl), North Rhine-Westphalia, tributary of the Wiehl
