= Bächlesbach =

River in Germany

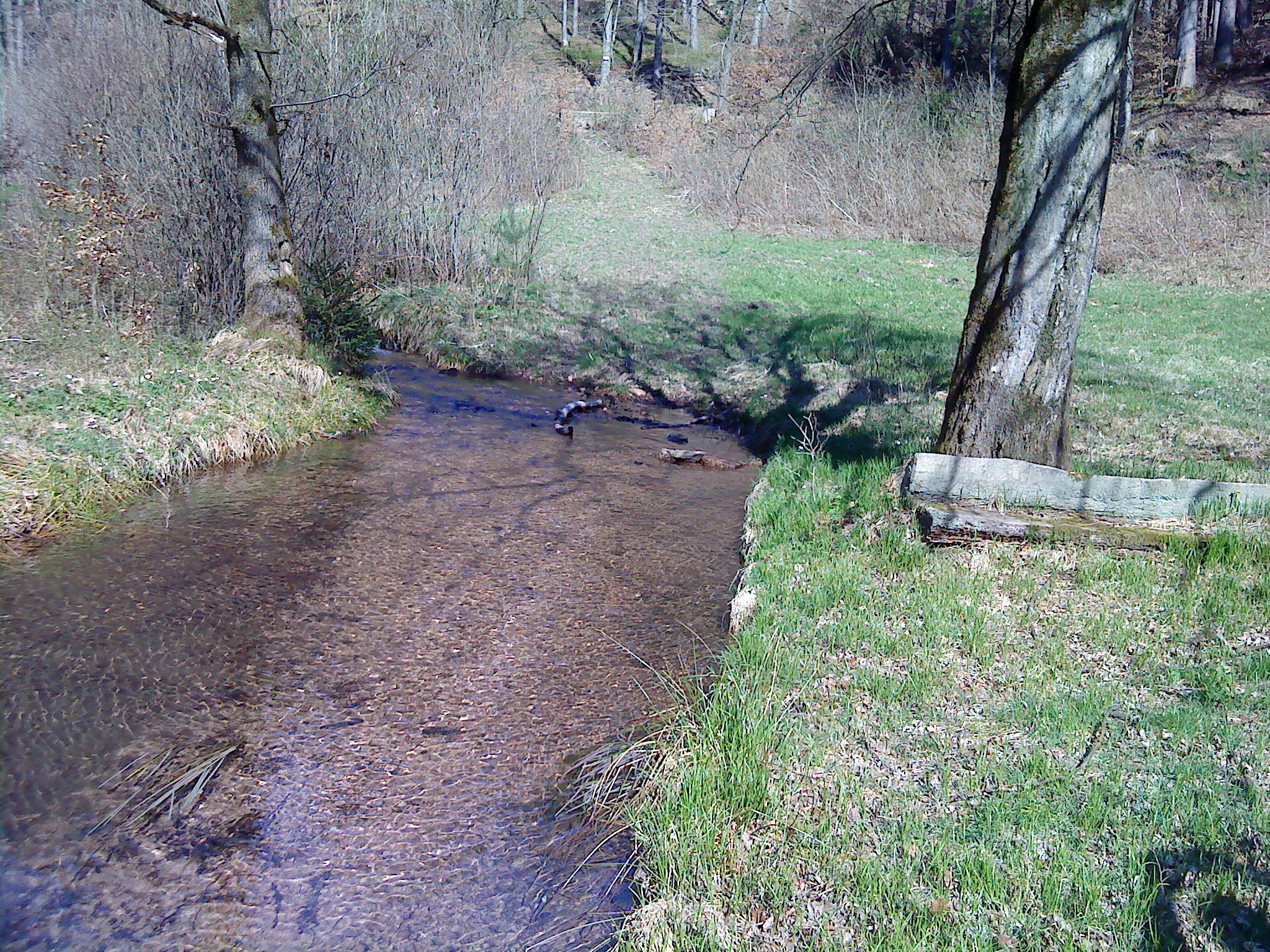
- The Bächlesbach in the nature reserve Spessartwiesen near Heigenbrücken

Location
- Country: Germany
- State: Bavaria

Physical characteristics
- Mouth
  - location: Lohrbach
  - coordinates: 50.0194°N 9.3911°E

Basin features
- Progression: Lohrbach→ Aubach→ Lohr→ Main→ Rhine→ North Sea

The Bächlesbach is a small river in Bavaria, Germany. It flows into the Lohrbach near Heigenbrücken.

== See also ==
- List of rivers of Bavaria
