= Body of water =

Any significant accumulation of water, generally on a planet's surface

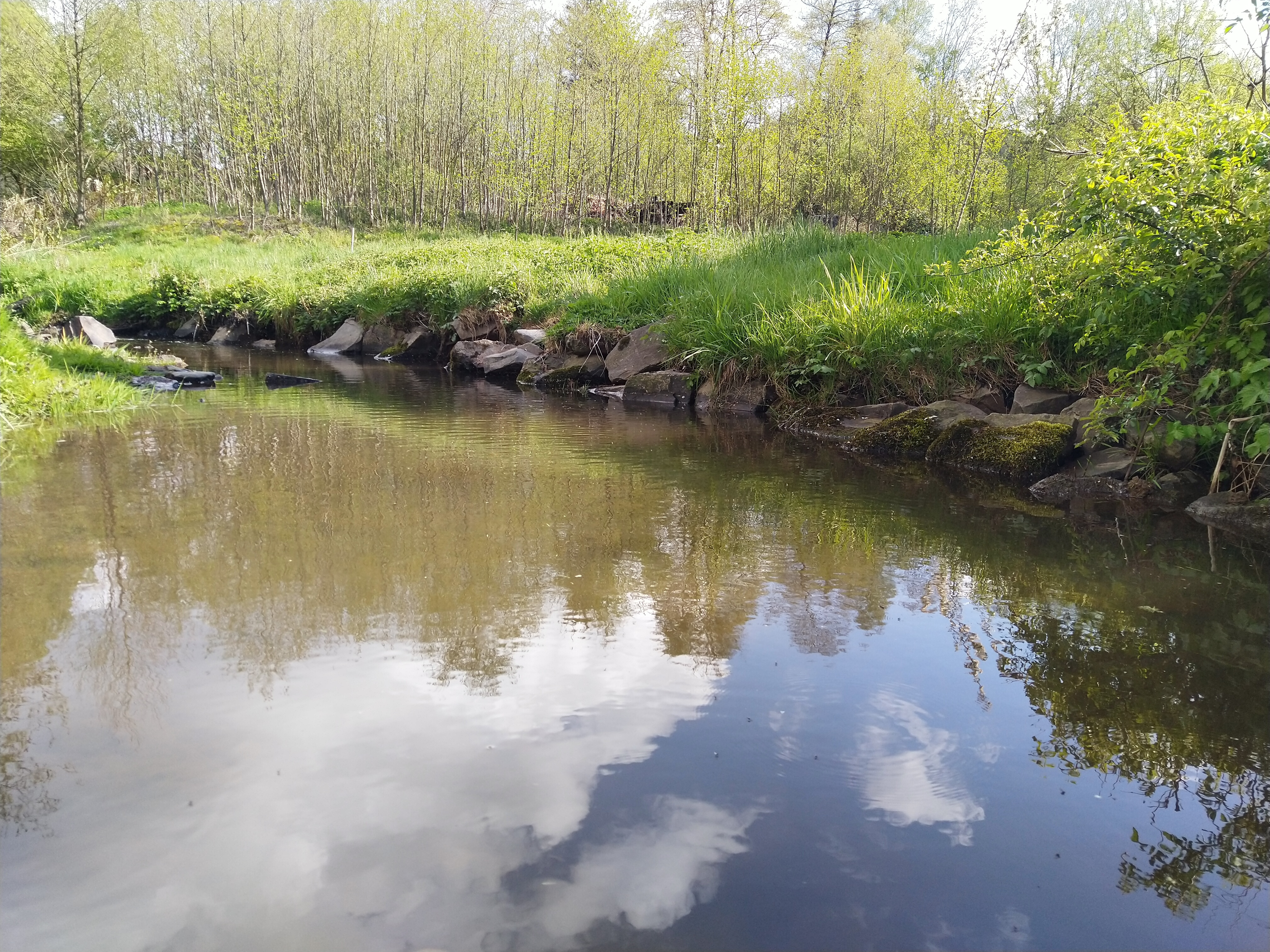
The Aubach, a watercourse in Germany

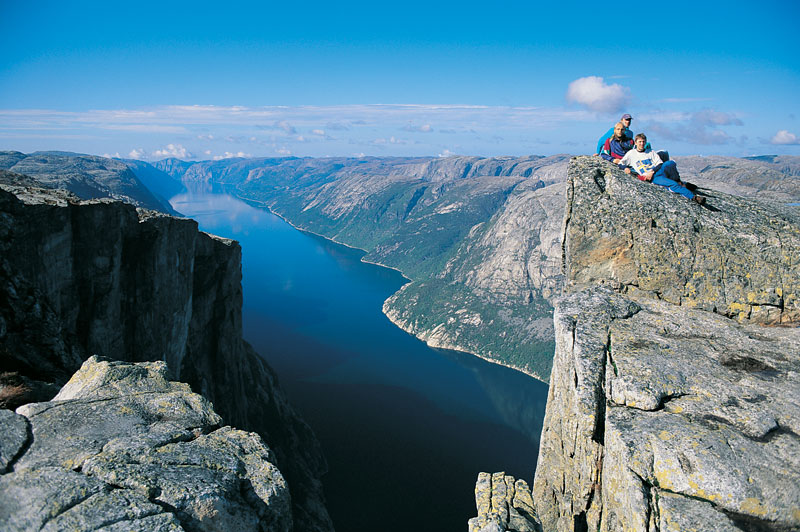
A fjord (Lysefjord) in Norway.

A body of water is a significant accumulation of water on the surface of the earth. The term most often refers to oceans, seas, and lakes, but it includes smaller pools of water such as ponds, wetlands, or more rarely, puddles. A body of water does not have to be still or contained; rivers, streams, canals, and other geographical features where accumulated water moves from one place to another are also considered bodies of water.

Most are naturally occurring and geographical features, but some are artificial. There are types that can be either. For example, most reservoirs are created by engineering dams, but some natural lakes are used as reservoirs. Similarly, most harbors are naturally occurring bays, but some harbors have been created through construction. Bodies of water that are navigable are known as waterways.

Bodies of water are affected by gravity, which is what may create the tidal effects. The impact of climate change on water is likely to intensify as observed through the rising sea levels, water acidification and flooding. This means that climate change has pressure on water bodies.

Climate change significantly affects bodies of water through rising temperatures, altered precipitation patterns, and sea-level rise. Warmer temperatures lead to the melting of glaciers and polar ice, contributing to rising sea levels and affecting coastal ecosystems. Freshwater bodies, such as rivers and lakes, are experiencing more frequent droughts, affecting water availability for communities and biodiversity. Moreover, ocean acidification, caused by increased carbon dioxide absorption, threatens marine ecosystems like coral reefs. Collaborative global efforts are needed to mitigate these impacts through sustainable water management practices.

== Types ==
This is a list of some common types of bodies of water. Some common geographical features involving water are not bodies of water in their own right, such as geysers, rapids, and waterfalls, and are therefore not included on this list. Some terms, particularly relating to wetlands, refer in part to one or more bodies of water and in part to the land surrounding them, and these have been included on this list.

Common types of bodies of water
Name	Description	Categorization				Regional association	Examples
Name	Description	Running	Inland	Ephemeral	Wetland	Regional association	Examples
Anabranch	A distributary that re-joins the branch it separated from further downstream.	Yes	Yes	No	No		the Great Darling Anabranch
Arm	An inlet; a narrow extension of a larger body of water.	Varies	Varies	No	No		Indian Arm
Arroyo	A bed of a steep-sided gully that temporarily fills with water after heavy rain.	Yes	Yes	Yes	No	the Southwestern United States	
Artificial lake	An artificially created lake.	No	Yes	No	No		Lake Burley Griffin
Backwater	A stagnant section of a river.	Varies	Yes	No	Varies		the Kerala backwaters
Barachois	A lagoon separated from the ocean by a sand bar.	No	No	No	No	Atlantic Canada, St. Pierre and Miquelon	Grand Barachois
Bay	A wide indentation of the coast of a larger body of water.	No	No	No	No		Bridgwater Bay
Bayou	A slow-moving marshy body of water.	Yes	Yes	No	Varies	the Gulf South of the United States, especially Louisiana	Bayou Teche
Bight	A large and wide indentation in the shoreline of a sea or ocean; a large bay or gulf.	No	No	No	No		the Bight of Benin
Billabong	An oxbow lake; a distributary leading to a dead-end or backwater; an ephemeral body of water formed after a dry creek bed floods.	No	Yes	Varies	No	Australia	Anbangbang Billabong
Bog	A wetland that accumulates peat.	No	Yes	No	Yes		Chat Moss
Bourne	An ephemeral chalk stream.	Yes	Yes	Yes	No	Southern England	
Broad	A river spreading out across lowlands; a shallow lake.	No	Yes	No	No	England, especially in the Broads region of Norfolk and Suffolk	Hickling Broad
Brook	A watercourse that is bigger than a stream but smaller than a river.	Yes	Yes	No	No		Moston Brook
Burn	A watercourse that is bigger than a stream but smaller than a river.	Yes	Yes	No	No	Scotland and North East England	the Usway Burn
Canal	An artificial waterway; a channel.	Varies	Varies	No	No		Stamford Canal
Cenote	A sinkhole with exposed groundwater at the bottom, formed as a result of the collapse of surface limestone.	No	Yes	No	No	Central America, especially the Yucatán Peninsula of Mexico	Sacred Cenote
Chalk stream	A watercourse fed by water emerging from an aquifer through bedrock made of chalk.	Yes	Yes	No	No	England	the River Pang
Channel	A navigable waterway between two bodies of water; a wide strait.	No	No	No	No		the Beagle Channel
Cove	A small indentation of the shoreline of a larger body of water; a small bay.	No	No	No	No		ANZAC Cove
Creek	A watercourse, usually smaller than or a distributary to a river.	Yes	Yes	No	No	Australia, Canada, New Zealand, the United States	Aliso Creek
Distributary	A stream or river that branches off from a larger watercourse.	Yes	Varies	No	No		the Waal
Ditch or dyke	An artificially created narrow trench used for irrigation and/or drainage.	Varies	Yes	No	No		the Grand Ditch
Endorheic lake	A lake that instead of having an outflow has its water level balanced entirely by evaporation and the inflow of water from its endorheic basin.	No	Yes	Varies	No		Lake Chad
Estuary	A partially enclosed area at the outflow of one or more rivers where river currents meet and mix with the tide.	No	No	No	No		Río de la Plata
Fen	A peat-forming wetland that relies on groundwater for inundation.	No	Yes	No	Yes		Wicken Fen
Firth	A narrow inlet on the coast of a sea.	No	No	No	No	Scotland	the Firth of Forth
Fjard or fiard	A broad and shallow inlet formed by withdrawing glaciers.	No	No	No	No	Sweden and Finland, mainly on the Baltic coast (Note: The English word fjard is derived from the Swedish word fjärd, but in Swedish the word fjärd has a much broader meaning than that of the English word, being used to also describe open areas of archipelagic waters (like Hårsfjärden) and lake-like sections of rivers (like Fjärnebofjärden).)	Vårbyfjärden
Fjord or fiord	A narrow and deep inlet formed by withdrawing glaciers.	No	No	No	No	The Nordic countries, especially Norway	Lysefjorden
Flood meadow or floodplain meadow	A seasonally flooded area of treeless grassland.	No	Yes	Yes	No		the Mottey Meadows
Gulf	A large extension of sea or ocean that stretches deep into the bordering landmass.	No	No	No	No		the Persian Gulf
Harbour	A coastal body of water that is partially enclosed, naturally or artificially, and where ships can be safely left.	No	No	No	No		Wellington Harbour
Hot spring	A naturally heated spring.	No	Yes	No	No		Sembawang Hot Spring Park
Inlet	A narrow indentation into the coastline of a larger body of water.	No	No	No	No		Bute Inlet
Kettle lake	A lake inside of a large rounded hole formed by glacial melt, a so-called kettle or pothole.	No	Yes	No	No		Kettle Mucubají
Kill	A stream, creek, river, or channel.	Varies	Varies	No	No	the United States, in New York, Pennsylvania and Delaware (Note: Primarily in areas that used to be part of the New Netherlands colony, as the origin of the term is Dutch.)	the West Kill
Lagoon or laguna	A shallow body of water that is partially or entirely separated from the sea by sandbanks, coral reef or similar features.	No	No	No	No		the Laguna Madre
Lake	A large inland body of water.	No	Yes	No	No		Ganoga Lake
Liman	A muddy lagoon.	No	No	No	No	the Black Sea	Tylihul Estuary
Loch or lough	A lake, inlet, arm of the sea or a bay that is almost enclosed by land.	No	No	No	No	Scotland, Ireland	Loch Ness
Mangrove forest or mangrove swamp	Saline or brackish coastal waters with mangroves growing in them.	No	Varies	No	Yes	the Tropics and the Subtropics	the Sundarbans
Marsh	A peat-forming wetland dominated by herbaceous plants.	No	Yes	No	Yes		Brandon Marsh
Mere	A lake or pond.	No	Yes	No	No	Great Britain	Cop Mere
Mire or peatland	A wetland where dead plant matter, known as peat, accumulates faster than it decays.	No	Yes	No	Yes	the Subarctic	
Moat	A deep, wide channel, dug around a point of interest and filled with water in order to protect it from attack.	No	Yes	No	No		Matsumoto Castle
Nullah	A river or stream, often intermittent, in a ravine; an inlet; a drain.	Yes	Yes	Yes	No	India, Pakistan, Hong Kong	Buddha Nullah
Oasis	An area in a desert where groundwater reaches the surface, creating a small fertile patch of land.	No	Yes	No	No	the Middle East and North Africa	Kharga Oasis
Ocean	One of the major bodies of salty water that together cover approximately 71% of the Earth's surface or all of them as one single body of water.	No	No	No	No		the Atlantic Ocean
Oxbow lake	A body of water formed by a bend in a river that is bypassed by a cutoff being wholly separated from the river as a result of sediment deposition.	No	Yes	Varies	No		the Kanwar Taal
Pool	A small body of water.	No	Yes	Varies	No		
Pond	A body of water, often artificial, that is smaller than a lake.	No	Yes	No	No		Brittas Pond
Puddle	A small, shallow pool of water.	No	Yes	Yes	No		
Reach	An open stretch of water.	Varies	Yes	No	No		Hanford Reach
Reservoir	A lake or pond, often artificially created by a dam or other impoundment, that is used as a water storage.	No	Yes	No	No		Abberton Reservoir
Ria	An inlet formed by a rise in sea levels submerging a valley carved by a river.	No	No	No	No	China, Spain, especially in Galicia, Asturias, and the Basque Country China	Ria de Pontevedra
Rill or rivulet	A very small watercourse.	Yes	Yes	Varies	No		
River	A large, natural stream of freshwater.	Yes	Yes	No	No		the Colorado River
Roadstead or roads	A sheltered area of water near a shore that is less enclosed by land than a harbour and where ships may anchor.	No	No	No	No		Hampton Roads
Run	A small stream, especially a swift one.	Yes	Yes	No	No		Scotch Run
Salt marsh	A wetland near the coast that gets flooded and drained by the tides of a nearby body of saltwater.	No	Yes	No	Yes		the Rann of Kutch
Sea	A large body of water, usually saline and connected to the oceans.	No	No	No	No		the Adriatic Sea
Seep	A small spring.	No	Yes	No	No		
Slough	A wetland, often near an inlet or backwater.	No	Yes	No	Yes		the Columbia Slough
Sound	A long inlet; a channel connecting two large bodies of water or separating an island from the mainland.	No	No	No	No		Nootka Sound
Spring	A place where water emerges from the ground.	No	Yes	No	No		Eye of Kuruman
Strait	A narrow passage of water connecting two large bodies of water.	No	No	No	No		Foveaux Strait
Stream	A watercourse that is usually smaller than a river; a running body of water.	Yes	Yes	No	No		the Waiwhetū Stream
Subglacial lake	A lake that is permanently covered by ice and whose water remains liquid by the pressure of the ice sheet and geothermal heating.	No	Yes	No	No	Antarctica	Lake Vostok
Subterranean river	A river that runs underground.	Yes	Yes	No	No		the Puerto Princesa Subterranean River
Swamp	A wetland with many trees and shrubs.	No	Yes	No	Yes		Zapata Swamp
Tarn	A mountain lake formed in a cirque.	No	Yes	No	No		Malham Tarn
Tidal creek (Note: Often simply referred to as a "creek" in the British Isles.) or tidal channel	A long, narrow and shallow inlet or estuary whose water level is noticeably affected by the tides.	No	No	Varies	No		Te Wai-o-Pareira / Henderson Creek
Tide pool	A pool of seawater trapped in a rocky depression as the tide recedes from an area that is submerged at high tide.	No	No	No	No		the Flat Point Tide Pools
Tributary or affluent	A watercourse that flows into a larger stream or river.	Yes	Yes	No	No		the Willamette River
Vernal pool	An ephemeral wetland that forms seasonally by precipitation filling natural depressions in level ground, that flood seasonally to form wetland environments.	No	Yes	Yes	Yes		the Phoenix Vernal Pools
Wadi	A stream or river that only runs after heavy rain, usually only occurring during the rainy season.	Yes	Yes	Yes	No	North Africa and Arabia	Wadi Doan
Washland or washes	A area that is periodically flooded by a nearby stream or river, especially one that is allowed to do so for flood management or water storage purposes.	No	Yes	No	Varies		Ouse Washes
Watercourse	A running body of water.	Yes	Yes	Varies	No		
Watering hole or waterhole	A natural depression where animals can drink accumulated water.	No	Yes	Varies	No		
Well	A hole, usually man-made, with exposed groundwater at the bottom.	No	Yes	Varies	No		the Etruscan Well
Wetland	An area of land that is inundated by water.	No	Yes	No	Yes		the Bangweulu Wetlands
Winterbourne	An ephemeral stream that mostly, or only, flows during winter.	Yes	Yes	Yes	No	Southern England	the River Lavant

== Gallery ==
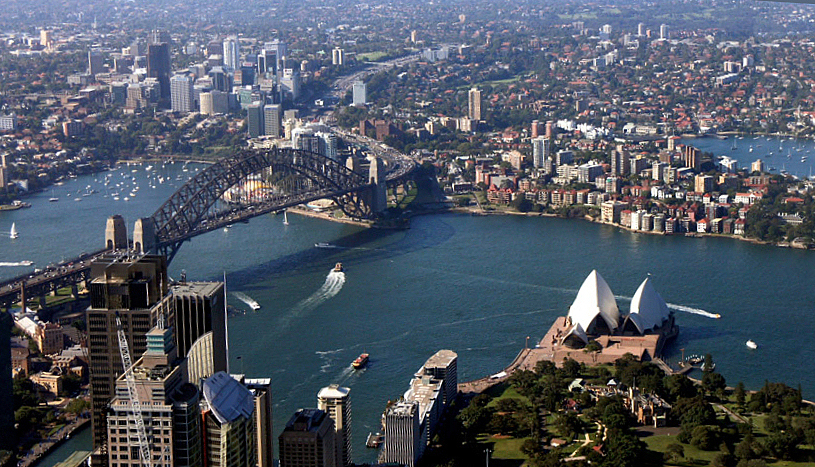
Port Jackson, Sydney, New South Wales

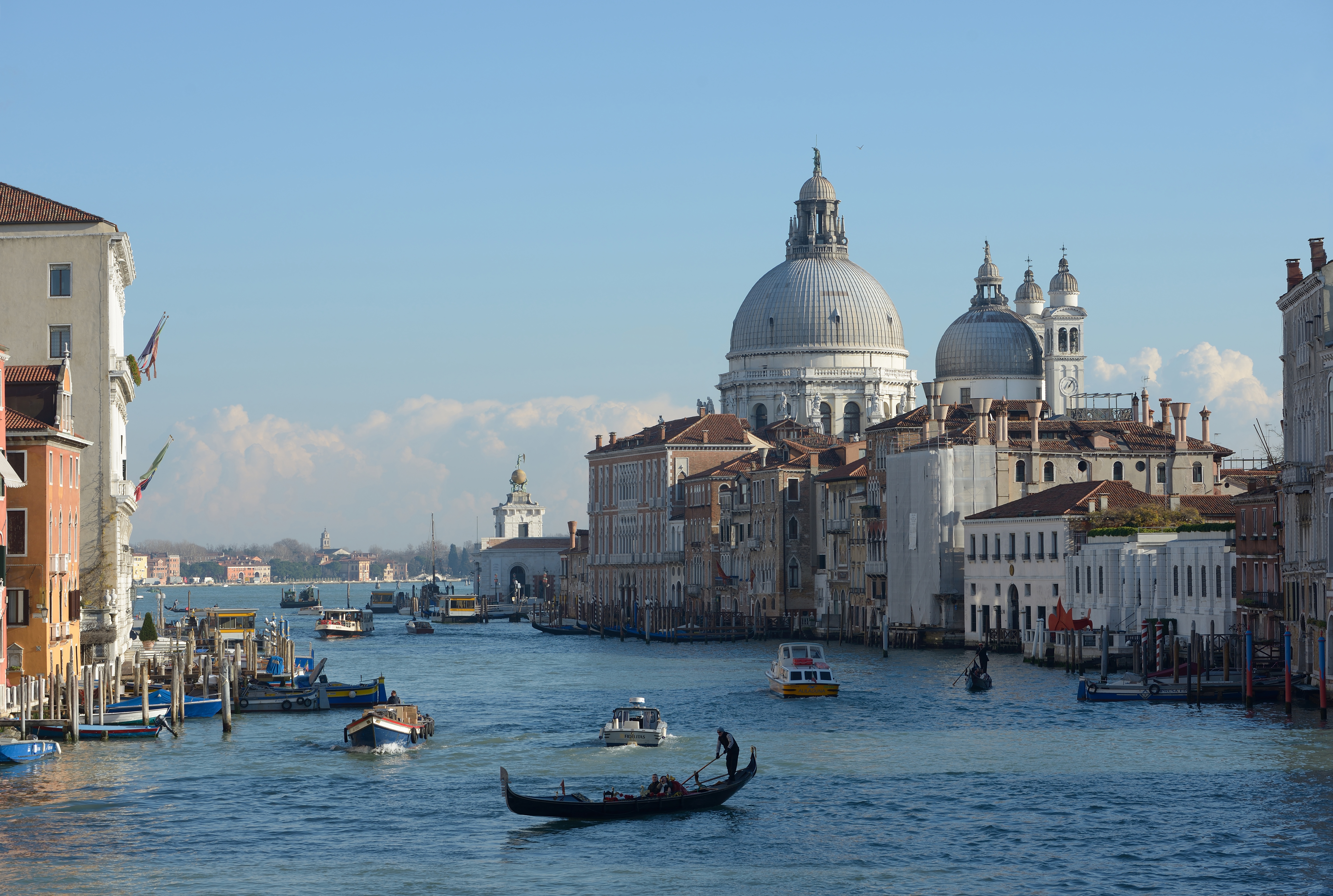
The Canal Grande in Venice, one of the major water-traffic corridors in the city. View from the Accademia bridge.

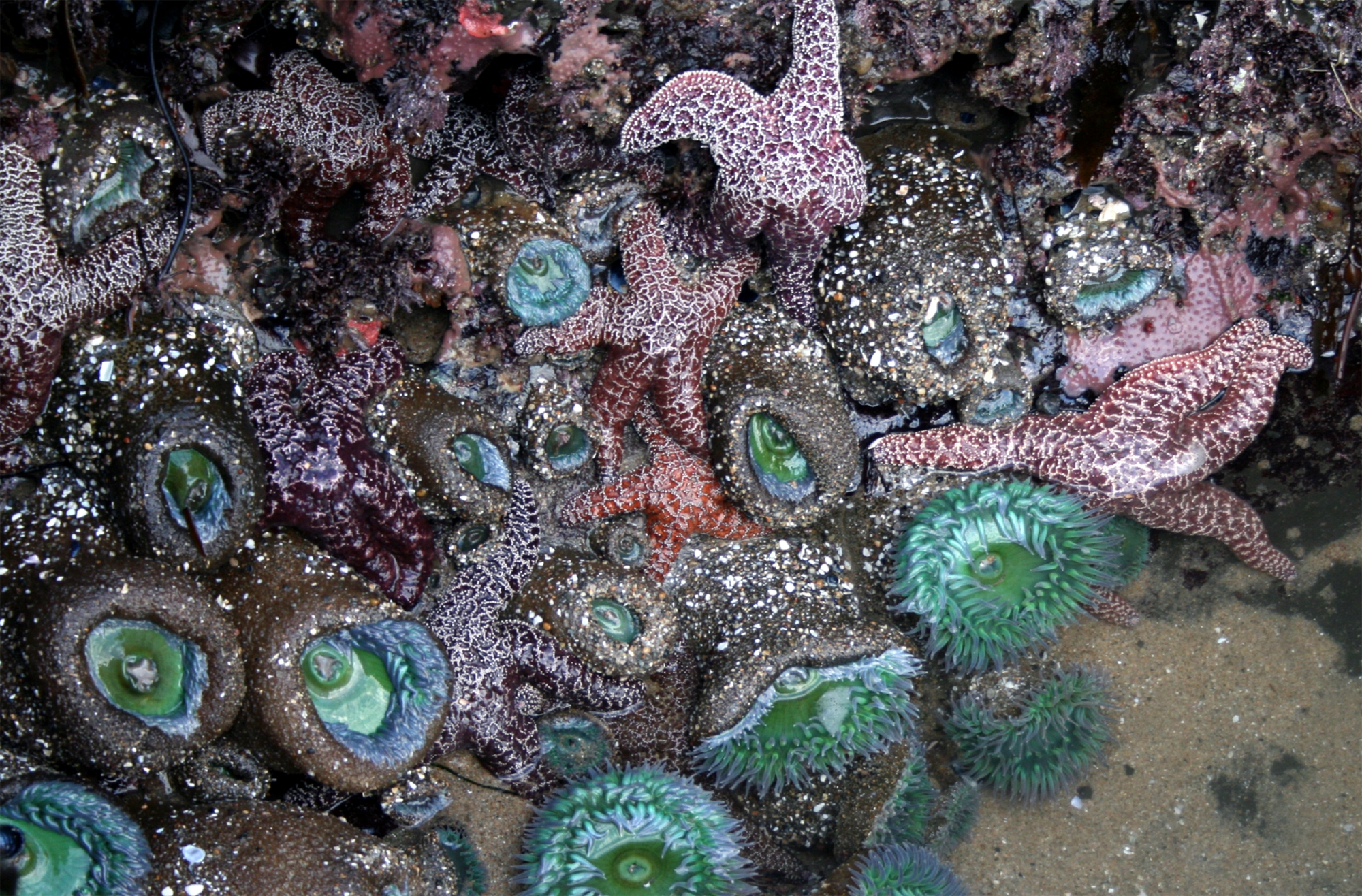
A tide pool in Santa Cruz, California with sea anemones and sea stars

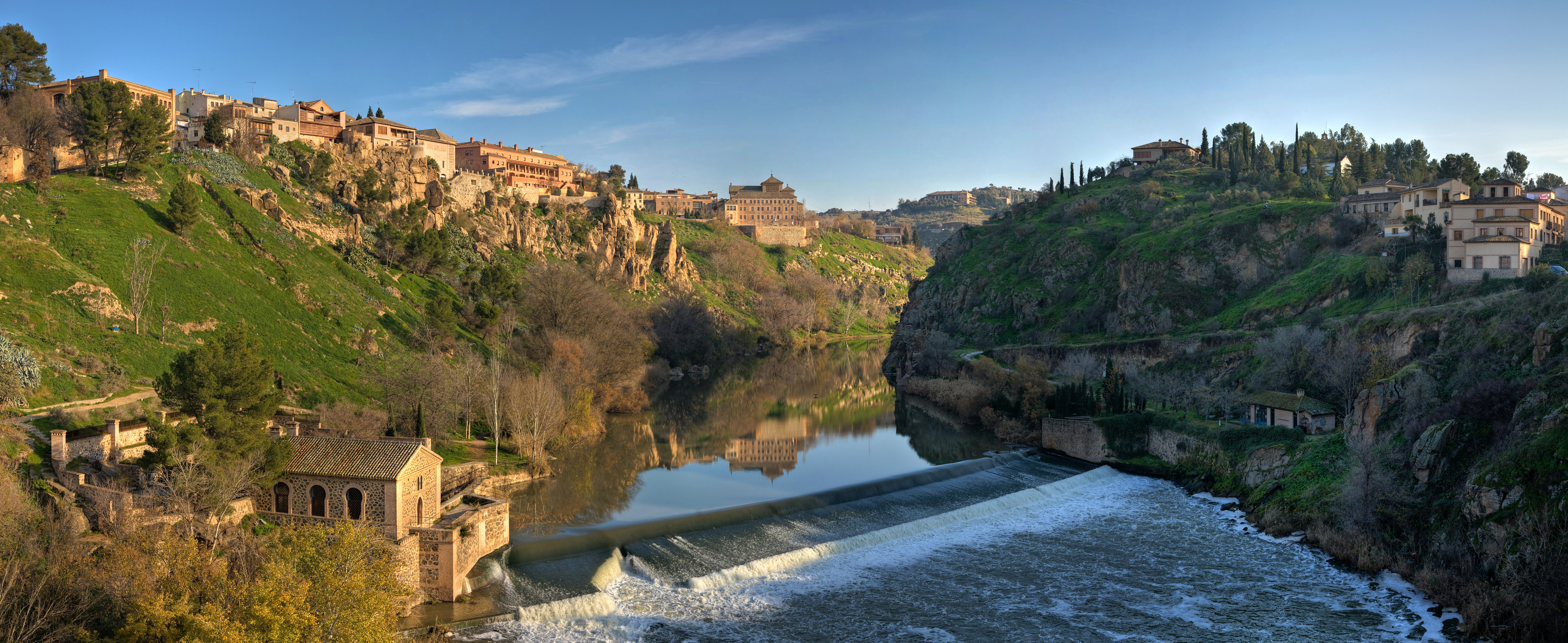
A weir in Toledo, Spain. Weirs are frequently used to change the height of a riverlevel, prevent floodings, and measure water discharge.

== See also ==
- Bank (geography) – Land alongside a body of water
- Bog – Type of wetland with peat-rich soil
- Fluvial processes – Sediment processes associated with rivers and streams
- Glossary of landforms
- Lists of bodies of water – Overview of various waterbodies
- Port – Maritime facility where ships may dock to load and discharge passengers and cargo
- Water mass – Body of water with common formation history
- Water pollution – Contamination of water bodies
