= Lohrbach (Aubach) =

River in Germany

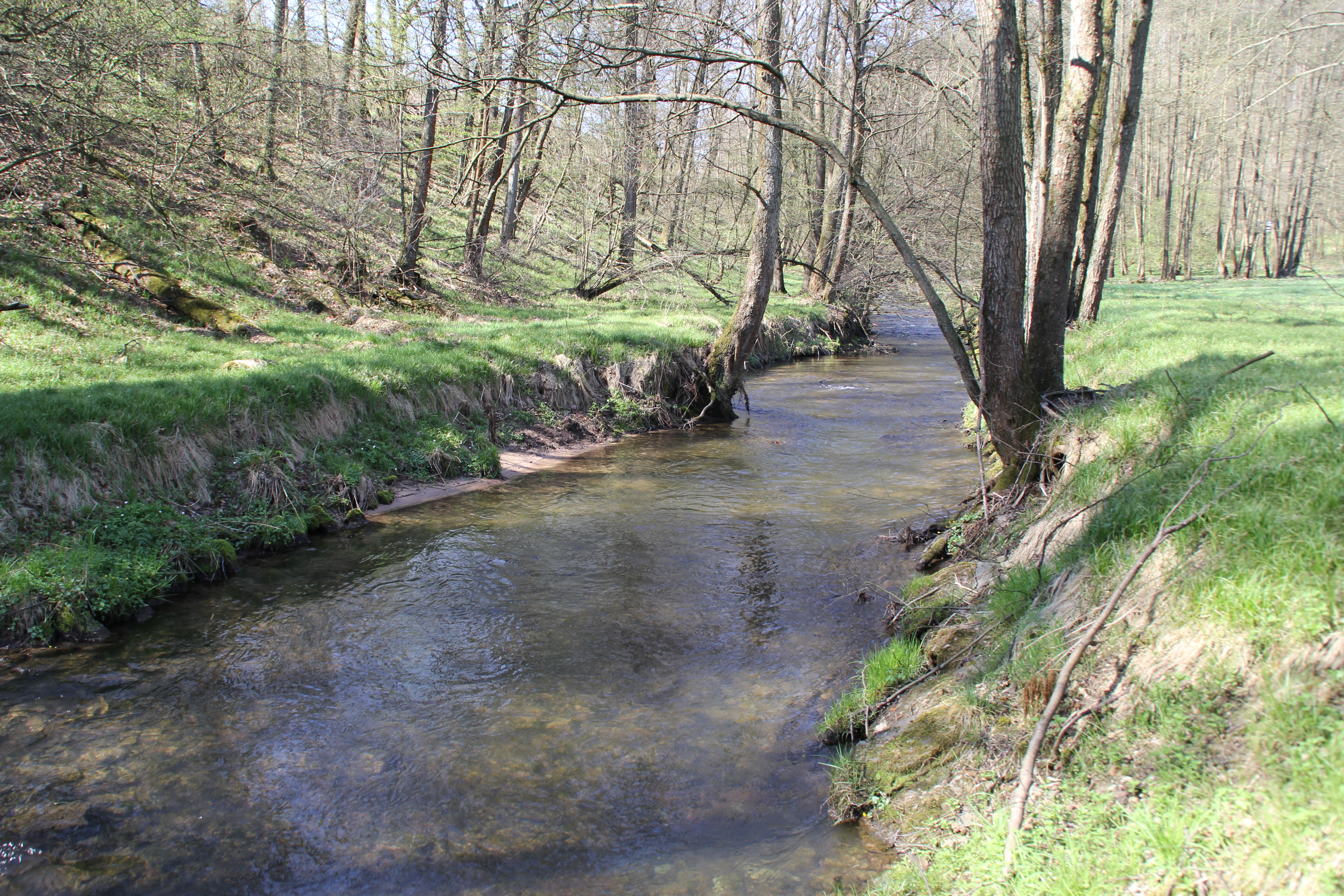
- The Lohrbach at Neuhütten

Location
- Country: Germany
- State: Bavaria

Physical characteristics
- Mouth
  - location: Aubach
  - coordinates: 50.0180°N 9.4405°E
- Length: 13.9 km (8.6 mi)

Basin features
- Progression: Aubach→ Lohr→ Main→ Rhine→ North Sea

Lohrbach is a river of Bavaria, Germany. It is a right tributary of the Aubach near Wiesthal.

== See also ==
- List of rivers of Bavaria
