= Wiesbüttgraben =

River in Germany

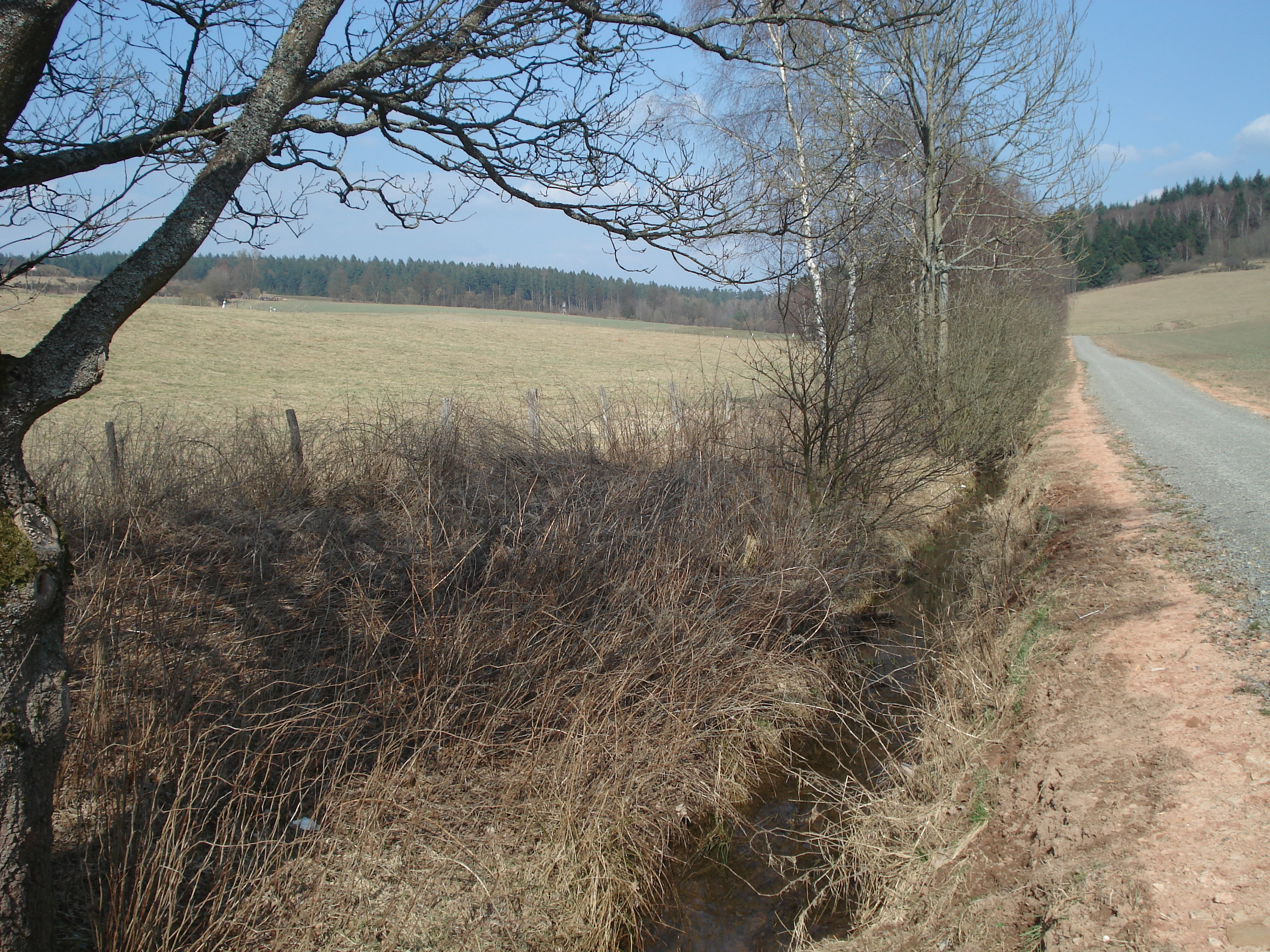
- The Wiesbüttgraben before Wiesen

Location
- Country: Germany
- State: Bavaria

Physical characteristics
- Mouth
  - location: Aubach
  - coordinates: 50°06′50″N 9°21′50″E

Basin features
- Progression: Aubach→ Lohr→ Main→ Rhine→ North Sea

Wiesbüttgraben is a small river of Bavaria, Germany.

Its spring is an outflow of the lake Wiesbüttsee. It is a tributary of the Aubach in Wiesen.

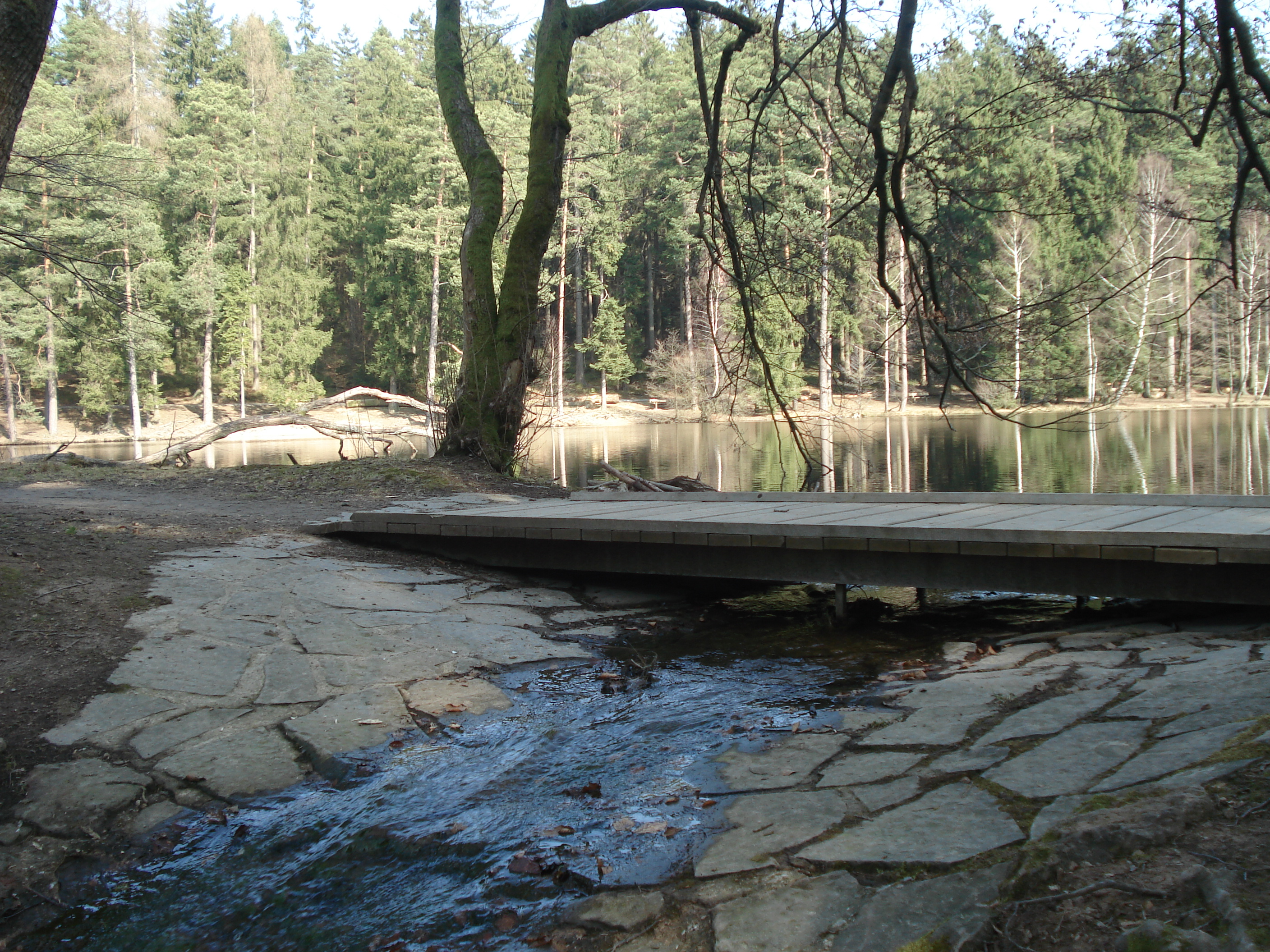
The Wiesbüttgraben flowing out of the lake Wiesbüttsee

Another image of the outflow

== See also ==
- List of rivers of Bavaria
