= Ciral (disambiguation) =

Ciral or CIRAL may refer to:

- Ciral, commune in the Orne department in France
- CIRAL, the EPPO code of Cirsium altissimum
- Centre interdisciplinaire de recherches sur les activités langagières, developers of the Trésor de la langue française au Québec in Canada
