= Neuhütten =

- Municipality
- Coat of arms

- Location of Neuhütten within Main-Spessart district
- Interactive map of Neuhütten
- Location within Germany Location within Bavaria
- Coordinates: 50°0′N 9°25′E
- Country: Germany
- State: Bavaria
- Admin. region: Unterfranken
- District: Main-Spessart
- Municipal assoc.: Partenstein

Government
  - Mayor (2020–26): Bernd Steigerwald

Area
  - Total: 5.95 km^{2} (2.30 sq mi)
- Elevation: 270 m (890 ft)

Population (2025-12-31)
  - Total: 1,105
  - Density: 186/km^{2} (481/sq mi)
- Time zone: UTC+01:00 (CET)
  - Summer (DST): UTC+02:00 (CEST)
- Postal codes: 97843
- Dialling codes: 06020
- Vehicle registration: MSP
- Website: www.neuhuetten.de

Neuhütten (German pronunciation: [nɔʏˈhʏtn̩]) is a municipality in the Main-Spessart district in the Regierungsbezirk of Lower Franconia (Unterfranken) in Bavaria, Germany and a member of the Verwaltungsgemeinschaft (municipal association) of Partenstein. It has a population of around 1,100.

== Geography ==
=== Location ===
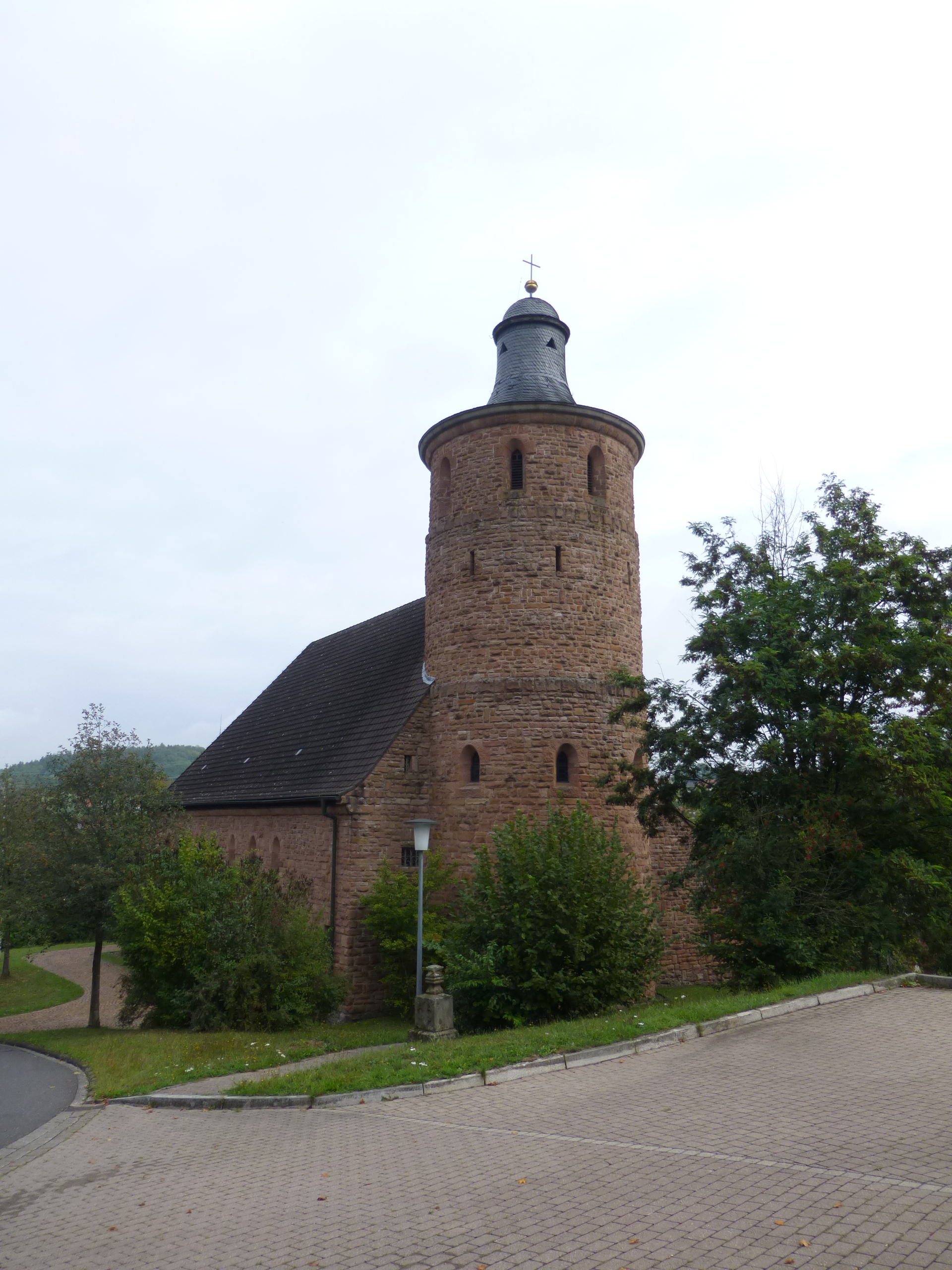
The fortified tower of the church.

Neuhütten lies in the Main-Spessart district in the Würzburg region. I is located in the Mittelgebirge Spessart. The municipal territory mostly lies in the valley of Grimmenwiesenbach a tributary of the Lohrbach but stretches into the valley of the Lohrbach river itself, which passes to the north. The highest elevation of the municipality is to the southeast, on the slopes of Hengstkopf.

== Subdivision ==
The community has two Gemarkungen (traditional rural cadastral area): Neuhütten and Forst Lohrer Strasse. The former contains the Ortsteil Neuhütten (Dorf). The latter consists of three exclaves: Bischborner Hof, Lohrerstrasse and Birkig. These lie on the Bundesstrasse 26 and are surrounded by the unincorporated area Forst Lohrerstrasse.

== Neighbouring communities ==
The municipal territory borders on (from the north, clockwise): Wiesthal, Partensteiner Forst, Forst Lohrerstrasse, Rothenbucher Forst, Forst Hain im Spessart (all four wooded unincorporated areas), Heigenbrücken and Heinrichsthaler Forst (another wooded unincorporated area).

== History ==
In 1349, Neuhütten had its first documentary mention in a Mainz document as one of the glass works in the Spessart. Only in 1513 was Neuhütten used for the first time as a place-name. As part of the Archbishopric of Mainz, Neuhütten passed with the 1803 Reichsdeputationshauptschluss to Prince Primate von Dalberg's newly formed Principality of Aschaffenburg, with which it passed in 1814 (by this time it had become a department of the Grand Duchy of Frankfurt) to the Kingdom of Bavaria. In the course of administrative reform in Bavaria, the current community came into being with the Gemeindeedikt (“Municipal Edict”) of 1818.

== Demographics ==
Within town limits, 1,023 inhabitants were counted in 1970, 1,092 in 1987 and in 2000 1,271.

== Economy ==
According to official statistics, there were 104 workers on the social welfare contribution rolls working in producing businesses in 1998. In trade and transport this was 0. In other areas, 463 such workers worked from home. There was 1 processing business. One business was in construction, and furthermore, in 1999, there were 11 agricultural operations with a working area of 342 ha, of which 339 ha was meadowland.

Municipal taxes in 1999 amounted to €481,000 (converted), of which net business taxes amounted to €18,000.

== Governance ==
The mayor is Bernd Steigerwald, elected in 2020.

=== Coat of arms ===
The community's arms might be described thus: Gules in chief three hexagonal prisms pointed at each end palewise in fess, in base a wheel spoked of six argent.

Neuhütten belonged until 1803 to the Archbishopric of Mainz, to which the wheel (Wheel of Mainz) refers. The name Neuhütten itself refers to the glass works – Hütte can mean a mill of some kind in German – named in written sources as early as 1477. It is these to which the three glass prisms (not quartz crystals, apparently, their shape notwithstanding) refer.

The arms were approved by the Government of Lower Franconia and have been borne since 2 September 1976.

== Infrastructure ==
=== Transport ===
The Main-Spessart railway passes through the municipal territory in the Lohrbach valley. The closest stop is at Wiesthal. Parallel to the railway runs State Road 2317. District Road MSP21 connects to Bundesstrasse 26.

== Education ==
In 1999, Neuhütten had one Kindergarten with 50 children.
