= Electronic publishing =

Publishing and disseminating documents via electronic means

Electronic publishing, also known as e-publishing, digital publishing, or online publishing, includes the digital publication of e-books, digital magazines, and the development of digital libraries and catalogues. It also includes the editing of books, journals, and magazines for reading on a screen (computer, e-reader, tablet, or smartphone).

== Overview ==
Electronic publishing has become common in scientific publishing, where it has been argued that peer-reviewed scientific journals are in the process of being replaced by electronic publishing. It is also becoming common to distribute books, magazines, and newspapers to consumers through tablet reading devices, a market that is growing by millions each year, generated by online vendors such as Apple's iTunes bookstore, Amazon's bookstore for Kindle, and books in the Google Play Bookstore. Market research suggested that half of all magazine and newspaper circulation would be via digital delivery by the end of 2015 and that half of all reading in the United States would be done without paper by 2015.

Although distribution via the Internet (also known as online publishing or web publishing when in the form of a website) is nowadays strongly associated with electronic publishing, there are many non-network electronic publications such as encyclopedias on CD and DVD, as well as technical and reference publications relied on by mobile users and others without reliable and high-speed access to a network. Electronic publishing is also being used in the field of test-preparation as well as in developing economies for student education (thus partly replacing conventional books), for it enables content and analytics combined for the benefit of students. The use of electronic publishing for textbooks may become more prevalent with Apple Books and Apple's negotiation with the three largest textbook suppliers in the U.S.

Electronic publishing is increasingly popular in works of fiction. Since the companies do not have to order printed books and have them delivered, electronic publishers are able to respond quickly to the changing market demand. E-publishing is also making a wider range of books accessible, including books that customers would not find in standard book retailers due to insufficient demand for a traditional print run. E-publication is enabling new authors to release books that would be unlikely to be profitable for traditional publishers.

While the term electronic publishing is primarily used in the 2010s to refer to online and web-based publishers, the term has a history of being used to describe the development of new forms of production, distribution, and user interaction in regard to computer-based production of text and other interactive media.

== History ==
=== Digitization ===
The first digitization initiative was in 1971 by Michael S. Hart, a student at the University of Illinois at Chicago, who launched Project Gutenberg, designed to make literature more accessible to everyone through the internet. It took a while to develop, and in 1989 there were only 10 texts that were manually recopied on computer by Hart himself and some volunteers. But with the appearance of the Web 1.0 in 1991 and its ability to connect documents together through static pages, the project quickly moved forward. Many more volunteers helped in developing the project by giving access to public domain classics.

In the 1970s, the French National Centre for Scientific Research digitized a thousand books from diverse subjects, mostly literature but also philosophy and science, dating from to the 12th century to present times. In this way the foundations of a large dictionary known as the Trésor de la langue française au Québec were built. This foundation of e-texts, named Frantext, was published on a compact disc under the brand name Discotext, and then on the World Wide Web in 1998.

=== Mass-scale digitization ===
In 1974, American inventor Raymond Kurzweil founded Kurzweil Computer Products and developed an omni-font OCR system (i.e., software able to recognise printed text in a wide variety of fonts) which, together with a scanner and a text-to-speech synthesizer, transformed print into spoken word. The digitization projects could then be more ambitious since the time needed for digitization decreased considerably, and digital libraries were on the rise.

During the late 1990s and early 2000s, digital libraries began to appear globally as universities, governments, and cultural institutions digitized their collections and made them accessible online.

The ABU (Association des Bibliophiles Universels), was a public digital library project created by the Cnam in 1993. It was the first French digital library in the network; closed in 2002, they reproduced over a hundred texts which are still available.

In 1992, the Bibliothèque nationale de France launched a vast digitization program. The president François Mitterrand had wanted since 1988 to create a new and innovative digital library, and it was published in 1997 under the name of Gallica. In 2014, the digital library was offering 80 255 online books and over a million documents, including prints and manuscripts.

In 2003, Wikisource was launched, and the project aspired to constitute a digital and multilingual library that would be a complement to the Wikipedia project. It was originally named "Project Sourceberg", as a play on words reminiscent of Project Gutenberg. Supported by the Wikimedia Foundation, Wikisource proposes digitized texts that have been verified by volunteers.

In December 2004, Google created Google Books, a project to digitize all the books available in the world (over 130 million books) to make them accessible online. As of 2014, 25,000,000 books, from a hundred countries and in 400 languages, are on the platform. This was possible because by that time, robotic scanners could digitize around 6,000 books per hour.

In 2008, the prototype of Europeana was launched; and by 2010, the project had been giving access to over 10 million digital objects. The Europeana library is a European catalog that offers index cards on millions of digital objects and links to their digital libraries. The same year, HathiTrust was created to put together the contents of many university e-libraries from the USA and Europe, as well as Google Books and Internet Archive. In 2016, over six million users had used HathiTrust.

=== Electronic publishing ===
The first digitization projects involved transferring physical content into digital content. Electronic publishing aims to integrate the whole process of editing and publishing (production, layout, publication) in the digital world.

Alain Mille, in the book Pratiques de l'édition numérique (edited by Michael E. Sinatra and Marcello Vitali-Rosati), says that the beginnings of the Internet and the Web are at the very core of electronic publishing, since they essentially determined the largest changes in patterns of production and dissemination: "The Internet also has a direct impact on publishing, allowing creators and users to move beyond the traditional production process (author–editor–publisher)."

Traditional publishing, and especially the creation aspect, was first revolutionized by new desktop publishing software in the 1980s, and by the text databases created for encyclopedias and directories. At the same time, multimedia was developing quickly, combining the characteristics of books, audiovisual media and computer science. CDs and DVDs appeared, permitting the visualization of these dictionaries and encyclopedias on computers.

The arrival and democratization of the Internet has slowly given small publishing houses the opportunity to publish their books directly online. Some websites, like Amazon, let their users buy eBooks; Internet users can also find many educational platforms (both free and paid), encyclopedic websites like Wikipedia, as well as digital magazine platforms. eBooks then become more accessible through many different devices, like the e-reader and smartphones. The digital book had, and still has, an important impact on publishing houses and their economic models; it is still in flux, and has yet to master new ways of publishing in a digital era.

=== Participatory Web ===
Based on new forms of communication in Web 2.0, the Internet opens the door to community collaboration in order to elaborate and improve Internet content while also enriching reading through collective reading practices. Web 2.0 not only links documents together, as did Web 1.0; it also links people together through social media, hence the term participative (or participatory) Web.

Many tools have been put in place to foster the sharing and creation of collective content. One of many is Wikipedia, since it is edited, corrected and enhanced by millions of contributors. OpenStreetMap is also based on the same principle. Blogs and comment systems are also part of such community participation, as they facilitate interactions between an author and their readers, and can be an important source of inspiration and also visibility.

== Process ==
The electronic publishing process follows some aspects of the traditional paper-based publishing process but differs from traditional publishing in two ways: 1) it does not include using an offset printing press to print the final product and 2) it avoids the distribution of a physical product (e.g., paper books, paper magazines, or paper newspapers). Because the content is electronic, it may be distributed over the Internet and through electronic bookstores, and users can read the material on a range of electronic and digital devices, including desktop computers, laptops, tablet computers, smartphones or e-reader tablets. The consumer may read the published content online on a website, in an application on a tablet device, or in a PDF document on a computer. In some cases, the reader may print the content onto paper using a consumer-grade ink-jet or laser printer or via a print-on-demand system. Some users download digital content to their devices, enabling them to read the content even when their device is not connected to the Internet (e.g., on an airplane flight).

Distributing content electronically as software applications ("apps") has become popular in the 2010s, due to the rapid consumer adoption of smartphones and tablets. At first, native apps for each mobile platform were required to reach all audiences, but in an effort toward universal device compatibility, attention has turned to using HTML5 to create web apps that can run on any browser and function on many devices. The benefit of electronic publishing comes from using three attributes of digital technology: XML tags to define content, style sheets to define the look of content, and metadata (data about data) to describe the content for search engines, thus helping users to find and locate the content (a common example of metadata is the information about a song's songwriter, composer, genre that is electronically encoded along with most CDs and digital audio files; this metadata makes it easier for music lovers to find the songs they are looking for). With the use of tags, style sheets, and metadata, this enables reflowable content that adapts to various reading devices (tablet, smartphone, e-reader, etc.) or electronic delivery methods.

Because electronic publishing often requires text mark-up (e.g., HyperText Markup Language or some other markup language) to develop online delivery methods, the traditional roles of typesetters and book designers, who created the printing set-ups for paper books, have changed. Designers of digitally published content must have a strong knowledge of mark-up languages, the variety of reading devices and computers available, and the ways in which consumers read, view or access the content. However, in the 2010s, new user-friendly design software is becoming available for designers to publish content in this standard without needing to know detailed programming techniques, such as Adobe Systems' Digital Publishing Suite and Apple's iBooks Author. The most common file format is .epub, used in many e-book formats. .epub is a free and open standard available in many publishing programs. Another common format is .folio, which is used by the Adobe Digital Publishing Suite to create content for Apple's iPad tablets and apps.

== Business models ==
- Digital distribution
- Online advertising
- Open access (publishing)
- Pay-per-view
- Print on demand
- Self-publishing
- Subscriptions
- Non-subsidy publishing

== See also ==
- Desktop publishing – Page layout using a personal computer
- Electronic literature – Literary works created for digital devices
- Electronic typesetting – Composition of text using computer fonts
- Mobile publishing – Web content used on a mobile phone
- Single-Source-Publishing - Creating multiple media formats out of one source
- Ebook – Book published in digital form
