= Partenstein (Verwaltungsgemeinschaft) =

- Verwaltungsgemeinschaft
- Location of Partenstein within Main-Spessart district
- Interactive map of Partenstein
- Location within Germany Location within Bavaria
- Coordinates: 50°02′N 9°31′E
- Country: Germany
- State: Bavaria
- Admin. region: Lower Franconia
- District: Main-Spessart
- Seat: Partenstein
- Subdivisions: 3 municipalities

Area
  - Total: 25.64 km^{2} (9.90 sq mi)

Population (2025-12-31)
  - Total: 4,999
  - Density: 195.0/km^{2} (505.0/sq mi)
- Time zone: UTC+01:00 (CET)
  - Summer (DST): UTC+02:00 (CEST)

Partenstein is a Verwaltungsgemeinschaft (municipal association) in the district Main-Spessart in Bavaria, Germany. Its seat is in Partenstein.

It consists of the following municipalities:

1. Neuhütten
2. Partenstein
3. Wiesthal
