= Grand Barachois, Miquelon Island =

Lagoon in Saint Pierre and Miquelon

Grand Barachois
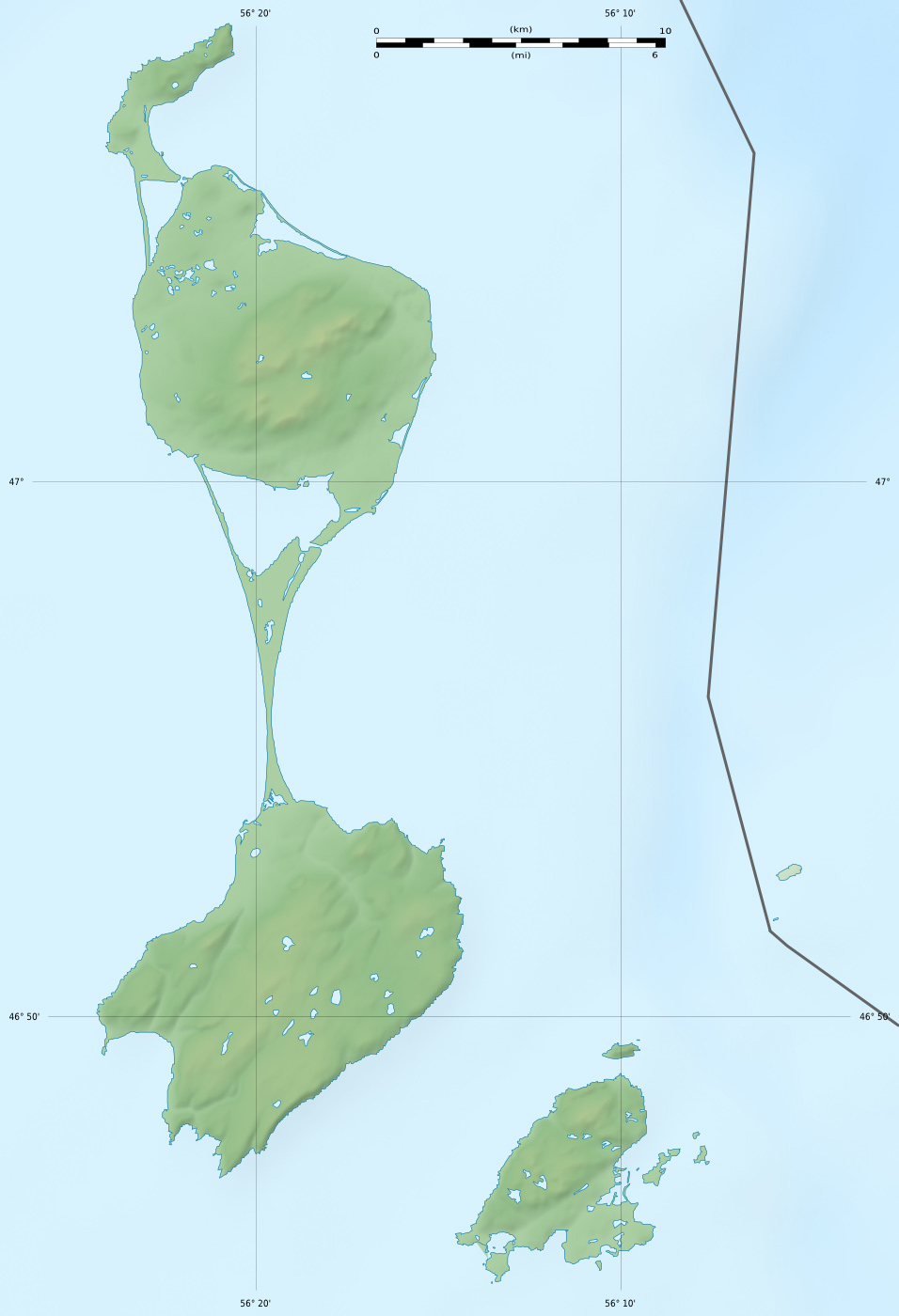
- Location: Miquelon Island
- Coordinates: 46°59′20″N 56°19′20″W
- Type: Barachois

Grand Barachois (French pronunciation: [ɡʁɑ̃ baʁaʃwa]) is a large, triangular-shaped barachois, or lagoon, in Saint Pierre and Miquelon. It lies at the southern end of Miquelon Island, is bounded by the island and the 12 kilometre-long (7.5 mi) tombolo La Dune, and is connected to the sea by the Goulet de Langlade channel.

== Geography ==
The Grand Barachois is triangular in shape, and has a perimeter of approximately 13 kilometres (8.1 mi), bounded by Miquelon Island to the north and northeast and the 12 kilometre-long (7.5 mi) tombolo La Dune, which forms the connection between Miquelon Island and Langlade Island, to the west, south and southeast; the northeast and southeast are divided by the Goulet de Langlade, a channel connecting the lagoon to the sea. The lagoon is shallow, leading to many sand flats being exposed during low tide.

== History ==
The fishermen of Saint Pierre and Miquelon used to enter the Grand Barachois to stock up on cod bait and, according to Edgar Aubert de la Rüe, after La Dune became an isthmus between Miquelon Island and Langlade Island likely also for shelter, but, unlike the larger lagoon on the northwest part of the island, the shallow waters of the Grand Barachois combined with the narrow entry point prevented larger vessels from safely entering the lagoon.

== Ecology ==
The lagoon acts as a summer breeding ground for harbour seals, and is also visited by grey seals, with both populations using the lagoon's sand flats as a place to idle, before either being washed off the sand flats by high tide or voluntarily leaving them after sunset in order to exit the lagoon to feed. The seals are protected from hunting by French law.

Leading up to 2019, algal blooms had been spotted in the been spotted in the Grand Barachois, prompting concerns over the possibility that they may be a consequence of the lagoon filling up with sediment and the potential threat to the local environment that could pose. A survey to investigate this possibility was carried out by the Bureau de Recherches Géologiques et Minières in 2019 found that the changes, rather than being due to the lagoon filling with sediment, were a result of the spread of eelgrass towards the shores of the lagoon.
