= Barachois =

Coastal lagoon partially or totally separated from the ocean by a sand or shingle bar

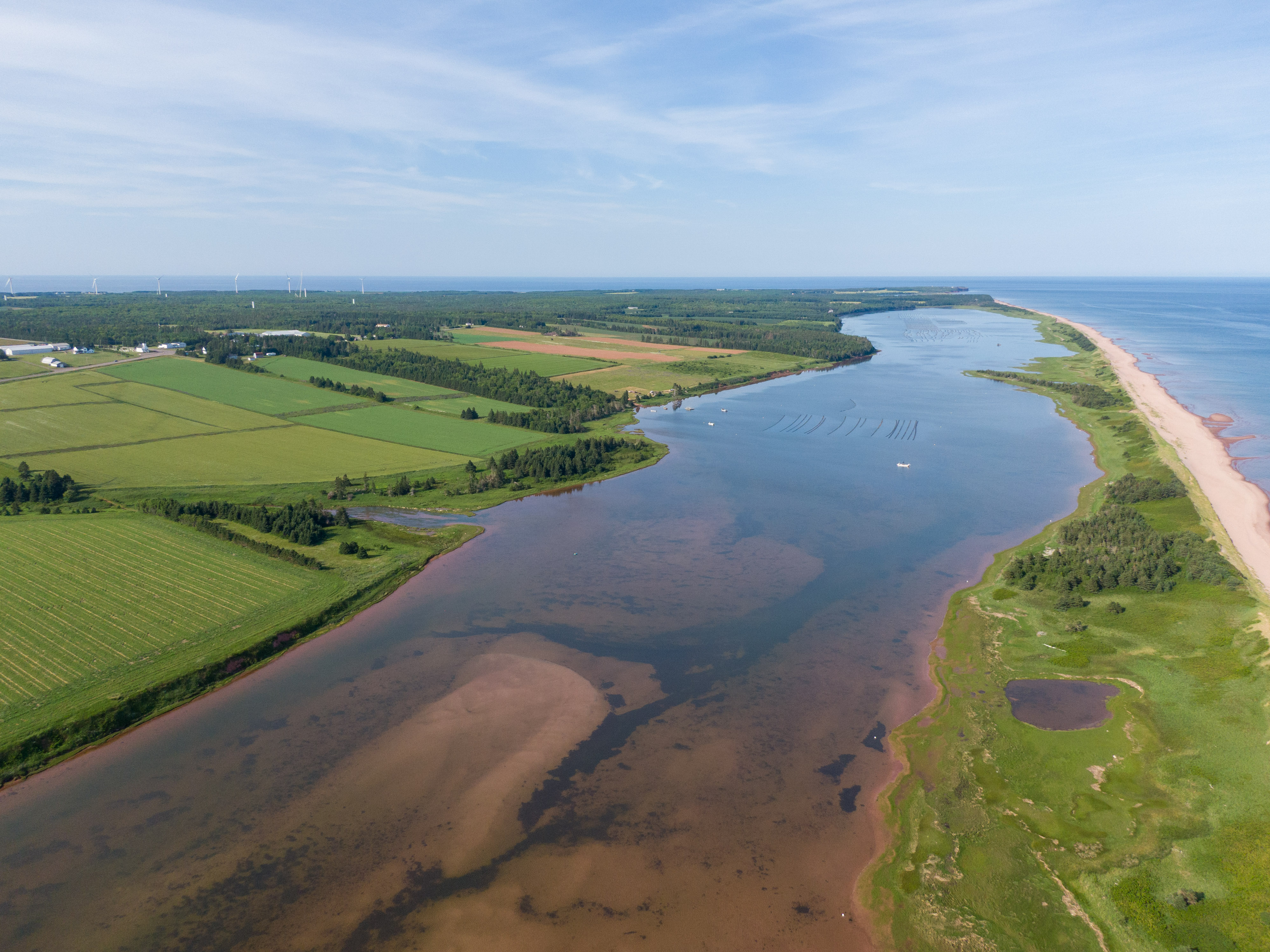
A barachois at South Lake, Prince Edward Island.

A barachois is a type of coastal lagoon partially or totally separated from the ocean by a sand or shingle bar. The term is used in Atlantic Canada, Saint Pierre and Miquelon, Réunion, and Mauritius. On Diego Garcia in the British Indian Ocean Territory, it describes narrow-mouthed saltwater wetlands within the lagoon.

In some cases, the separating bar is composed of boulders rather than sand, such as at Freshwater Bay near St. John’s, Newfoundland. Salt water may enter a barachois during high tides.

Barachois features often form as a result of sediment deposition in the delta of a river or, in some locations such as Miquelon Island, by a tombolo.

== Name ==
Despite its French form, the term barachois did not enter Canadian usage with the earliest French explorers. Writers such as Samuel de Champlain and Jacques Cartier instead used expressions such as havre de barre (or hable de barre), meaning a natural harbour protected by a sandbar.

Several hypotheses have been proposed to explain the origin of barachois. A widely circulated folk etymology derives it from the French phrase barre à choir; this and similar explanations have been rejected by linguists. According to the Trésor de la langue française au Québec, the term is instead of Basque origin, derived from barratxoa, meaning “small bar”. The word was adopted into French through contact with Basque fishermen active in the Gulf of St. Lawrence from the 16th century onward, and later spread to other French-speaking regions.

In Newfoundland English, the term has developed local pronunciations such as barshwa and, more commonly, “barasway”.

== Selected examples ==
- Dark Harbour, Grand Manan, New Brunswick
- Barachois de Malbaie, Gaspé Peninsula, Quebec
- Grand Barachois, Miquelon Island
- Grand-Barachois, Westmorland County, New Brunswick
- Barachois Pond Provincial Park, western Newfoundland and Labrador
- Big Barasway and Little Barasway, communities on Newfoundland’s Cape Shore
- Several examples within Prince Edward Island National Park
- Percival Bay (the “Big Barachois”), off the Northumberland Strait
- Great Barachois, near Petit-de-Grat, Nova Scotia
