= Partenstein =

- Municipality
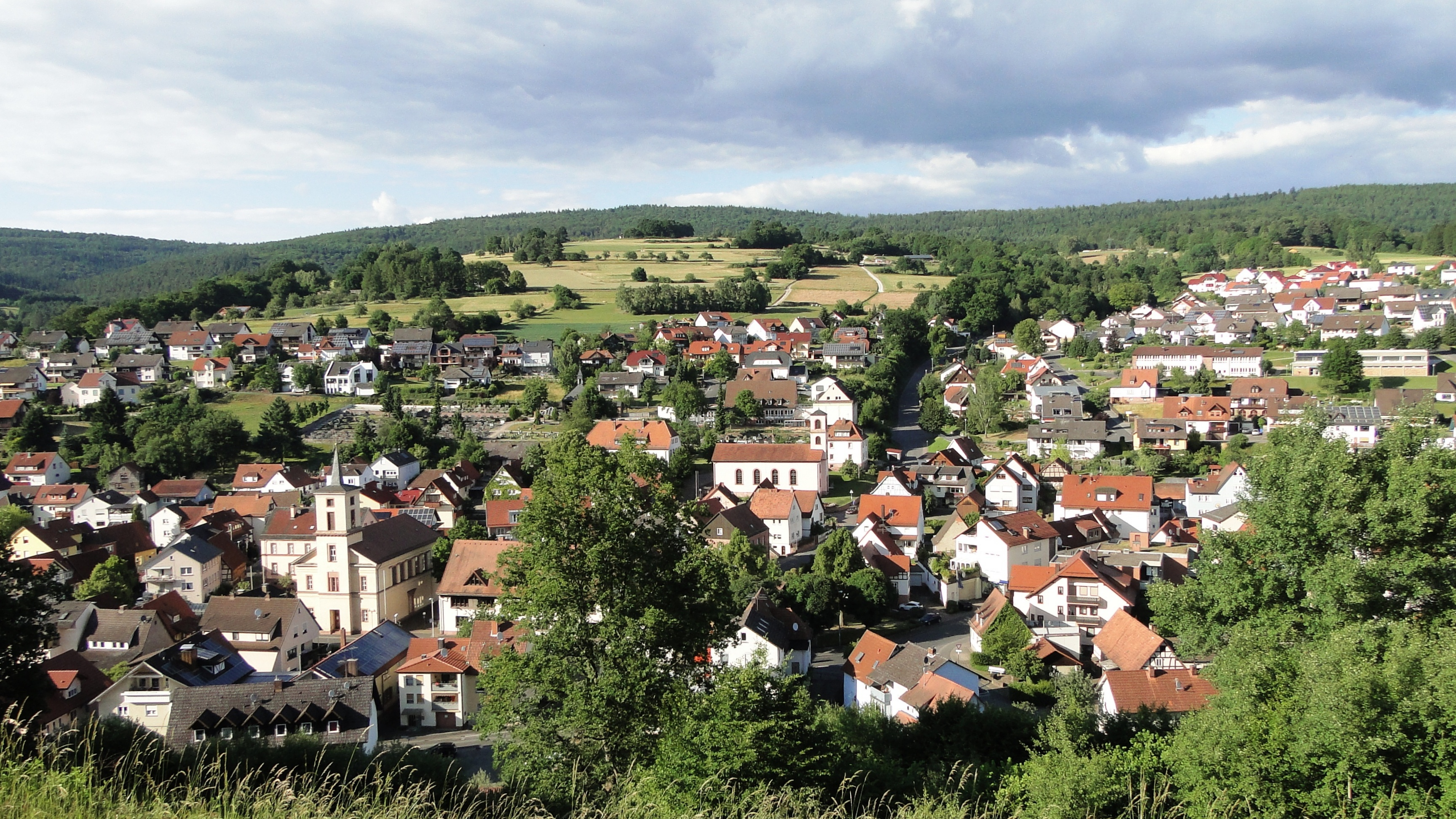
- Partenstein as seen from Burg Bartenstein

- Coat of arms

- Location of Partenstein within Main-Spessart district
- Interactive map of Partenstein
- Location within Germany Location within Bavaria
- Coordinates: 50°3′N 9°31′E
- Country: Germany
- State: Bavaria
- Admin. region: Unterfranken
- District: Main-Spessart
- Municipal assoc.: Partenstein

Government
  - Mayor (2020–26): Stephan Amend (FW)

Area
  - Total: 10.45 km^{2} (4.03 sq mi)
- Elevation: 194 m (636 ft)

Population (2025-12-31)
  - Total: 2,679
  - Density: 256.4/km^{2} (664.0/sq mi)
- Time zone: UTC+01:00 (CET)
  - Summer (DST): UTC+02:00 (CEST)
- Postal codes: 97846
- Dialling codes: 09355
- Vehicle registration: MSP
- Website: partenstein.de

Partenstein (German pronunciation: [ˈpaʁtn̩ʃtaɪn]) is a municipality in the Main-Spessart district in the Regierungsbezirk of Lower Franconia (Unterfranken) in Bavaria, Germany and the seat of the Verwaltungsgemeinschaft (Administrative Community) of Partenstein. Partenstein is located on Bundesstraße 276.

== Geography ==
=== Location ===
Partenstein lies in the Main Spessart Region in the middle of the Spessart (range) on the left bank of the river Lohr, some 7 km northwest of the town of Lohr am Main.

The community has the following Gemarkungen (traditional rural cadastral areas): Partenstein, Partensteiner Forst.

== History ==
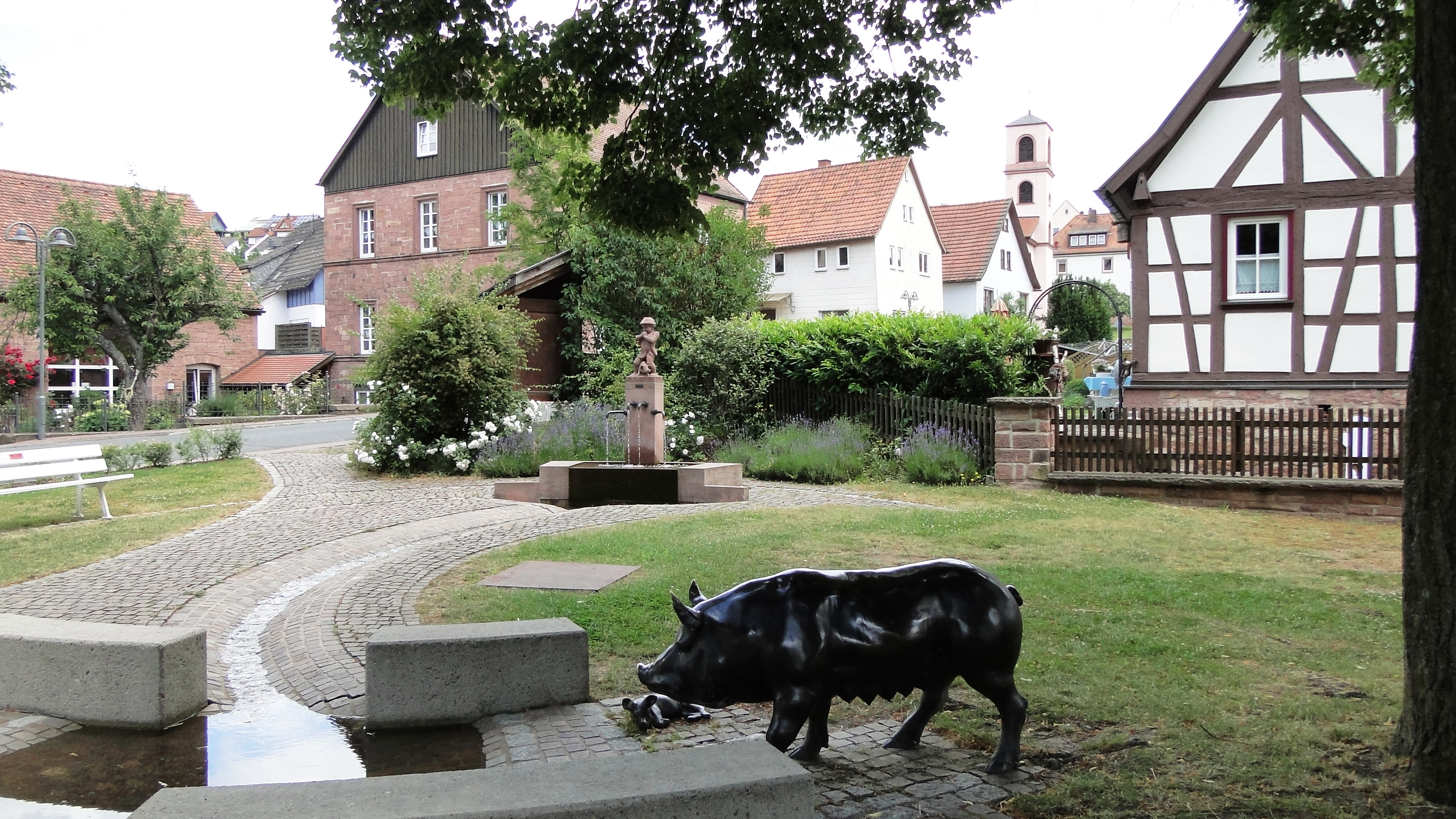
Village square with well, Catholic church in the background

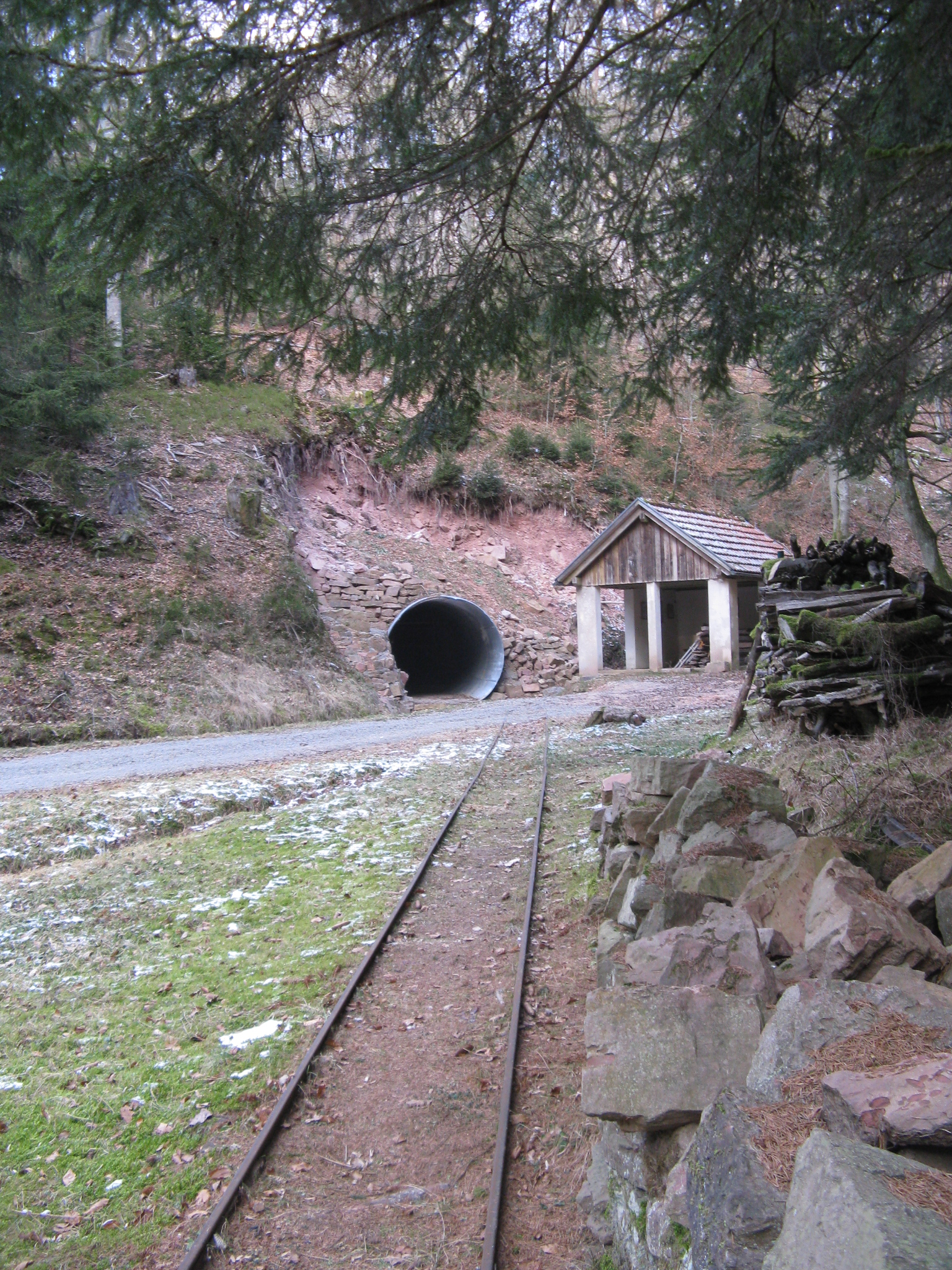
Erichstollen (ancient baryte mining facilities)

The beginnings of Partenstein go back to at least the Middle Ages. The Burg Bartenstein (castle) was built around 1180 by the Counts of Rieneck for hunting and to protect the Wiesener Strasse connecting the village of Langenprozelten on the river Main to the valley of the Kinzig. The Rienecks had vast landholdings, and, during the 13th century, began an expansionist policy. From their main seat of Rieneck, in the east of the Spessart, they expanded, building castles to settle and incorporate additional land.

The first documentary mention of Partenstein is a commentary in 1233 on the disputes that inevitably arose between the Rieneck family and the Archbishops of Mainz, who were rivals for local hegemony. At that time, the Spessart was nearly unpopulated. The Rieneck family bequeathed a one-half share of Partenstein in 1277 to the Lords of Hanau. The other half thereafter belonged to the Archbishopric of Mainz. Both halves were ruled together as a condominium.

The first church here was a chapel inside the castle called the Parish of Partenstein, and a Gothic church was built soon afterwards, in 1471. In 1553, the number of inhabitants in the town had reached 450, and, when the last Count of Rieneck died in 1559, the land was bequeathed to the Archbishops of Mainz. A fire burnt down a large part of the village ten years later.

In 1684, there came a territorial exchange between the County of Hanau and the Archbishopric of Mainz: the Hanau half of the Amt of Partenstein was ceded to the Archbishopric for a one-half share of the Amt of Bieber, likewise ruled together with Mainz.

In the Thirty Years' War, with quartering of soldiers in the city, supplies were looted, cattle were slaughtered, and the place became susceptible to epidemics and disease. In December 1631, the castle was pillaged and destroyed by Swedish troops. Twenty-nine houses in Partenstein were burnt down at this time.

In 1639, the village had only 111 inhabitants, whereas in 1601, there had been 577. In 1677, Partenstein's first Protestant teacher arrived, Johannes Hopf, and 1695 brought a furnished Catholic school.

In 1796, during the War of the First Coalition villagers had to fight off French and German troops, who stole and ruined their property.

The former Amt of Partenstein was granted to the Principality of Aschaffenburg during the German mediatisation in 1803. From 1810 to 1814, the Principality was merged into the Grand Duchy of Frankfurt but it then became part of the Kingdom of Bavaria.

In the mid-19th century, with the coming of Ludwig's Western Railway, which came into service in the Spessart in 1854, industrialization saw its onset. A second line was built 15 years later. Around this time, the economic situation of the village improved and population increased. Jobs had been created by the railway, and citizens also began working in mines and mills. At this time, around 70 percent of the villagers were Protestants, and about 30 percent were Catholics. Most people made their livings as firemen, farmers, singers, businessmen, and mechanics.

The branch of mining that stood out most strongly was baryte mining, which was not abandoned locally until 1948.

At the start of World War I, the village's economy went downhill. The longer the war lasted, the greater the Empire's shortfalls and financial need became. Industrial and agricultural products had to be increased with fewer personnel.

To cover the enormous financial requirements, the population was called twice annually for the purpose of war loans. The peace treaty presented heavy burdens on Germany. The economy could not develop. High reparations and the loss of substantial parts of the country were demoralizing.

An economic upswing took place only in the mid-1930s. However, that changed in 1939 at the start of World War II. Since German industrial areas were being destroyed in the war, their civilian population had to be evacuated.

Only in the years between 1960 and 1970 did the village develop again. The village no longer had a rural character, especially after the roads were removed and the houses grew in size. Not only were homes built in the centre of the area, but they were also built on the lower hills. Among other things built were a school building, a Gymnasium, a deep well and an elevated tank for the water pipeline, a fire brigade equipment house, a town hall and a purification plant shared with the neighbouring municipality of Frammersbach.

The community's history is the topic of the Europäischer Kulturweg Partenstein ("Partenstein European Cultural Way").

== Religion ==
Owing to the influence of the at first Lutheran and later Calvinist County of Hanau, Partenstein is even today one of the few mainly Protestant communities in the Bavarian Spessart.

== Politics ==
=== Community council ===
- First Mayor: Stephan Amend, Freie Wähler
- Second Mayor: Günter Amend, CSU
- Third Mayor: Heiko Steigerwald, Social Democratic Party of Germany

Further members of the community council:

- Arno Bernard, Dominik Brühl, Siegmar Eyrich, Annika Neuf, Konrad Schreier (Freie Wähler)
- Klaus Breitenbach, Johann Seewald, Ute Schawerna-Pedrosa (CSU)
- Berthold Gillner, Erich Imhof, Dirk Mehrlich, Heinz Mehrlich (SPD)

=== Town partnerships ===
- Thise, Doubs, France

=== Coat of arms ===
The community's arms might be described thus: Gules two poleaxes argent in saltire, in base a mount of ten bricks Or.

Poleaxes were once known in German as Parten (they are more commonly called Hellebarden now), while bricks are Bausteine, or simply Steine if the context makes it needless to specify what kind of “stones” they are. These charges make the arms canting for the name Partenstein. The tinctures gules and Or (red and gold) are taken from the arms formerly borne by both the Counts of Rieneck and the Counts of Hanau, who were of great import to the community’s history. The tinctures gules and argent (silver) recall the Electorate of Mainz's hegemony. The arms have been borne since 1969.

== Places of interest ==
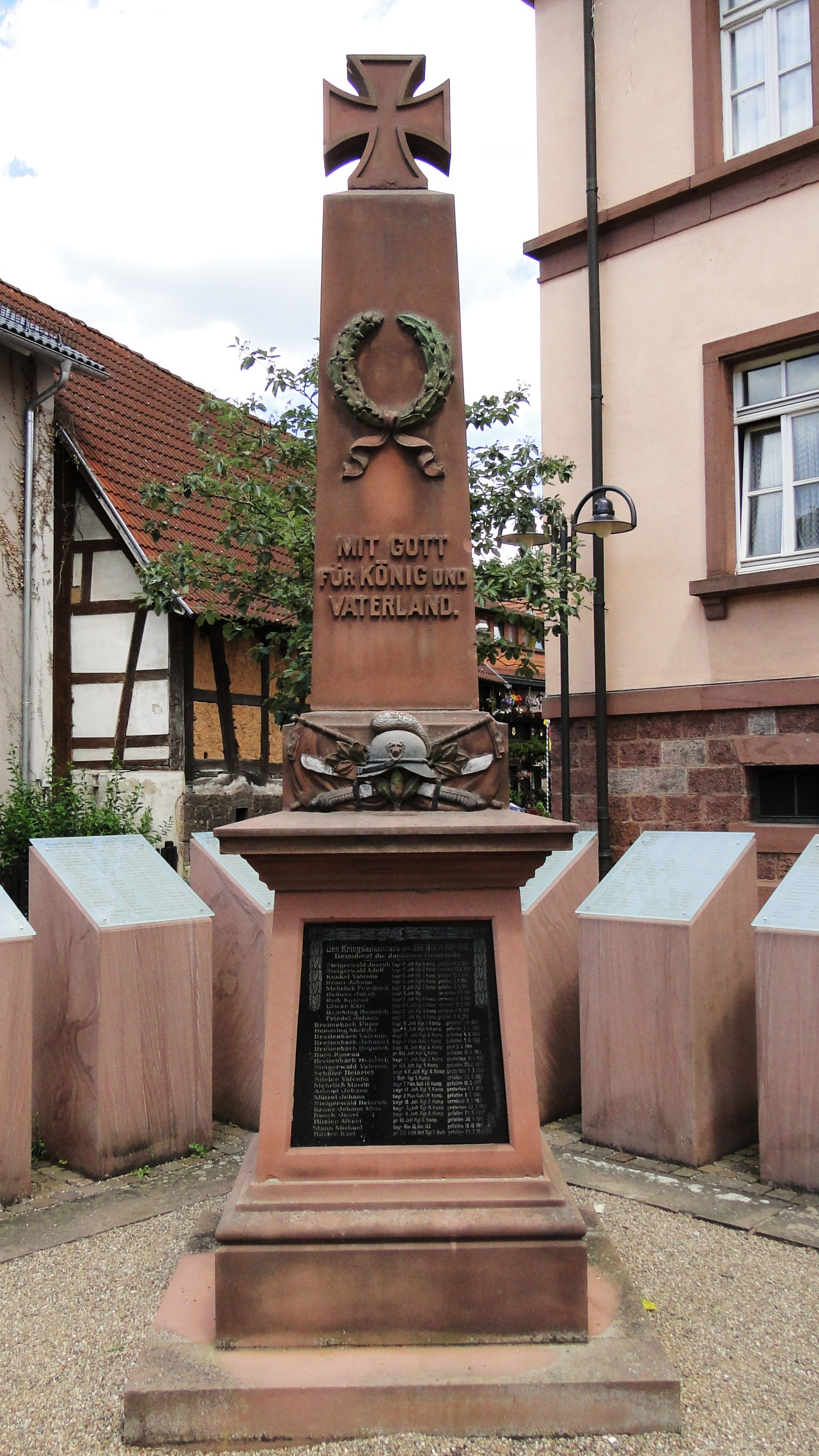
Memorial for the war dead

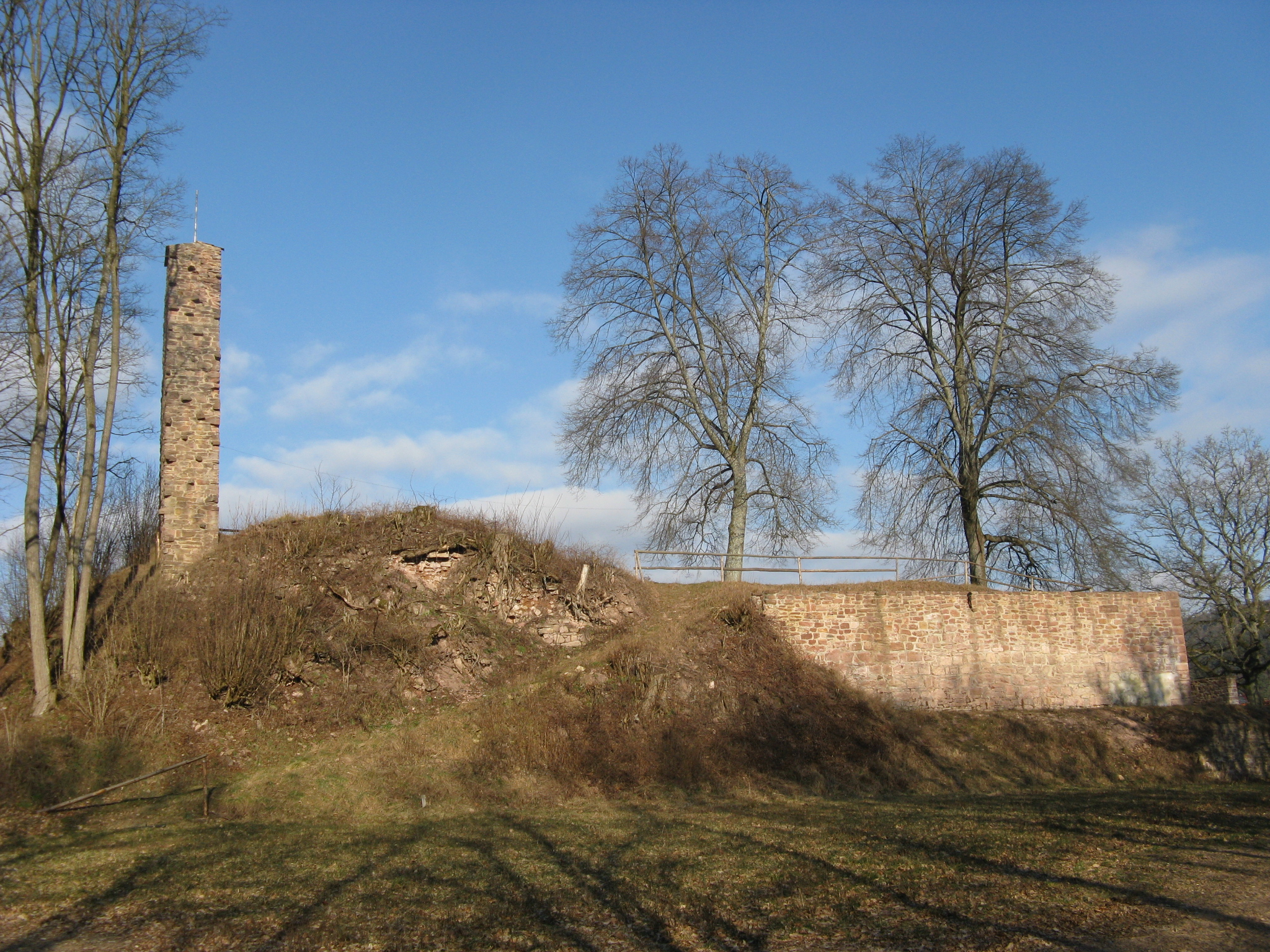
Ruins of Burg Bartenstein

- Protestant parish church, built 1830-1831
- Catholic parish church of Saint John the Baptist, built 1836
- Ruins of Burg Bartenstein, the castle that once belonged to the Counts of Rieneck, destroyed 1633, only the tower now preserved, digs by the Archäologisches Spessartprojekt are ongoing.
- The restored Warriors’ Monument and the likewise restored Fountain Garden

== Economy and infrastructure ==
According to official statistics, there were 167 workers on the social welfare contribution rolls working in producing businesses in 1998. In trade and transport this was 0. In other areas, 90 workers on the social welfare contribution rolls were employed, and 1,090 such workers worked from home. There were 12 processing businesses. Four businesses were in construction, and furthermore, in 1999, there were 12 agricultural operations with a working area of 81 ha, of which 3 ha was cropland and 79 ha was meadowland.

=== Population development ===
Within town limits, 2,516 inhabitants were counted in 1970; 2,683 in 1987; and 2,881 in 2000.

=== Education ===
As of 1999 the following institutions existed in Partenstein:

- Kindergartens: 100 places with 90 children
- Primary schools: 1 with 8 teachers and 153 pupils

== Clubs ==
At this time there are 32 clubs in Partenstein.
