= Aubach (Wiehl) =

River in North Rhine-Westphalia, Germany

Wiehl
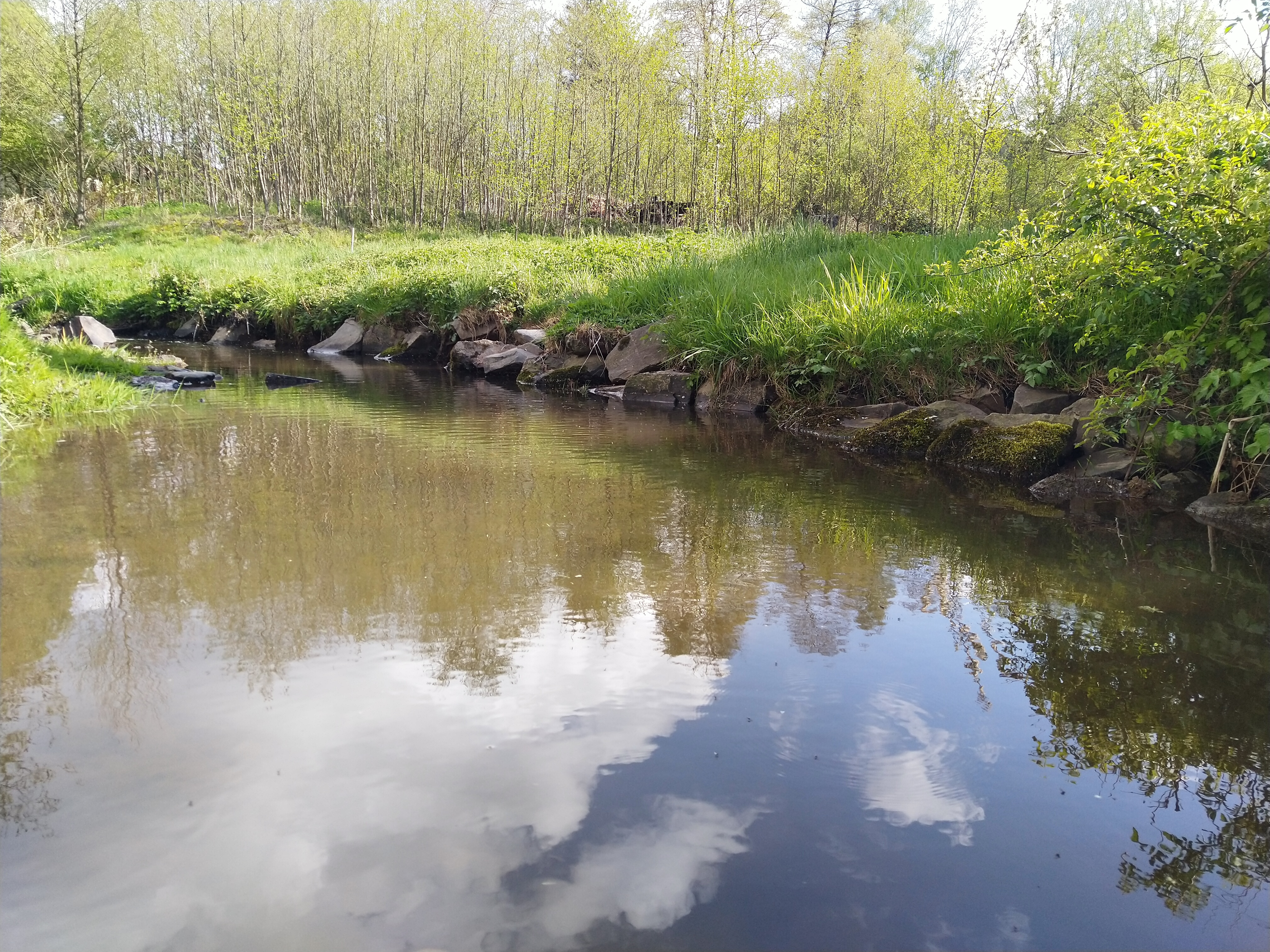
- The Aubach near the Weiherdamm

- Location of mouth

Location
- Country: Germany
- State: North Rhine-Westphalia

Physical characteristics
- Source
  - location: north of Wendershagen
- Mouth
  - coordinates: 50°56′25″N 7°44′54″E
- Length: 3 km (1.9 mi)

The Aubach is an orographically left tributary of the River Wiehl in the German state of North Rhine-Westphalia.

== Geography ==
The Aubach rises north of Wendershagen, at the Heckenweiher, approximately 414 metres (1,358 ft) above sea level. It initially flows in a north-westerly direction. Not far from Erdingen, the Aubach merges with the Mohrenbach, which is about 1 kilometre (0.62 mi) long, then turns to the north-east. In the Pfänderwiese, another tributary, flows from the left into the Aubach. Further to the north, the Aubach reaches the Aubachtal.

The right source stream, also called Schönbach, is about 1 kilometre (0.62 mi) long. It rises in Schönbach, on Rhineland-Palatinate territory, at approximately 395 metres (1,296 ft) above sea level. It continues in a north-easterly direction until the Aubach reaches Wildbergerhütte. There, it unites with the approximately 1.8 kilometres (1.1 mi) long Wildberger stream. It rises in Wildberg to about 382 metres (1,253 ft) m above sea level, and is additionally fed by the roughly 1.2 kilometres (0.75 mi) long Langenbach. The Aubach river then turns north-west and reaches the centre of Wildbergerhütte, along the pond dam. At about 311 metres (1,020 ft) above sea level, the Aubach flows into the Wiehl, after about 3.2 kilometres (2.0 mi) (4.2 kilometres (2.6 mi) with Möhrenbach) to the sports field in Wildbergerhütte.

== Flora ==
The vegetation on the banks of the Aubach River changes along its course. The upper course of the Aubach valley is characterised by dense, shady forests, under which only a sparse layer of herbs flourishes. The middle course is characterised by Alder and Willow species, but also neophytes such as the Reynoutria japonica can be found. Wild herbaceous plants can also be found on the banks of the Aubach River, such as Anemone sylvestris or Ficaria verna.

== Flood ==
On 3 May 2001, torrential rainfall led to flooding, referred to as the flood of the century. Between 16 and 20 o'clock, 110 litres of precipitation per square metre fell. The monthly average in NRW is only 100 litres.
