= Möhrenbach =

- Ortsteil of Gehren
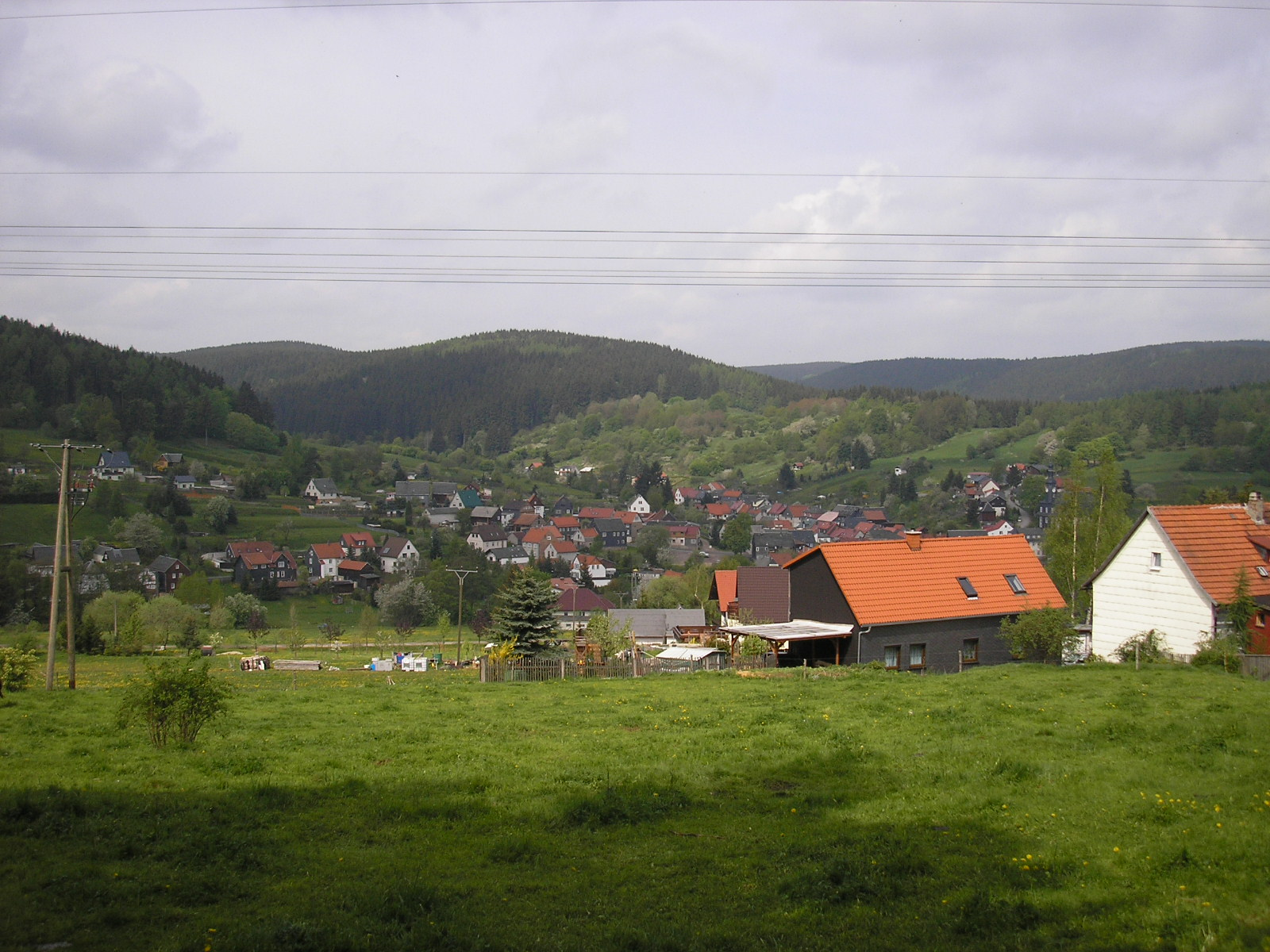
- Möhrenbach

- Coat of arms
- Interactive map of Möhrenbach
- Location within Germany Location within Thuringia
- Coordinates: 50°37′24″N 10°59′41″E
- Country: Germany
- State: Thuringia
- District: Ilm-Kreis
- Municipality: Gehren

Area
  - Total: 13.86 km^{2} (5.35 sq mi)
- Elevation: 540 m (1,770 ft)

Population (2012-12-31)
  - Total: 654
  - Density: 47.2/km^{2} (122/sq mi)
- Time zone: UTC+01:00 (CET)
  - Summer (DST): UTC+02:00 (CEST)
- Postal codes: 98708
- Dialling codes: 036783
- Vehicle registration: IK
- Website: Möhrenbach

Möhrenbach is a village and a former municipality that is located in the district of Ilm-Kreis, in Thuringia, Germany. Since 31 December 2013, it is part of the municipality Gehren.

Möhrenbach history dates back to 1374 as a mining town in the County of Schwarzburg, under the jurisdiction of feudal lords. It was known for mining copper, silver, and lead, and later for porcelain goods and woodworking.

From 1533 to 1920, the village belonged to the district Schwarzburg-Sondershausen, then to the district Arnstadt until 1944. Historic sights in Möhrenbach include the bell tower, World War 1 memorial, and a house dating back to 1606. Today residents enjoy hunting, hiking, and mountain running.
