= Wiesthal =

- Municipality
- Coat of arms

- Location of Wiesthal within Main-Spessart district
- Interactive map of Wiesthal
- Location within Germany Location within Bavaria
- Coordinates: 50°2′N 9°26′E
- Country: Germany
- State: Bavaria
- Admin. region: Unterfranken
- District: Main-Spessart
- Municipal assoc.: Partenstein

Government
  - Mayor (2020–26): Karl-Heinz Hofmann (FW)

Area
  - Total: 9.18 km^{2} (3.54 sq mi)
- Elevation: 250 m (820 ft)

Population (2025-12-31)
  - Total: 1,215
  - Density: 132/km^{2} (343/sq mi)
- Time zone: UTC+01:00 (CET)
  - Summer (DST): UTC+02:00 (CEST)
- Postal codes: 97859
- Dialling codes: 06020
- Vehicle registration: MSP
- Website: www.wiesthal.de

Wiesthal is a municipality in the Main-Spessart district in the Regierungsbezirk of Lower Franconia (Unterfranken) in Bavaria, Germany and a member of the Verwaltungsgemeinschaft (municipal association) of Partenstein. It has a population of around 1,300.

== Geography ==
=== Location ===
Wiesthal lies in the Aschaffenburg region in the Aubach valley in the Mittelgebirge Spessart.

=== Subdivision ===
The community has the following Gemarkungen (traditional rural cadastral areas): Krommenthal and Wiesthal. These are also the two Ortsteile.

== History ==
Wiesthal is an old glassmaking centre and had its first documentary mention in 1057. The small stream, the Aubach, once split the community into two parts, one belonging to the Bishopric of Mainz and the other to the County of Rieneck. After the Counts of Rieneck had died out, their half likewise passed to the Archbishopric of Mainz. The Electoral Mainz Amt was in Prince Primate von Dalberg's favour secularized and passed with his Principality of Aschaffenburg in 1814 (by this time it had become a department of the Grand Duchy of Frankfurt) to the Kingdom of Bavaria.

On 1 January 1972, Krommenthal was merged with Wiesthal.

== Demographics ==
Within town limits, 1,375 inhabitants were counted in 1970, 1,407 in 1987 and in 2000 1,492.

== Economy ==
According to official statistics, there were 208 workers on the social welfare contribution rolls working in producing businesses in 1998. In trade and transport this was 14. In other areas, 33 workers on the social welfare contribution rolls were employed, and 526 such workers worked from home. There were 0 processing businesses. One business was in construction, and furthermore, in 1999, there were 2 agricultural operations.

The biggest employer is the firm Wenzel-Präzision.

Municipal taxes in 1999 amounted to €794,000 (converted), of which net business taxes amounted to €247,000.

== Governance ==
=== Mayor ===
The mayor is Karl-Heinz Hofmann (Freie Wähler), elected in 2020.

=== Town twinning ===
- Városlőd, Veszprém, Hungary

=== Coat of arms ===
The community's arms might be described thus: Barry of ten gules and Or a saltire argent surmounted by two glassblower's pipes per saltire of the first, mouthpieces to base.

The Counts of Rieneck bore arms with the field design seen in Wiesthal's arms, and indeed this pattern is meant to recall the time when they held half the community when the local brook was the border between their fief and that held by Mainz. The tinctures gules and argent (red and silver) recall this latter state's former hegemony over the whole community once the Counts had died out (and before that over the other half). The glassblower's pipes recall that Wiesthal was once a glassmaking community, and that the inhabitants, whether lumberjacks, potash makers, waggoners or actually glassmakers, were more or less all somehow linked to glassmaking. The saltire (X-shaped cross), or Saint Andrew's Cross, stands for the chapel, which was already standing by 1477, before the parish of Wiesthal was founded.

The arms have been borne since 1977.

== Arts and culture ==
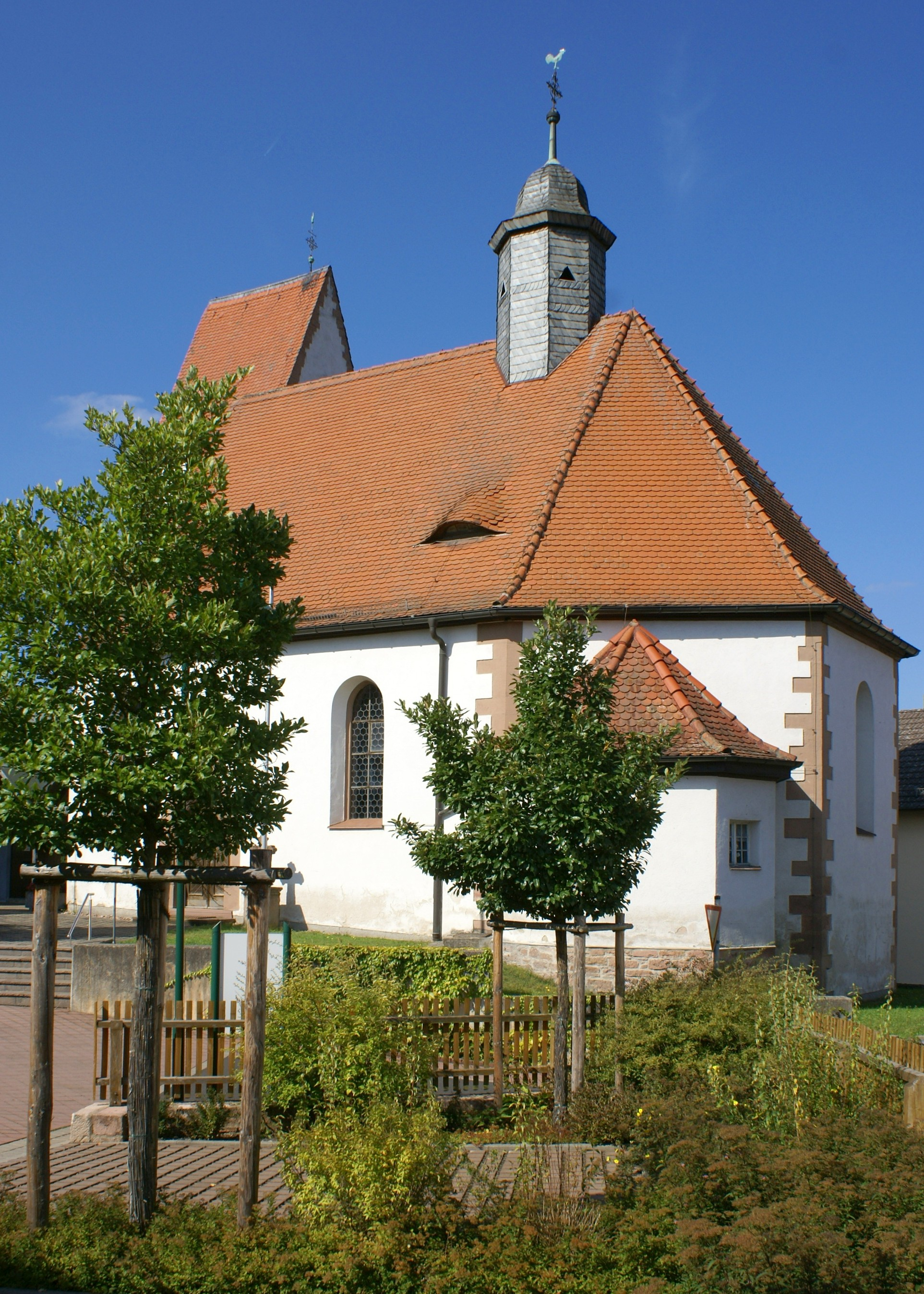
Pfarrkirche St. Andreas

- Pfarrkirche St. Andreas, Catholic parish church, built 1599/1600
- Ruh- or Mühlhansenmühle, the last of formerly six mills in the community
- Custom: Faselsrad (or Foaseltsroad in the local speech), on Shrove Tuesday (Faschingsdienstag)

== Infrastructure ==
=== Transport ===
Wiesthal has a stop on the Main-Spessart railway. It is also located on State Road 2317.

== Education ==
In 1999 the following institutions existed in Wiesthal:

- Kindergartens: 50 places with 50 children
- Primary schools with 11 teachers and 211 pupils
