= Trésor de la langue française au Québec =

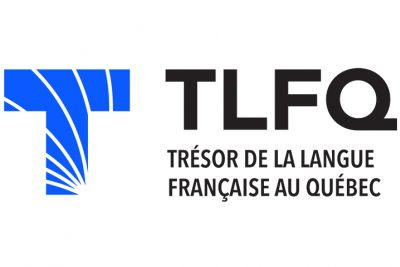
Trésor de la langue française au Québec logo.

The Trésor de la langue française au Québec (Treasury of the French language in Quebec, TLFQ) is a project created in the 1970s with the primary objective of establishing a scientific infrastructure for research into the history of Quebec French and, also, its current usage. The project is affiliated to the Centre interdisciplinaire de recherches sur les activités langagières (CIRAL) at Université Laval.

The main fruit of the project is the Dictionnaire historique du français québécois (Historical dictionary of Quebec French), published in 1998. It has also contributed to other dictionaries, such as the Dictionnaire du français Plus (1988), the Dictionnaire universel francophone, the Dictionnaire du français acadien (1999), and the Petit Larousse (2001 to 2006 editions).

Since the late 1990s, the TLFQ has led the international project Base de données lexicographiques panfrancophone (Panfrancophone lexicographic database) (BDLP), whose goal is to develop and bring together databases representative of the French used in Francophonie member countries.

== Members ==
- Claude Poirier, director of research
- Myriam Côté, documentalist, responsible for training for the BDLP
- Geneviève Joncas, researcher, lexicographer
- Jean-François Smith, linguist, computer scientist and web master
- Jacques Leclerc, linguist, associate member, responsible for the site L'aménagement linguistique dans le monde (language demographics and language policies worldwide)

== Current projects ==
- Digitalization of the lexical database created by the TLFQ over some 20 years
- The second edition of the Dictionnaire historique du français québécois
- Annotated Timeline of Quebec French online
- BDLP-Québec, the Québec section of the BDLP
