= Aubach (Lohr) =

River in Germany

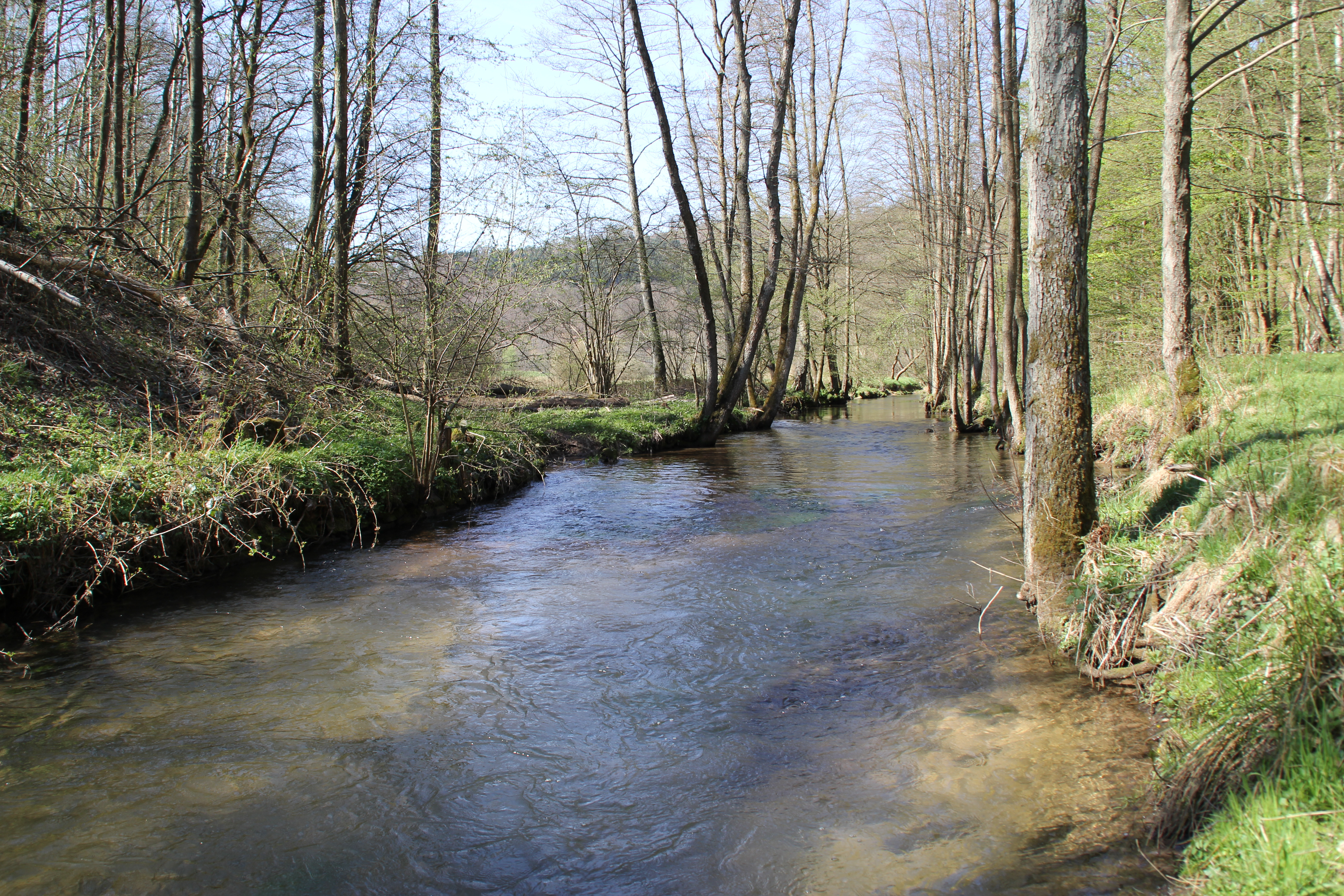
- The Aubach at Krommenthal (part of Wiesthal)

- Location of mouth in Bavaria

Location
- Country: Germany
- State: Bavaria

Physical characteristics
- Mouth
  - location: Lohr
  - coordinates: 50.0383°N 9.5203°E
- Length: 22.4 km (13.9 mi)

Basin features
- Progression: Lohr→ Main→ Rhine→ North Sea

Aubach is a river in Bavaria, Germany. It is a right tributary of the Lohr in Partenstein.

== See also ==
- List of rivers of Bavaria
