= Flörsbach =

Flörsbach may refer to:

- Flörsbach (Lohr), a river in Hesse, Germany, tributary of the Lohr
- Flörsbach, a district of the municipality Flörsbachtal in Hesse, Germany
