= Rinderbach =

Rinderbach may refer to:

- Rinderbach (Ruhr), a river of North Rhine-Westphalia, Germany, tributary of the Ruhr
- Rinderbach (Brehmbach), a river of Baden-Württemberg, Germany, tributary of the Brehmbach
- Rinderbach (Lohr), a river of Bavaria, Germany, tributary of the Lohr
- the village Rinderbach that is part of Rüegsau in the Swiss canton of Bern
- the hamlet Rinderbach that is part of Affoltern im Emmental in the Swiss canton of Bern
- the district Rinderbach that is part of Heimiswil in the Swiss canton of Bern
