= Laubersbach =

River in Germany

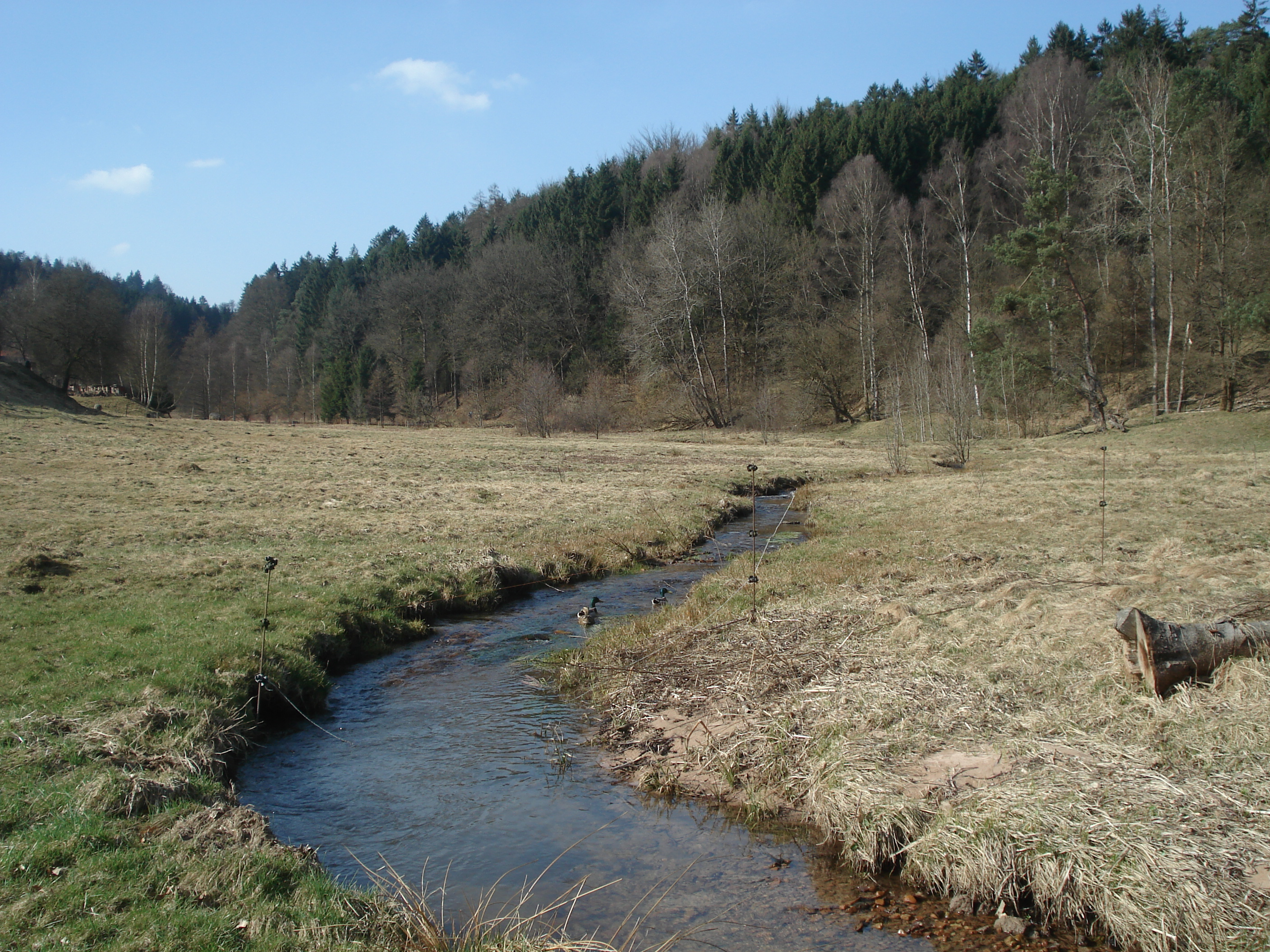
- The Laubersbach before Frammersbach

Location
- Country: Germany
- States: Bavaria

Physical characteristics
- Mouth
  - location: Lohr
  - coordinates: 50.0632°N 9.4738°E

Basin features
- Progression: Lohr→ Main→ Rhine→ North Sea

Laubersbach is a river of Bavaria, Germany. It flows into the Lohr in Frammersbach.

== See also ==
- List of rivers of Bavaria
