= Rinderbach (Brehmbach) =

River in Germany

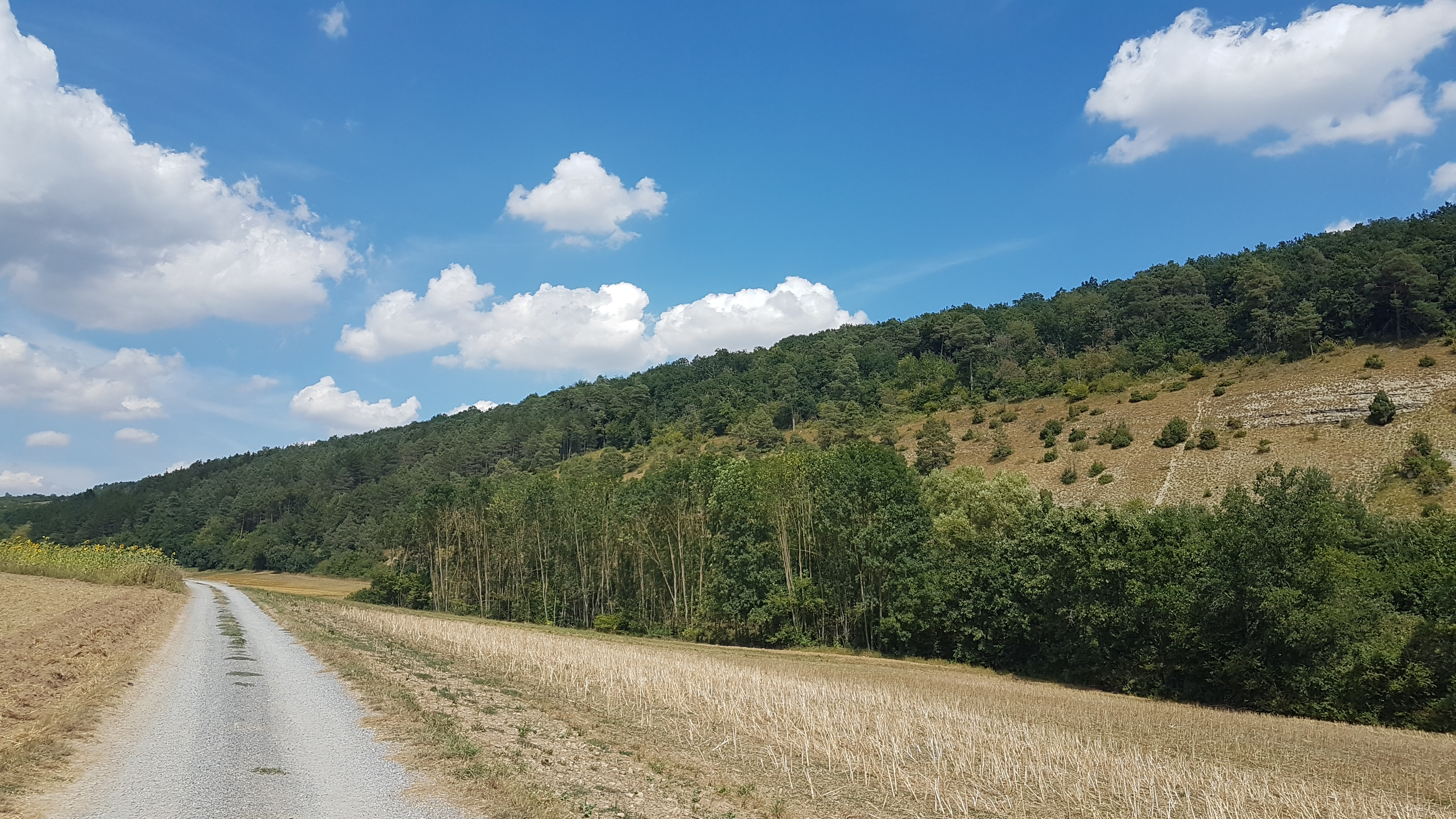

Location
- Country: Germany
- State: Baden-Württemberg

Physical characteristics
- Source
  - location: in Dienstadt, a district of Tauberbischofsheim
  - coordinates: 49.6321°N 9.6134°E
- Mouth
  - location: between Tauberbischofsheim and Königheim into the Brehmbach
  - coordinates: 49.6157°N 9.6238°E

Rinderbach is a river of Baden-Württemberg, Germany. It is a left tributary of the Brehmbach.

== See also ==
- List of rivers of Baden-Württemberg
