= Rinderbach (Lohr) =

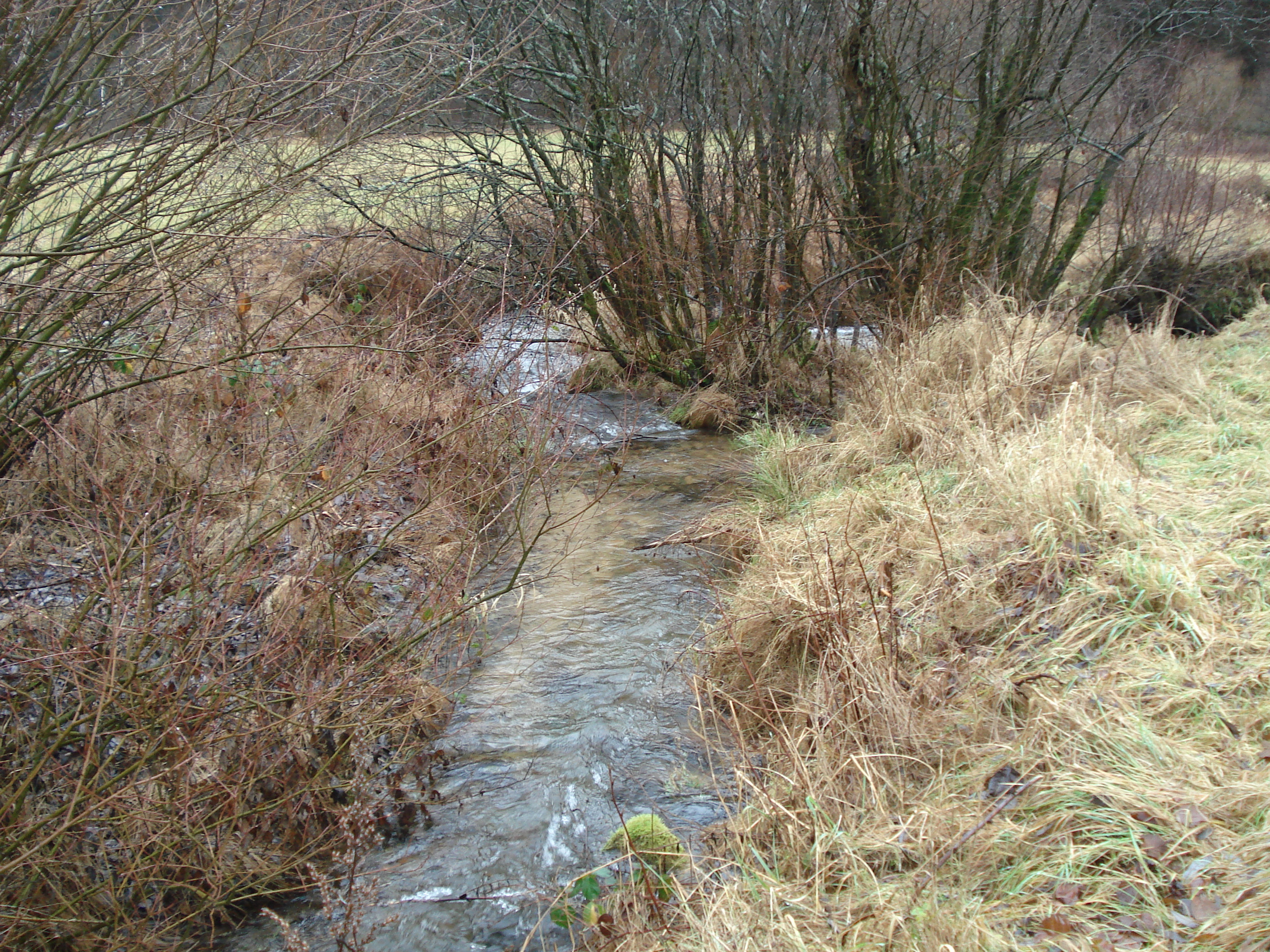

Location
- Country: Germany
- States: Bavaria

Physical characteristics
- Mouth
  - location: Lohr
  - coordinates: 50.0830°N 9.4593°E
- Length: 1.8 km

Basin features
- Progression: Lohr→ Main→ Rhine→ North Sea

Rinderbach is a small river of Bavaria, Germany. It is a left tributary of the Lohr near Frammersbach.

== See also ==
- List of rivers of Bavaria
