= Brehmbach =

River in Germany

- The Brehmbach in Königheim

Location
- Country: Germany
- State: Baden-Württemberg

Physical characteristics
- Mouth
  - location: Tauber
  - coordinates: 49.6194°N 9.6681°E
- Length: 18.4 km (11.4 mi)

Basin features
- Progression: Tauber→ Main→ Rhine→ North Sea

The Brehmbach is a river in Baden-Württemberg, Germany. It flows into the Tauber in Tauberbischofsheim.

== See also ==
- List of rivers of Baden-Württemberg
