= Lohrbach (Lohr) =

River in Germany

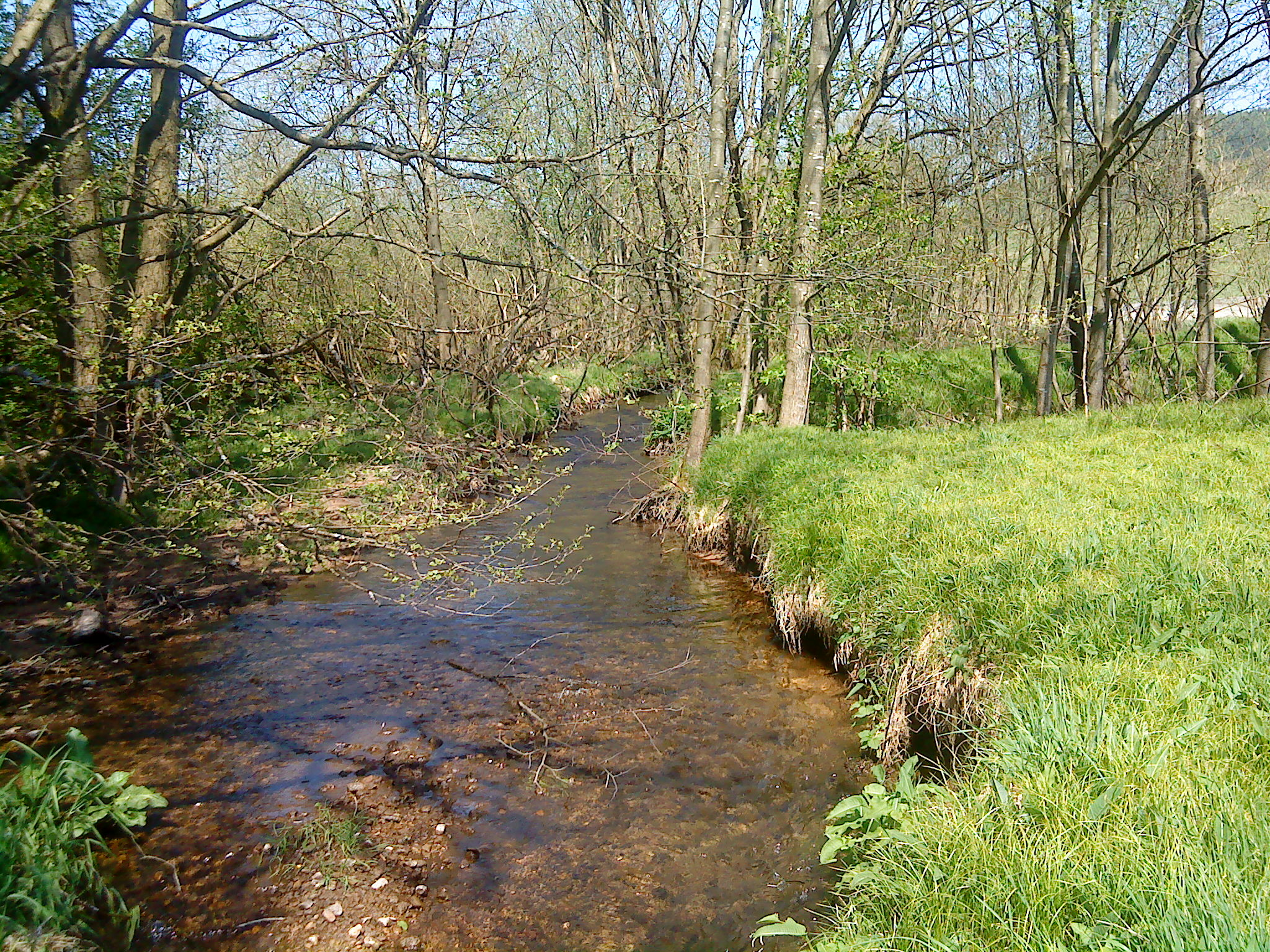
- Lohrbach south of Lohrhaupten

Location
- Country: Germany
- State: Hesse

Physical characteristics
- Source
  - location: Lohrquelle at Lohrhaupten
  - elevation: c. 370 m (1,210 ft) above sea level
- Mouth
  - location: Joins Flörsbach to form the Lohr near Kempfenbrunn
  - coordinates: 50.1007°N 9.4600°E
  - elevation: 270 m (890 ft) above sea level
- Length: 4.5 km (2.8 mi)

Basin features
- Progression: Lohr→ Main→ Rhine→ North Sea

Lohrbach is a small river in the municipality of Flörsbachtal in the Main-Kinzig district of Hesse, Germany.

== Course ==
The stream originates in the village of Lohrhaupten ("head of the Lohr") at the Lohrquelle. It then flows southwest and then south until it joins the Flörsbach to form the Lohr southeast of Kempfenbrunn.

== See also ==
- List of rivers of Hesse
- Spessart
