= Frammersbach =

- Municipality
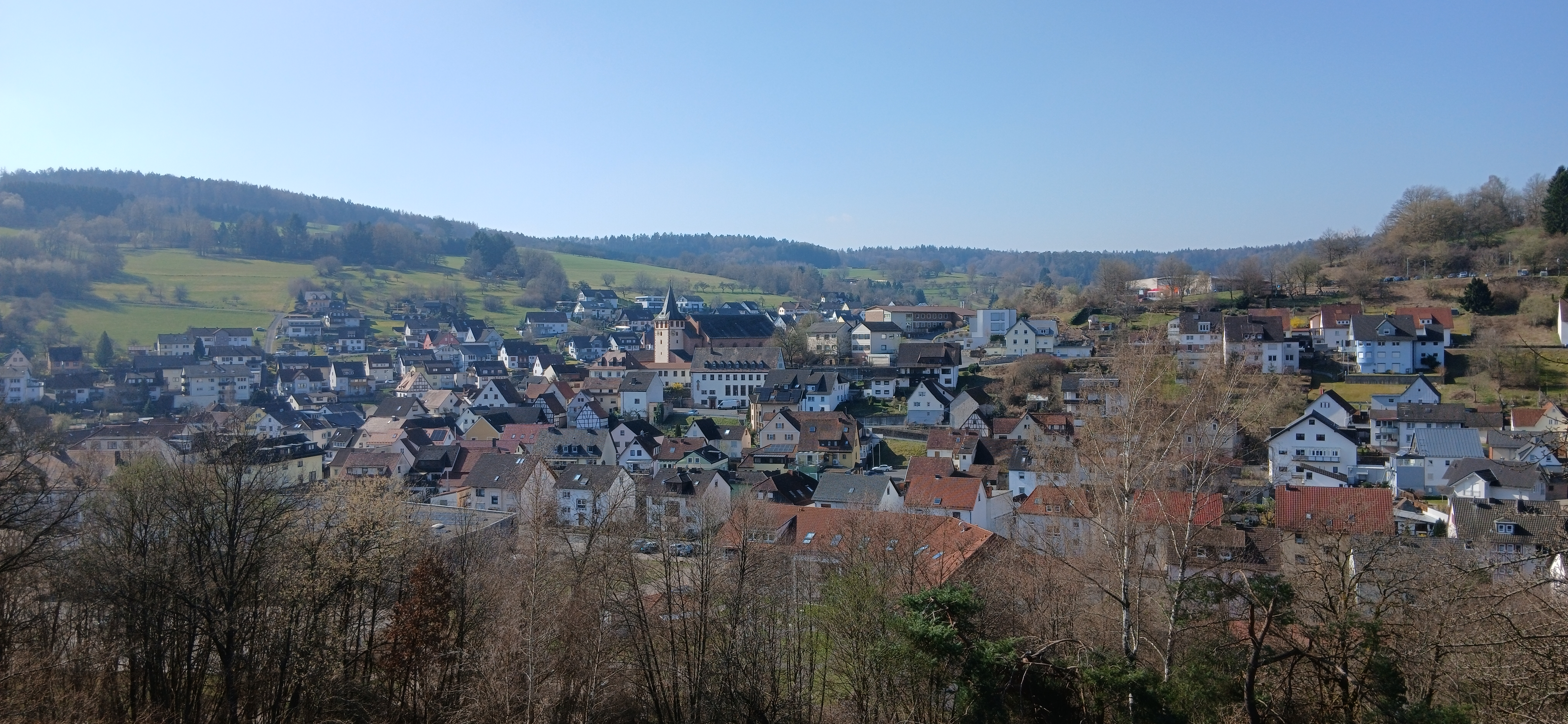
- Frammersbach from Bäckersberg ("Baker's Hill")

- Coat of arms

- Location of Frammersbach within Main-Spessart district
- Interactive map of Frammersbach
- Location within Germany Location within Bavaria
- Coordinates: 50°4′N 9°28′E
- Country: Germany
- State: Bavaria
- Admin. region: Lower Franconia
- District: Main-Spessart

Government
  - Mayor (2022–28): Christian Holzemer (SPD)

Area
  - Total: 19.19 km^{2} (7.41 sq mi)
- Elevation: 246 m (807 ft)

Population (2025-12-31)
  - Total: 4,404
  - Density: 229.5/km^{2} (594.4/sq mi)
- Time zone: UTC+01:00 (CET)
  - Summer (DST): UTC+02:00 (CEST)
- Postal codes: 97833
- Dialling codes: 0 93 55
- Vehicle registration: MSP
- Website: www.frammersbach.de

Frammersbach (German pronunciation: [ˈfʁamɐsˌbax]) is a market municipality in the Main-Spessart district in the Regierungsbezirk of Lower Franconia (Unterfranken) in Bavaria, Germany. In the early modern period, people from Frammersbach achieved international renown as drivers of wagons on the most important trans-European trade routes. Today, Frammersbach has a population of around 4,500.

== Geography ==
=== Location ===
This state-recognized resort (staatlich anerkannter Erholungsort) lies between Würzburg und Aschaffenburg, in the middle of the Spessart Nature Park (Naturpark Spessart).

The municipal territory borders on the state of Hesse in places and is not continuous: Habichsthal is separated from Frammersbach proper by the wooded unincorporated area of the Frammersbacher Forst. On all other sides, the village is surrounded by the Heinrichsthaler Forst (located in the neighbouring Aschaffenburg district).

Frammersbach is located in the valley of the Lohr river, while Habichsthal lies in a side valley of the Aubach, which flows into the Lohr at Partenstein. Out of a total municipal area of around 2,000 hectares, about 700 hectares are covered by communally-owned forest.

Nearby hills are the Wellersberg, Eichenberg and the Hermannskoppe.

=== Subdivisions ===
The community has the following Gemarkungen (traditional rural cadastral areas): Frammersbach and Habichsthal. These are also Frammersbach's two Ortsteile (boroughs).

The former villages Herbertshain, Hofreith and Schwartel have been absorbed into Frammersbach proper.

=== Neighbouring communities ===
The neighbouring communities are from the north, clockwise: Flörsbachtal (Hesse), the unincorporated areas Haurain and Frammersbacher Forst, Partenstein, Partensteiner Forst (unincorporated area), Wiesthal, Heinrichsthaler Forst (unincorporated area), again Frammersbacher Forst and finally Wiesen.

== History ==
There have been archaeological finds in the area dating to the Stone Age, the Bronze Age, and the Iron Age.

The locality was systematically settled at the time when the Franks took the land. In around 500, a hunting outpost was established at the site of today's parish church. Through the 8th century, this was gradually expanded into a Zehnthof (tithe court) and fortified by an earthen rampart. Around 1000 a wall with five or six towers was constructed inside the rampart. The tithe court of Frammersbach belonged to the Catholic parish of Lohrhaupten (Flörsbachtal).

In 1314, Herbertshain is first mentioned in a surviving record. Until recently, the earliest mention of Frammersbach itself was thought to have been in 1339. However, new evidence suggests it was in fact also mentioned in 1314.

In 1553, Frammersbach converted to Protestantism under the Counts of Rieneck. After the family died out, Frammersbach fell to the Archbishop of Mainz in 1559. In 1605, the village reverted to Catholicism.

A window on village life is found in the Sechserbuch – a book mainly about Frammersbach's Feldgeschworene, the traditional boundary keepers who decided where the community’s limits were and who were charged with marking them – which describes the state of affairs in a Spessart community in the waning years of the Middle Ages and the onset of the modern era, in particular the records of the decisions of the village court between 1572 and 1764.

In that early modern period — beginning in the 15th century — carters from Frammersbach dominated the long distance trade on two of the most important European routes: from Nuremberg to Antwerp and from Leipzig to Frankfurt (following the Via Regia). There were two reasons for the prominent role played by the people from this small town. For one, Frammersbach was well connected to the major trade routes by the Wiesener Strasse and then the Birkenhainer Strasse. Secondly, the Counts of Rieneck recognized the economic potential of the long distance trade and supported it. The carters built on these advantages by establishing an international acclaim for their performance. In 1522, two of them managed twice to cover 100 kilometres in a single day's travel, when the normal speed for carts was around 30 kilometres a day.

During the Thirty Years' War, the village was sacked by Swedish troops and was temporarily completely depopulated in 1635. The town was resettled, however, and in 1665 Frammersbach was granted the status of Markt.

In 1803, with the Reichsdeputationshauptschluss, the former Amt of the Archbishopric of Mainz passed, along with the village, to Prince Primate Karl von Dalberg's newly formed Principality of Aschaffenburg (1803–10), with which in 1814 it passed to the Kingdom of Bavaria under the terms of the Treaties of Paris, having previously been part of the Grand Duchy of Frankfurt (1810-4).

In the 20th century, home tailoring became an important industry in Frammersbach, as did a clothing factory owned by Alfons Müller-Wipperfürth.

In 1952, the community's official name was set to be Markt Frammersbach. On 1 January 1975, Habichsthal was merged with Frammersbach. At the same time, it was awarded the status of resort.

== Economy ==
The market community of Frammersbach has grown into a commercial centre and has regional supply functions for the community of Partenstein lying to the south and the community of Flörsbachtal lying to the north, just across the boundary in Hesse as well as the community of Jossgrund. The feeder area of the lesser centre of Frammersbach is home to roughly 18,500 inhabitants. Frammersbach lies on the Partenstein-Frammersbach-Wiesen-Aschaffenburg regional development axis.

== Arts and culture ==
=== Culture ===
- Gemeinde-Bücherei (library)
- Fuhrmanns- und Schneidermuseum (waggoners’ and tailors’ museum)
- Mälzereimuseum (malting)

=== Churches ===
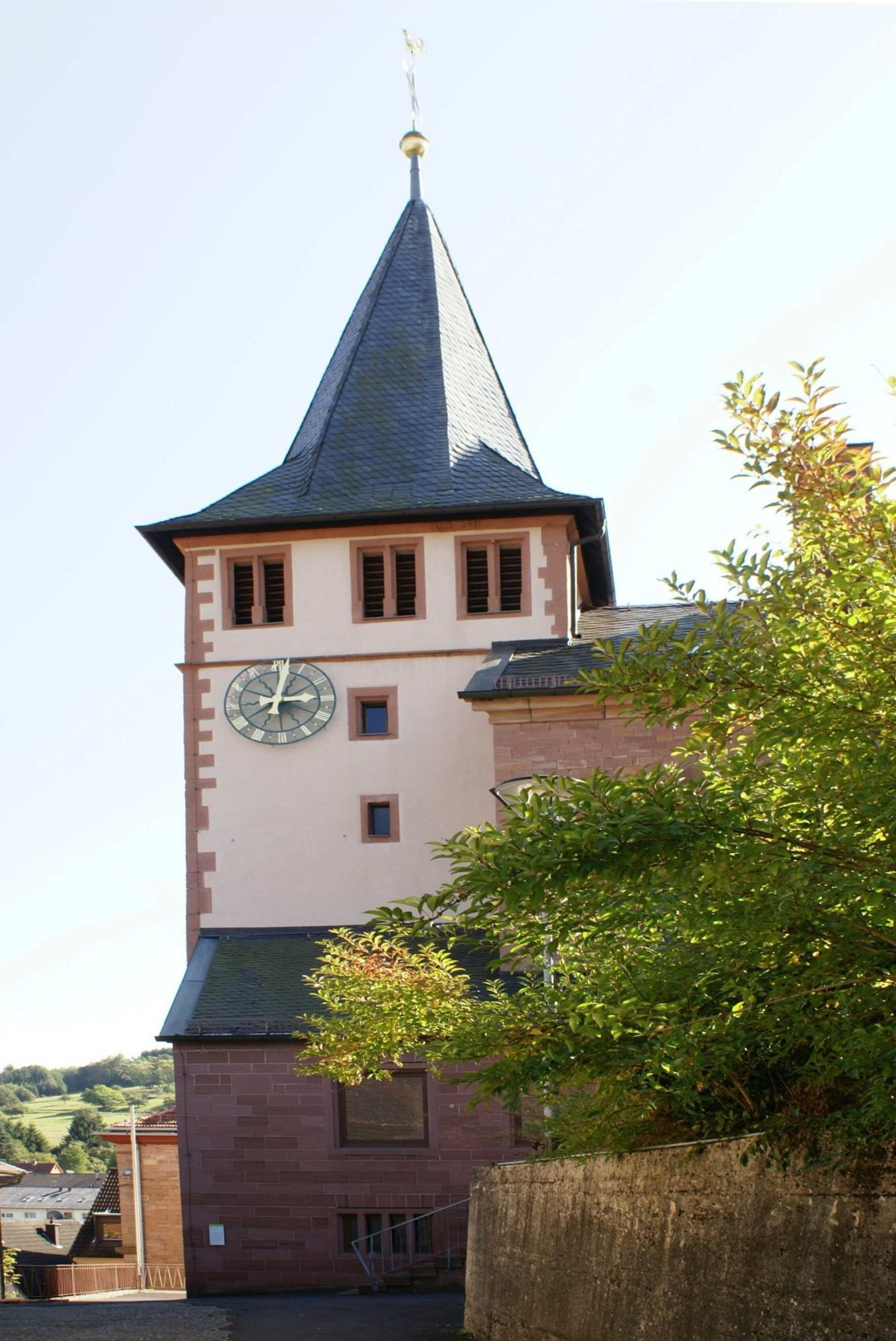
Parish church St. Bartholomäus

- Pfarrkirche St. Bartholomäus (Saint Bartholomew's Roman Catholic parish church) — established as a parish church in 1416. The tower was part of the medieval Zehnthof, the nave was rebuilt after Frammersbach became Protestant in the 16th century. In 1591, two floors were added to the tower, before the village reverted to Catholicism in 1605. In 1847, the nave was again torn down and rebuilt. At the time, demolition of the Kreuzkapelle (see below) for construction materials was considered.
- Pfarrkirche St. Thekla (Saint Thecla's parish church, in Habichsthal) — the first church at Habichsthal was built in 1764. It was partially torn down for lack of space in 1926 and expanded. Only the back of the old church remained, now serving as the church's choir. The church was renovated in several stages between 1974 and 1984. Another renovation followed in the 1990s.
- Evangelische Friedenskirche (Protestant Peace Church) — built 1975/76.
- Kreuzkapelle (Cross Chapel) — this chapel is likely the oldest church in the area between Lohrhaupten (Flörsbachtal), Lohr am Main and Aschaffenburg. It initially served the local glass makers (at Wiesthal, Habichsthal, Neuhütten, Krommenthal and Heigenbrücken) and was built in the 14th century, sponsored by the Stiftskirche Aschaffenburg collegiate church. After parishes were established at Frammersbach (1416) and Wiesthal (1477), the Kreuzkapelle lost its role in serving the glass making population. The chapel was nevertheless renovated in 1506 and given its current form in 1681-5. Until the late 18th century, it served as a destination for pilgrims on occasion of the holiday of Kreuzauffindung. In 1801, a Wallfahrt on the holy day of Saint Roch was established. The chapel is located on a hill southwest of the centre of Frammersbach, on what used to be the Wiesener Strasse.

=== Sport and leisure facilities ===
- Heated outdoor terraced swimming pool
- Orber Straße sport area
- Skating facility with quarter pipe
- Sport area on the Sauerberg
- Winter sport area on the Sauerberg with ski slope and skilift, cross-country skiing, sledding slope and a managed ski hut
- Triple sport hall with outdoor sport facilities (football and basketball)
- Model aircraft field run by the Frammersbach Air Sport Club
- Starting place for paragliders
- Shooting house with airgun shooting facility
- Forest adventure path and three cultural hiking paths
- Several mountain bike courses; Frammersbach is where the Internationaler Spessart-Bike-Marathon is held, and in 2005 the European championship in mountain bike marathon was held here; It was also a staging point in the CRAFT Bike Trans Germany in 2006
- Water treading (hydrotherapy) facilities in the Lohr and Lauberbach valleys

=== Clubs ===
In Frammersbach 45 local clubs are currently active.

=== Customs and festivals ===
- Cock crowing contest on 1 May in the Wellers valley
- Köhlerfest (Charburners’ Festival) at Whitsuntide
- Bike-Marathon in late June
- Orchestral Hoffest after summer’s onset
- Frammersbacher Festtage (Festival Days), but commonly known as Großes Fest (Great Festival), early July
- Fire Brigade Festival at the Kreuzkapelle, late July
- Kirb (kermis, or church consecration festival), late August, at which 17- and 18-year-old youths are welcomed into the world of adulthood. The ceremony is conducted with well established rituals and is closely bound with consuming a great deal of alcohol. It is believed that formerly, young lads from the village celebrated the end of their apprenticeships with this festival.

== Government ==
=== Coat of arms ===
The community’s arms might be described thus: Per pale argent a waggoner vert and gules in chief a wheel of the first spoked of six and in base three closets Or.

The wheel is the Wheel of Mainz, and the closets (that is, narrow horizontal bars) are drawn from the arms borne by the Counts of Rieneck, which themselves go back to those borne by the Counts of Loon.

== Twin towns – sister cities ==
- Orbec, France, since 1988
- Mecseknádasd, Hungary, since 2003

The latter place is home to descendants of emigrants from Frammersbach who still speak a dialect of German rather like the one spoken in Frammersbach.

- Jáchymov, Czech Republic

This is a sponsorship arrangement initiated on 14 May 1977 by former citizens from St. Joachimsthal's (now called Jáchymov) outlying centre of Dürnberg (now called Suchá) who after being driven out of their old homeland came to live in Frammersbach. Both regions were protected forests (Bannwälder) where one could settle only on the edges. In both areas was an Eselsweg (“ass’s way”) and in each was a village with a greater than average number of people working in goods transport, Frammersbach in the Spessart and Reischdorf (now called Rusová) in the Ore Mountains.

== Infrastructure ==
=== Transport ===
Through Frammersbach run Bundesstraße 276, going north-south, and Staatsstraße (State Road) 2305, going east-west.

The nearest Autobahn interchanges are:

- on the A 3 towards Frankfurt, the Hösbach interchange (32 km), and towards Nuremberg, the Rottendorf interchange (64 km);
- on the A 7 towards Kassel, the Hammelburg interchange (48 km), and towards Ulm, the Biebelried interchange (68 km);
- on the A 66 towards Frankfurt, the Gelnhausen interchange (30 km), and towards Fulda, the Bad Orb interchange (28 km).

Frammersbach is linked to local transport on weekdays through the following bus routes:

- Lohr-Partenstein-Frammersbach
- Frammersbach-Habichsthal-Wiesthal
- Frammersbach-Flörsbachtal-Jossgrund-Bad Orb

Frammersbach has no direct link to the DB railway network. The nearest railway station is at Partenstein, 5 km away. Railway goods transport is handled through the station at Lohr am Main, 13 km away. Both stations lie on DB’s Nuremberg-Frankfurt mainline.

The nearest airport is Frankfurt Airport, which can be reached on the A 3 or the A 66. The distance is about 80 km, while Nuremberg Airport lies roughly 160 km away.

== Education ==
=== Schools ===
- Frammersbach primary school and Hauptschule (two-stream associated school),
- Branch of the folk high school in Lohr am Main

=== Kindergartens ===
- Kinderkrippe St. Josef
- Kindergarten St. Elisabeth

=== Youth work ===
- Jugendhaus Franziskus
- Jugendzentrum Magic Box

== Notable people ==
- Burkhard Büdel, lichen researcher, professor at the University of Kaiserslautern
- Lennart Karl (born 2008), German footballer for FC Bayern Munich
