= Hermannskoppe =

Mountain in Germany

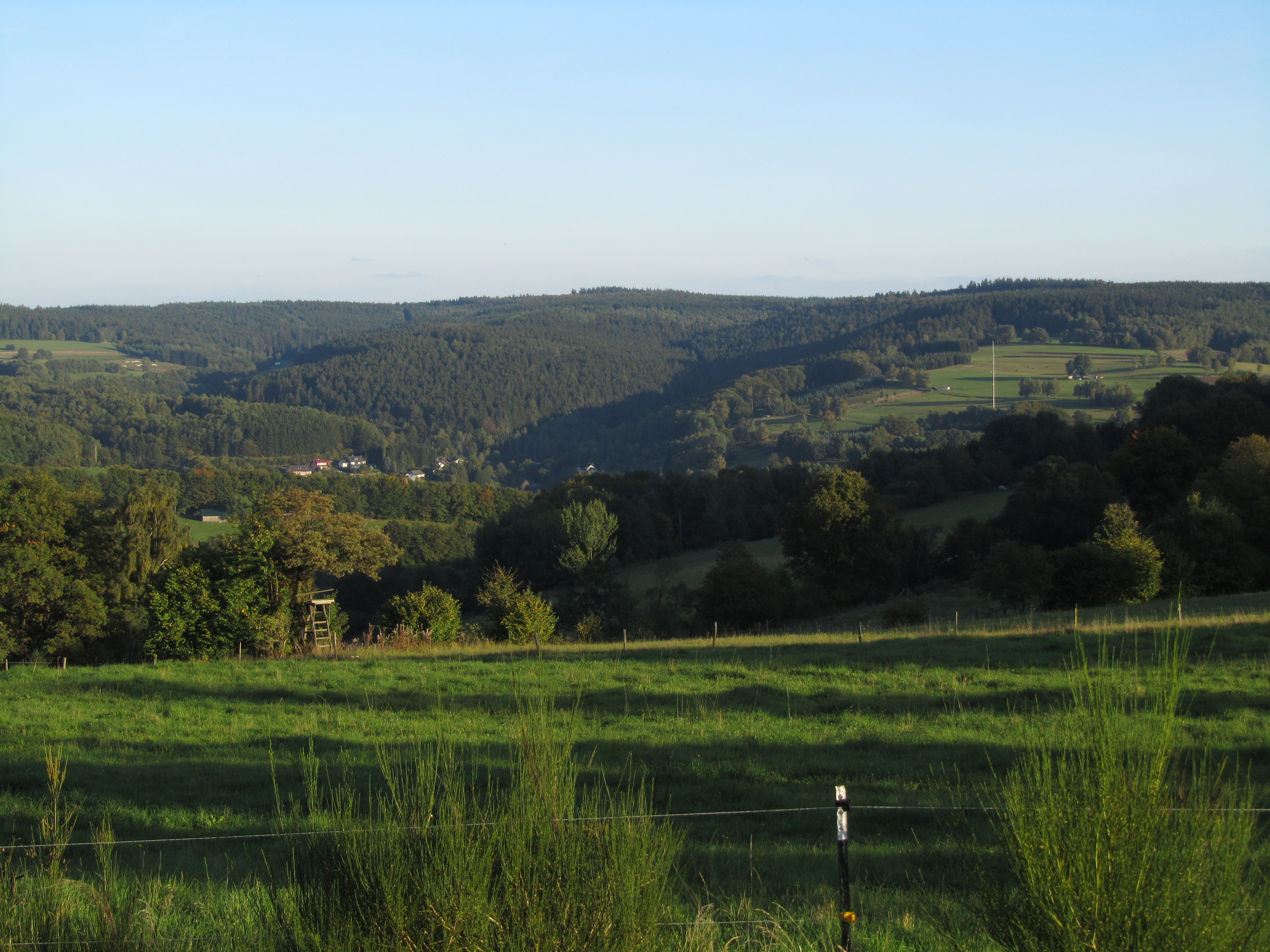
- Hermannskoppe seen from the northwest

Highest point
- Elevation: 567 m (1,860 ft)
- Coordinates: 50°06′26″N 9°31′0″E

Geography
- Location within Hesse
- Location: Hesse, Germany
- Parent range: Spessart

Hermannskoppe is a hill of Hesse, Germany. Its peak is located in the municipality of Flörsbachtal and is, at 567 m above NHN, the highest elevation of the Hessian part of the Mittelgebirge Spessart. It lies right on the border with the state of Bavaria.

The hill is crossed by the historic road Birkenhainer Strasse which passes an old toll station nearby (Bayerische Schanz).
