= Birkenhainer Straße =

Long-distance hiking trail in Germany

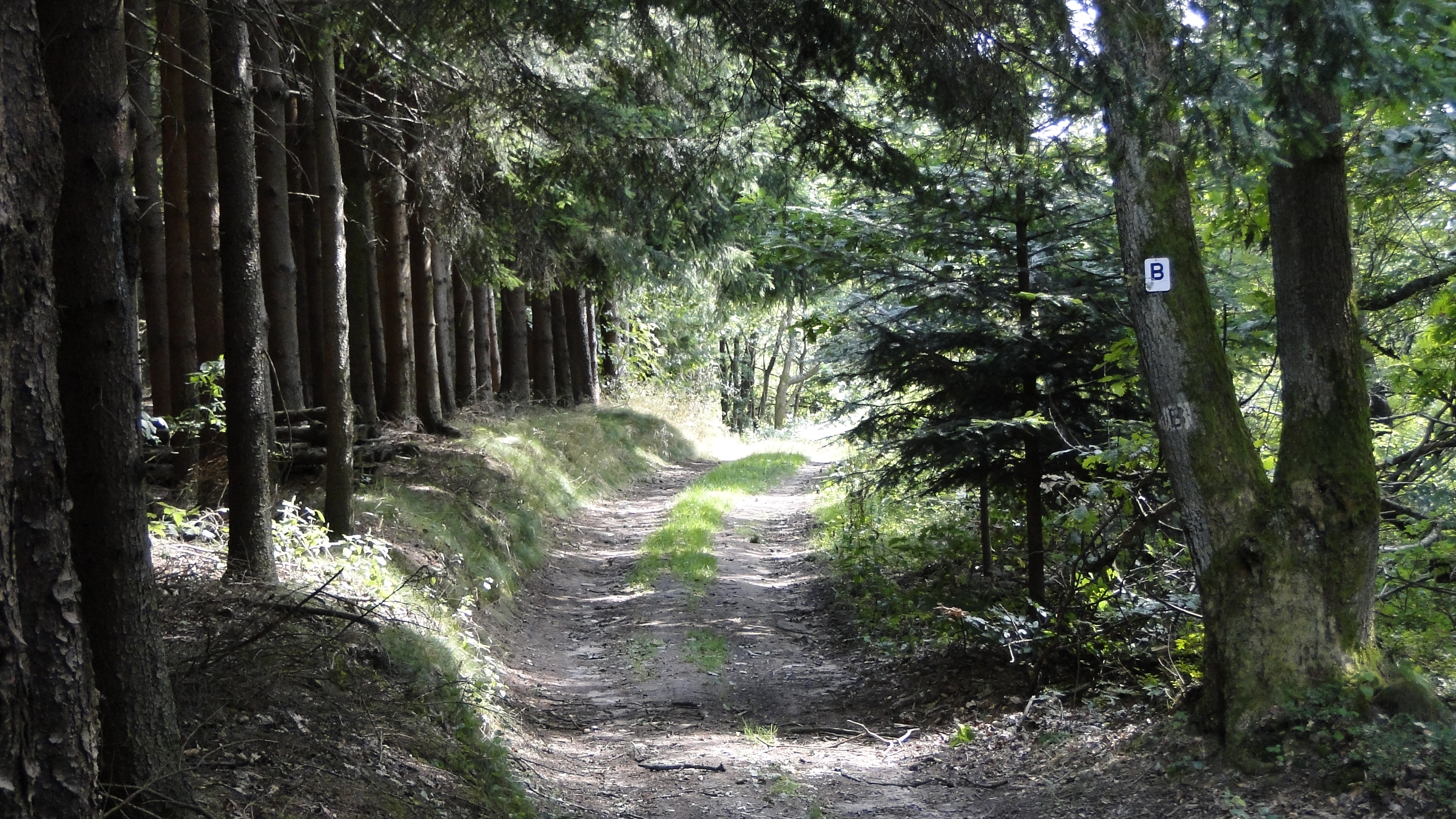
- Near Ruppertshütten, with waymark "B"
- Length: 71 km (44 mi)
- Location: Spessart Nature Park, Germany
- Trailheads: Hanau, Gemünden am Main, numerous places in between
- Use: Hiking
- Elevation gain/loss: 976 metres (3,200 ft) gain in; 947 metres (3,110 ft) gain out
- Highest point: c. 540 m above sea level (west of Bayrische Schanz)
- Lowest point: c. 130 m above sea level (western start)
- Waymark: black "B" on white
- Surface: natural paths (40%); gravel on forest roads (55%); some tarmac (5%)

Course of Birkenhainer Straße

The Birkenhainer Straße (English: Birkenhainer road) is a long-distance hiking trail that follows an ancient trade route through the Mittelgebirge Spessart, in the states of Hesse and Bavaria, Germany. It is 71 km long and leads from Hanau to Gemünden am Main, cutting across the so-called Mainviereck, a large loop of the river Main. The trail follows an ancient trade route which in the Middle Ages was an important road for moving troops and for long-distance trade. The Birkenhainer Straße was a part of the link between Nuremberg and Antwerp. Its origins may lie back as far as the Neolithic period. The name likely derives from a prominent copse of birch trees that used to exist near the road at Geiselbach (Hesse).

== History ==
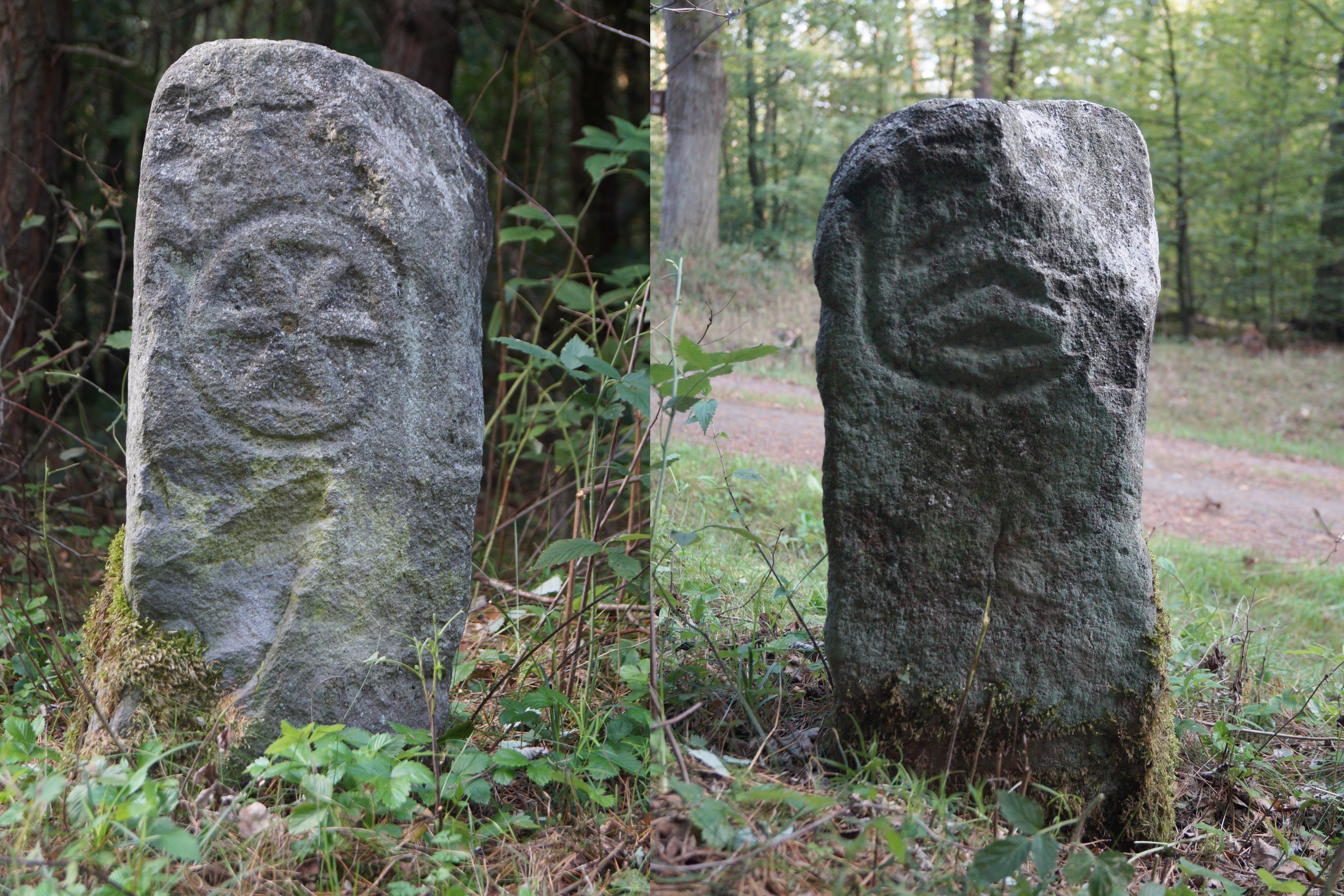
Border stone on the Birkenhainer Straße near Hanau-Neuwirtshaus, showing the Wheel of Mainz to the south and the Hanau chevron on the north side

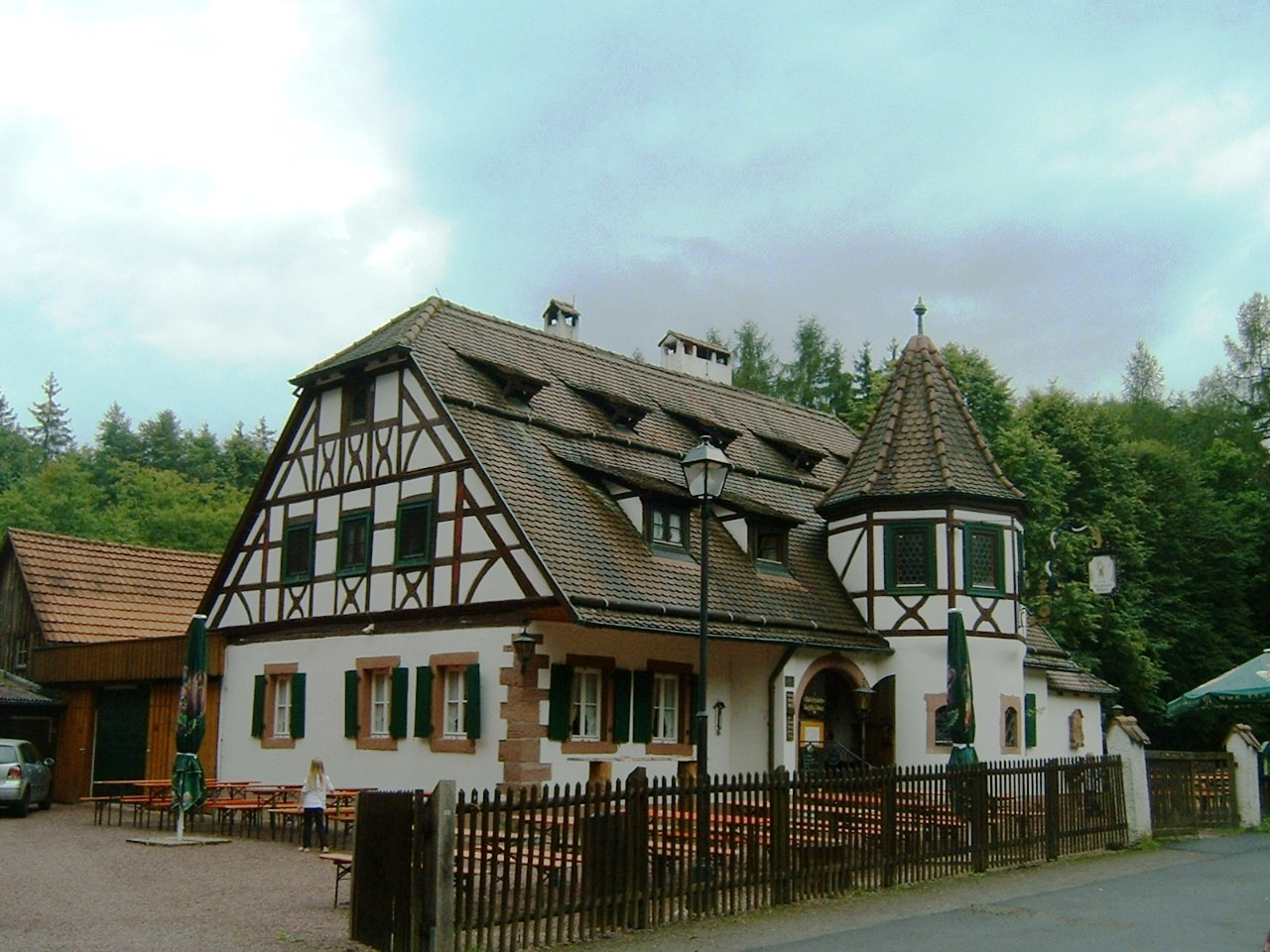
Bayrische Schanz, former border post and tavern

Nearby findings and burial sites from the Neolithic and circular ramparts from the Iron Age indicate that the historic road Birkenhainer Straße or at least an assortment of its paths was used that long ago. In the Middle Ages, it was an important link between Eastern Franconia and the Rhine-Main region (Rhenish-Franconia). Past Hanau, the route crossed the river Main at Steinheim and continued along its southern bank to Mainz. It was used by travelling Emperors like Frederick Barbarossa on his way to the Imperial Diet at Würzburg, as well as by military forces. Back then, the Birkenhainer Straße also served as an important trade route between Nuremberg and Antwerp and was used for cattle drives. It was used by the renowned wagon drivers from Frammersbach, who dominated long-distance trade along several key routes.

The Birkenhainer Straße was the subject of a symposium in 2014 organized by the Archäologisches Spessartprojekt which since 2012 has also conducted excavations at some points along the route.

The name Birkenhainer Straße likely derives from a copse of birch trees that stood near the village of Geiselbach, where several branches of the road meet to continue on together. The copse was referred to as Birkenhain in a document by the Abbey Seligenstadt dating from 1527.

== Route ==
The old road began at the mouth of the Kinzig. The modern hiking trail mostly follows the historic route (which in some places was not just a single path but several alternative routes) and crosses the Spessart as a high route. It avoids the valleys and keeps to the peaks and ridges, as climbing up and down the slopes was difficult and arduous with horse- or ox-drawn wagons. At the same time, the route was much shorter than following the valley of the Main river in its great loop south to Wertheim and Miltenberg and back up to Aschaffenburg and Hanau. The trail is maintained and signposted by the Spessartbund with a black "B" on white.

The trail starts at the Bundesstraße 8 not far from the Kleinkastell Neuwirtshaus, the remains of a small Roman fortification on the Limes Germanicus, located in the forests near Hanau. It then heads east to the boundary between the states of Hesse and Bavaria and largely follows it past Rodenbach, near the Hof Trages and Freigericht before leaving the borderline to continue eastward. The trail then leads through the outskirts of Geiselbach, the likely location of the birch copse that gave the road its name. At this point, several alternative routes met and continued onwards in a single direction. Heading north, the trail rejoins the Hessian–Bavarian border near Linsengericht and turns east again.

At the Dr.-Kihn-Platz (named after Karl Kihn), it joins another modern trail/historic route, the Eselsweg, and the two routes continue east together to Wiesbüttsee, an artificial lake, where the Birkenhainer Straße leaves the border. Near Flörsbach (Flörsbachtal) it crosses the Bundesstraße 276. Looping around the valley of Lohrhaupten (Flörsbachtal), it rejoins the border and continues along it southwards before entering Bavaria for good near the Bayrische Schanz (sconce), an old border post. The trail then goes almost directly east, passes Ruppertshütten (Lohr am Main) and the former location of Kloster Einsiedel (a Premonstratensian monastery). Past the Zollberg, named after a toll station between the territories of the Elector of Mainz and the Bishopric of Würzburg, the trail finally leads down into the Main valley at Langenprozelten and continues into Gemünden am Main where it terminates at the old town, east of the Franconian Saale.

== Gallery ==
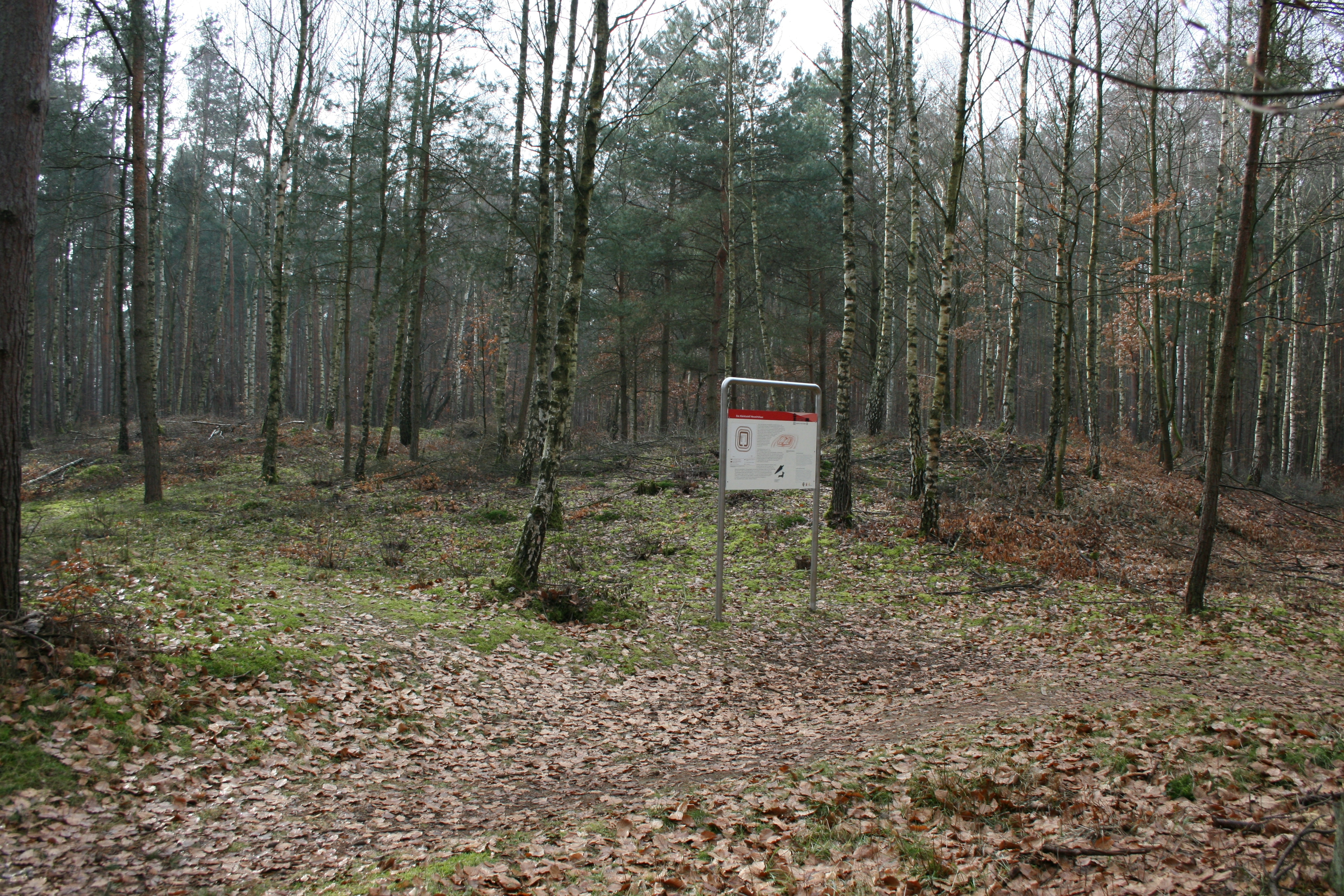
Remains of the Kleinkastell Neuwirtshaus, Roman fortification near the western start of the trail

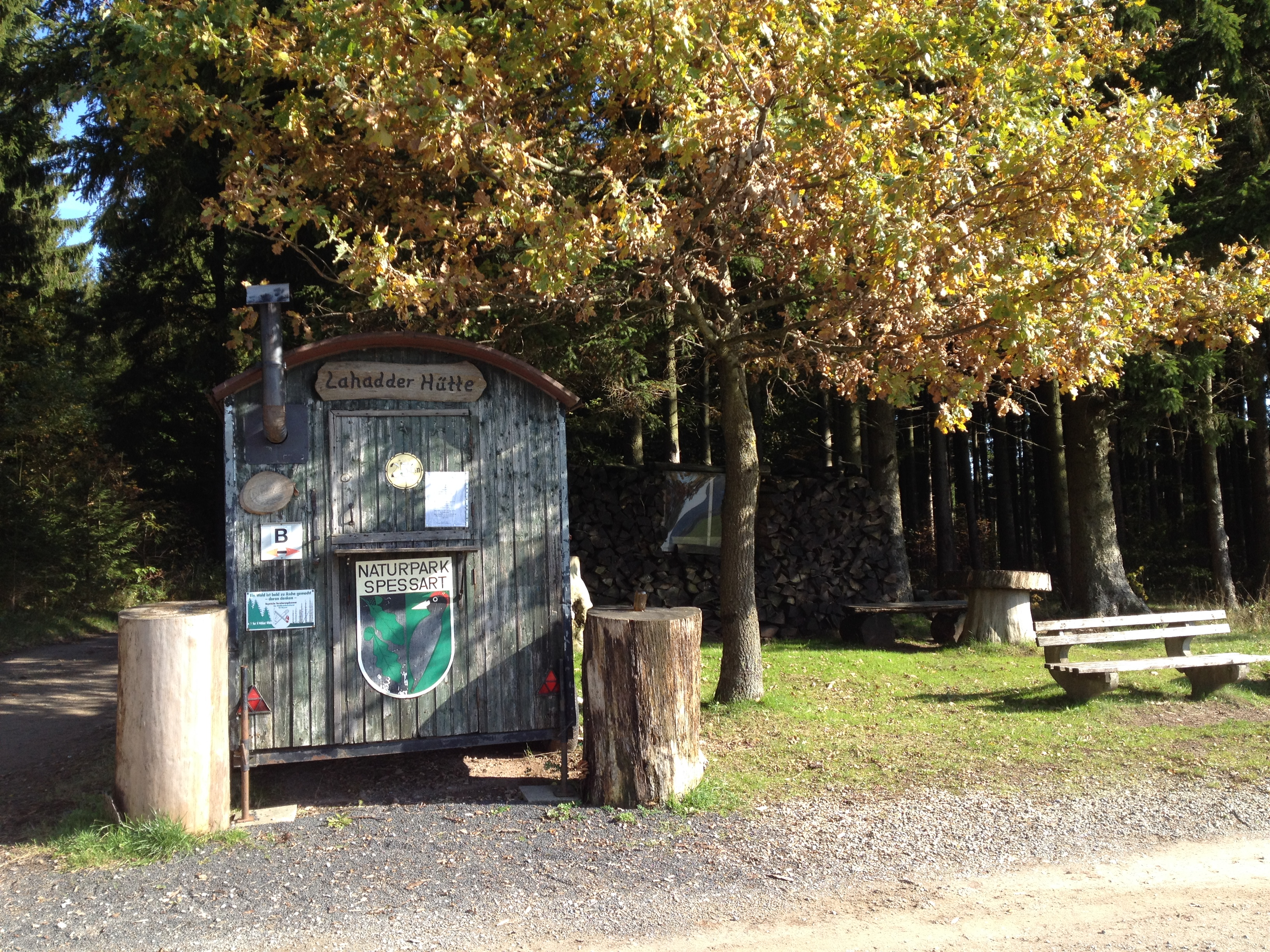
Near Lohrhaupten, a resting place for hikers

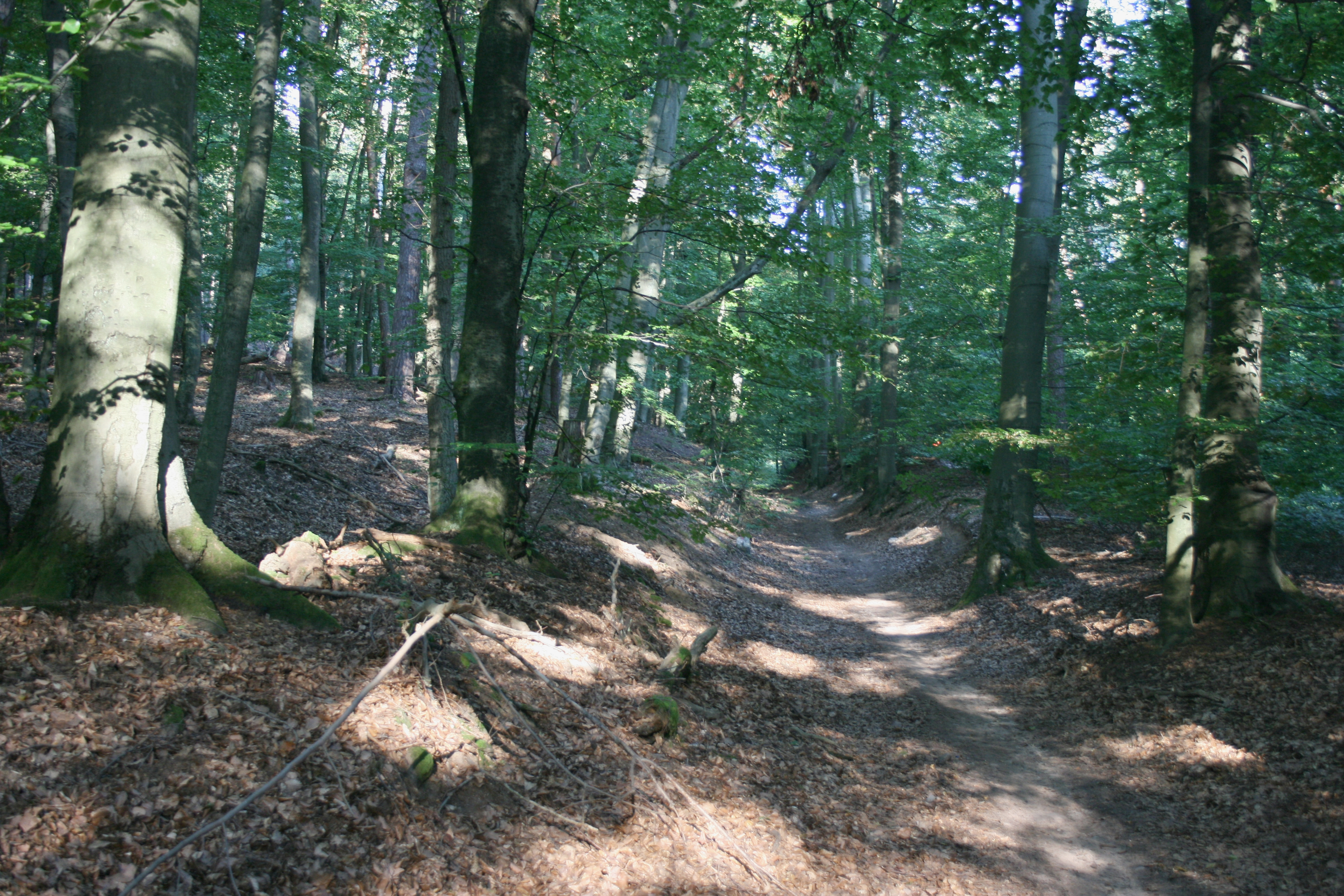
Sunken road northwest of Alzenau

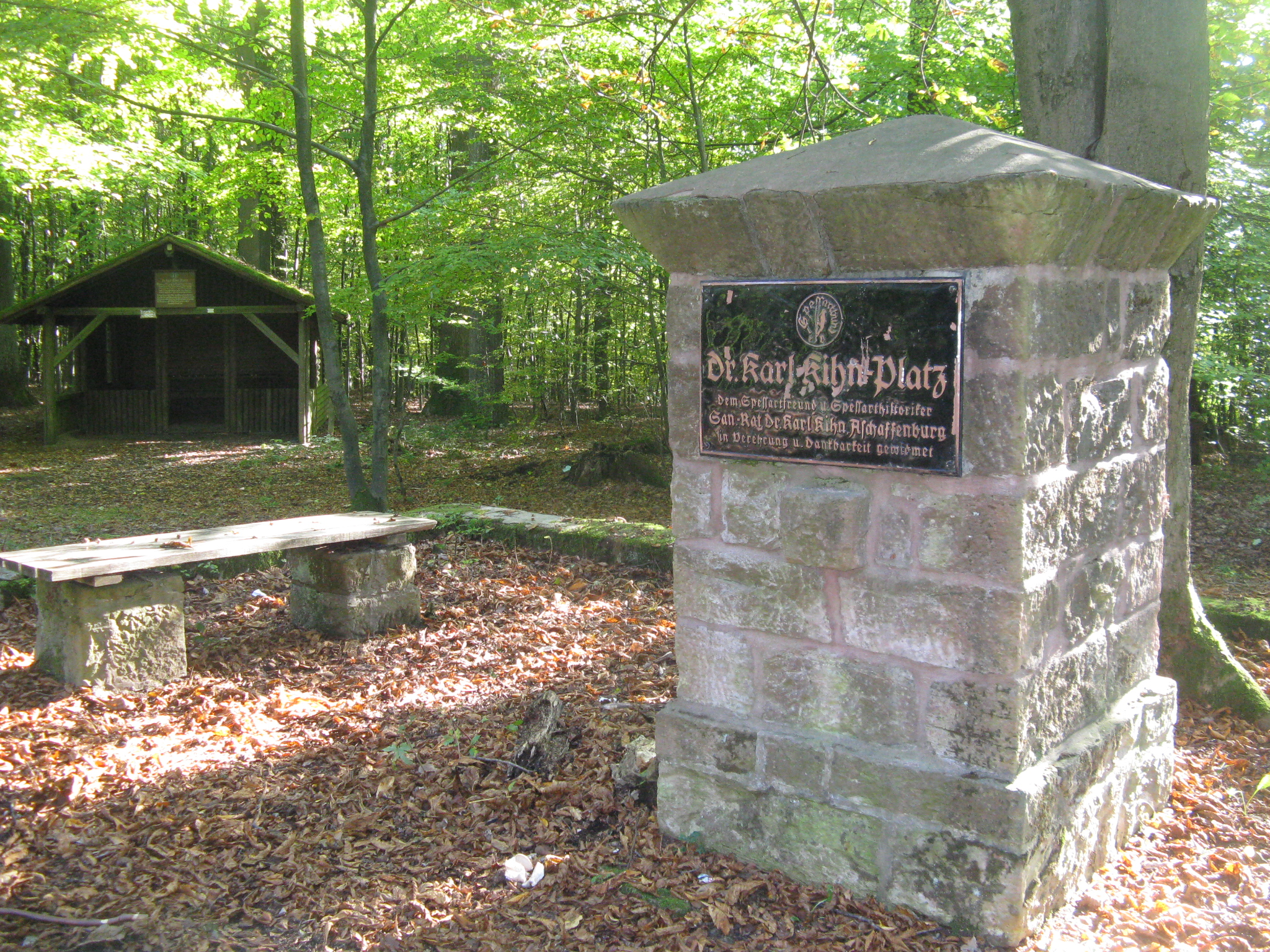
Dr.-Karl-Kihn-Platz

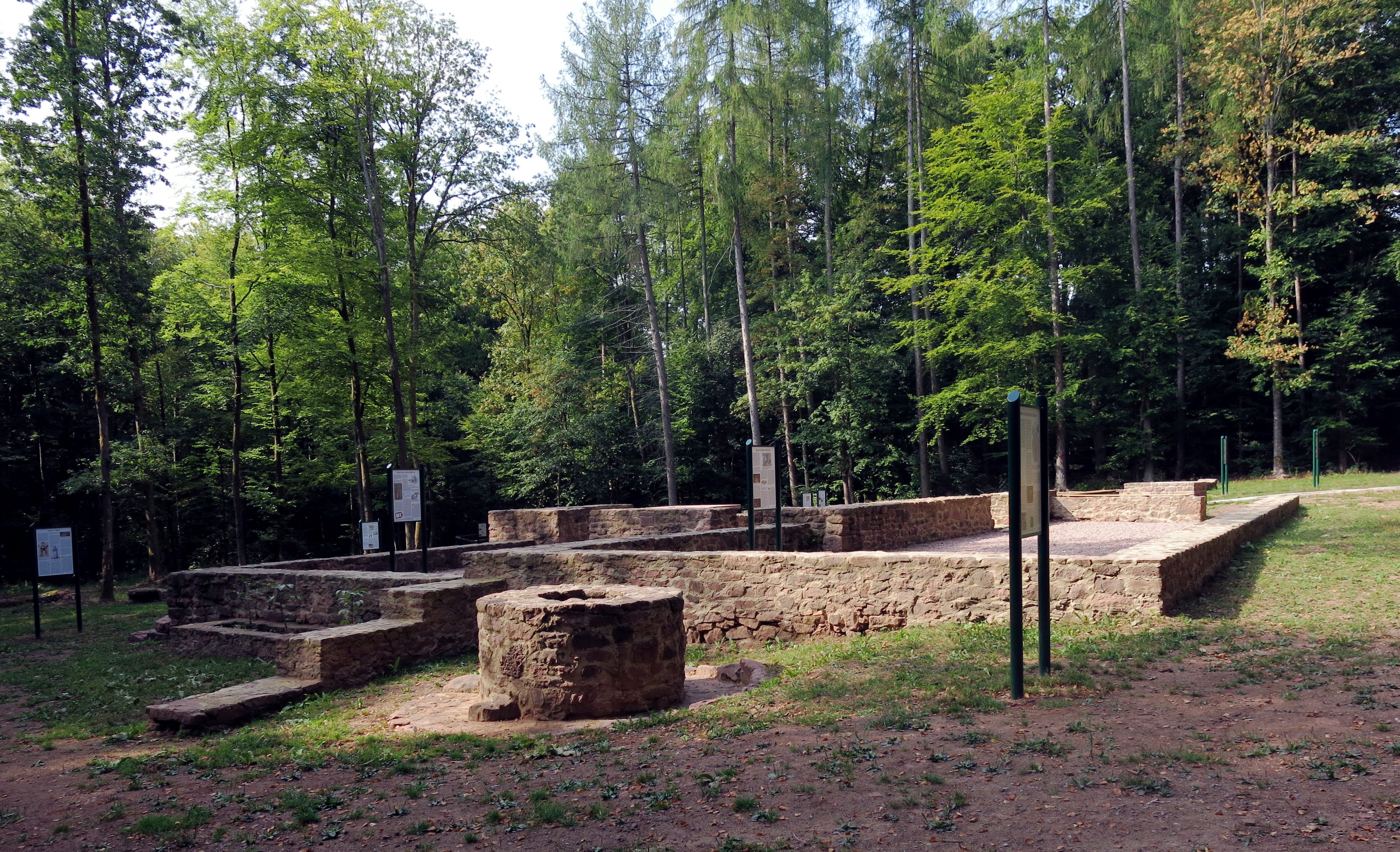
Ruins of Kloster Einsiedel (excavation 2018)
