= Flörsbach (Lohr) =

River in Germany

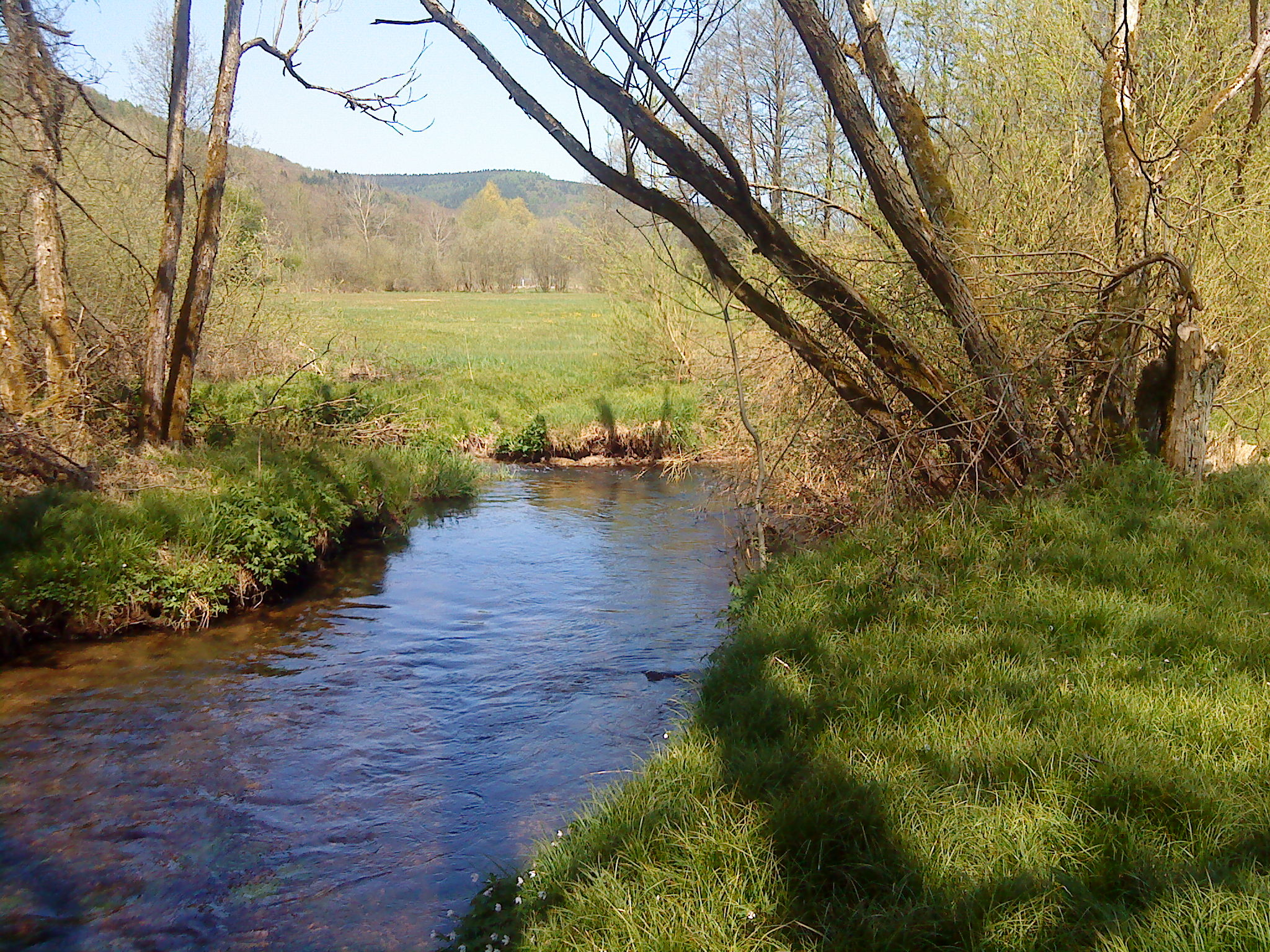
- Confluence of Flörsbach and Lohrbach

Location
- Country: Germany
- State: Hesse

Physical characteristics
- Source
  - location: near Flörsbach, an Ortsteil of Flörsbachtal
  - elevation: c. 400 m (1,300 ft) above sealevel
- Mouth
  - location: Joins Lohrbach to form the Lohr near Kempfenbrunn
  - coordinates: 50.1006°N 9.4600°E
  - elevation: 270 m (890 ft) above sealevel
- Length: 5.9 km (3.7 mi)
- Basin size: c. 15 km^{2} (5.8 sq mi)

Basin features
- Progression: Lohr→ Main→ Rhine→ North Sea

Flörsbach is a river in the municipality of Flörsbachtal in the Main-Kinzig district of Hesse, Germany.

== Course ==
The Flörsbach rises near the village of the same name from several springs and then mostly flows southeast, parallel to the Bundesstrasse 276, through Kempfenbrunn and then joins with the Lohrbach to form the Lohr.

== See also ==
- List of rivers of Hesse
- Spessart
