= Lohr (river) =

River in Germany

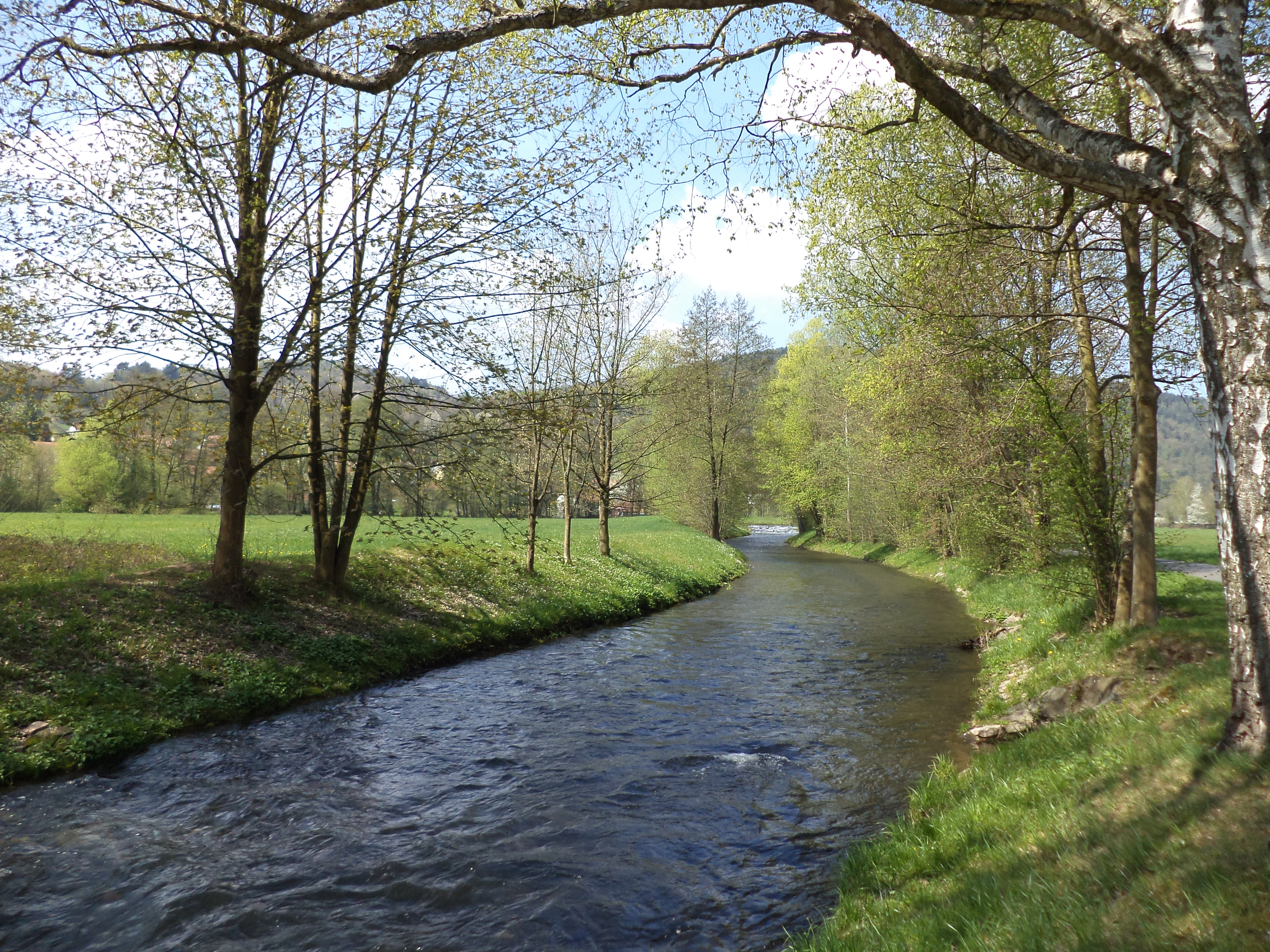
- The Lohr at Lohr am Main

Location
- Country: Germany
- States: Bavaria and Hesse

Physical characteristics
- Source
  - location: confluence of Flörsbach (right) and the Lohrbach (left) south of Lohrhaupten
  - elevation: 270 m (890 ft) above sea level at the confluence
- Mouth
  - location: Lohr am Main into the Main
  - coordinates: 49.9947°N 9.5810°E
  - elevation: 147 m (482 ft) above sea level
- Length: 18.6 km (11.6 mi)(23.0 km or 14.3 mi including Lohrbach)
- Basin size: 235.9 km^{2} (91.1 sq mi)

Basin features
- Progression: Main→ Rhine→ North Sea
- Tributaries
  - left: Sperkelbach, Rinderbach, Linderbach, Roßbach, Lehngrundbach, Unterer Auwiesengraben
  - right: Laubersbach, Aubach

Lohr (German pronunciation: [loːɐ̯]) is a right tributary of the Main in Germany. Although its origins lie in the Main-Kinzig district of Hessen, most of the course of the Lohr is in the Main-Spessart district of Bavaria. Including its source river Lohrbach, it is 23.0 km long.

== Course ==
The Lohr is created by the confluence of the Flörsbach (right) and the Lohrbach (left). Around 1 km below the confluence, the Lohr enters Bavaria. It then flows south to Frammersbach, southeast to Partenstein and continues to Lohr am Main where it discharges into the Main.

== See also ==
- List of rivers of Bavaria
- List of rivers in Hesse
- Spessart
