= Flörsbachtal =

- Municipality
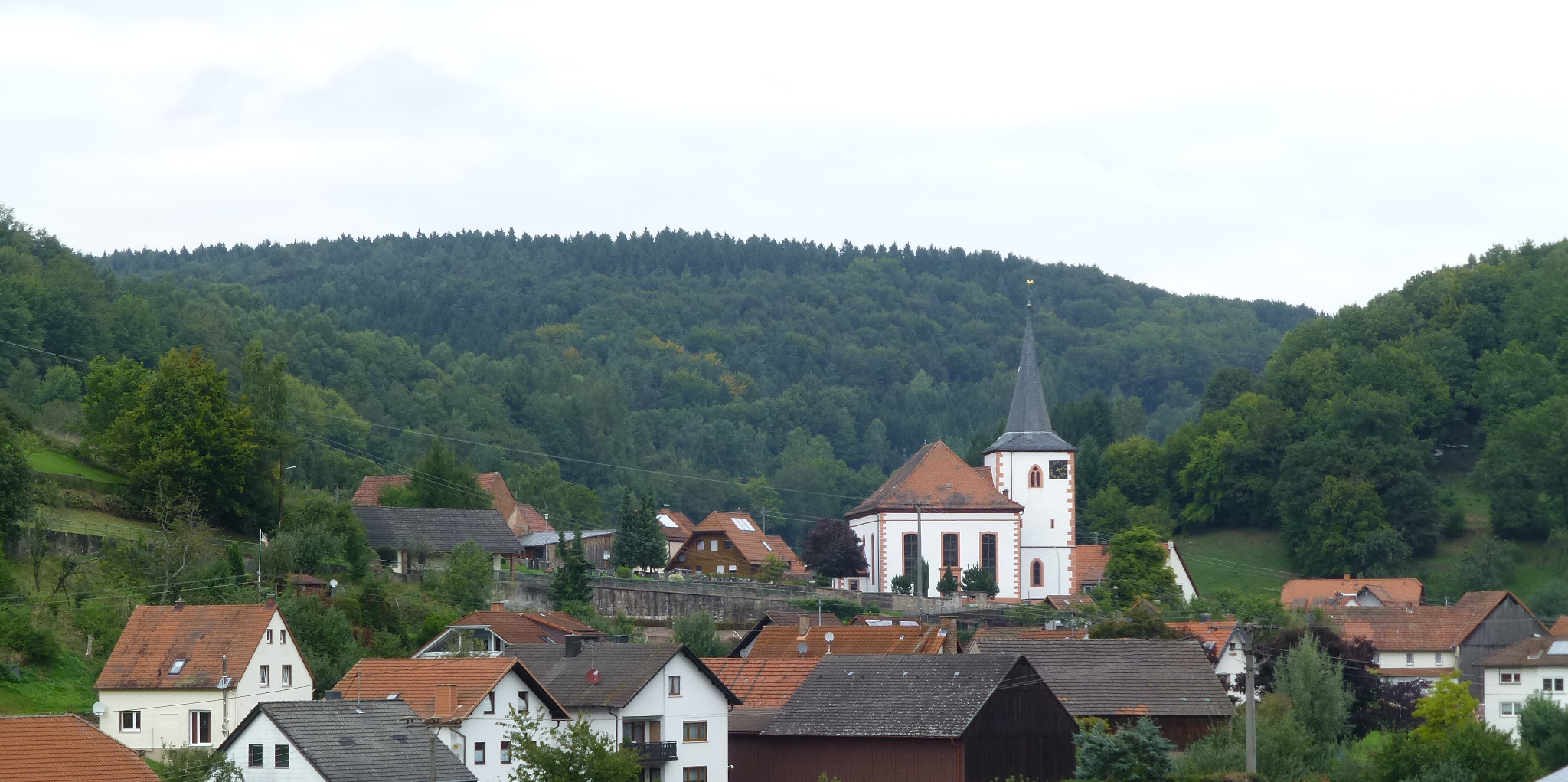
- Flörsbachtal, Ortsteil Lohrhaupten

- Coat of arms

- Location of Flörsbachtal within Main-Kinzig-Kreis district
- Interactive map of Flörsbachtal
- Location within Germany Location within Hesse
- Coordinates: 50°07′N 09°26′E
- Country: Germany
- State: Hesse
- Admin. region: Darmstadt
- District: Main-Kinzig-Kreis
- Subdivisions: 4 districts

Government
  - Mayor (2023–29): Sibylle Hergert (SPD)

Area
  - Total: 52.11 km^{2} (20.12 sq mi)

Population (2025-12-31)
  - Total: 2,296
  - Density: 44.06/km^{2} (114.1/sq mi)
- Time zone: UTC+01:00 (CET)
  - Summer (DST): UTC+02:00 (CEST)
- Postal codes: 63639
- Dialling codes: 06057
- Vehicle registration: MKK, GN, SLÜ
- Website: www.floersbachtal.de

Flörsbachtal is a municipality in the Main-Kinzig district, in Hesse, Germany. It has a population close to 2,400. Flösbachtal contains both the oldest parish and the youngest settlement established in the Spessart hills. Located within the municipal territory is the Hermannskoppe, the highest elevation in the Hessian part of the Spessart and the Wiesbüttmoor, a rare hanging bog.

== Etymology ==
The community Flörsbachtal was newly created in 1972 and is named after the Flörsbach, a stream that flows into the Lohrbach, the name of the upper part of the Lohr which flows into the Main at Lohr am Main.

== Geography ==
=== Location ===
Flörsbachtal is located in the far south of the Main-Kinzig district of Hesse, right next to the state of Bavaria, which surrounds the community on three sides (west, south and east). Flörsbachtal lies in the wooded hills of the Spessart.

Around 75% of the municipal territory is covered by forests. It also includes the nature preserve Wiesbüttmoor, a rare hanging bog and Wiesbüttsee, a small artificial lake created for mining operations, ca. 1760. The moor came into being in the later 18th century as the water dammed at the lake turned the woods upstream into bog land. Until the mid-19th century the surrounding hills, deforested during mining operations, were mostly covered in heather. Today they have been reclaimed by forest. Wiesbüttmoor has been a nature preserve since 1953.

Other locations in Flörsbachtal include the Bergfeld, an agricultural area in a clearing mostly surrounded by forest and the hill Wellersberg. The hill Hermannskoppe, the highest point in the Hessian part of the Spessart and over which runs the Bavarian-Hessian border, is also located in the municipal territory.

=== Subdivisions ===
Constituent communities

Flörsbachtal has the followings Ortsteile (originally independent villages, population numbers for 2011):

- Flörsbach (636)
- Kempfenbrunn (655)
- Lohrhaupten (1,057)
- Mosborn (76)

The seat of the municipal administration is in Lohrhaupten.

=== Neighbouring communities ===
The neighbouring communities are from the north (clockwise): Biebergemünd, Jossgrund, the unincorporated area Forst Aura, Fellen and finally the unincorporated areas Ruppertshüttener Forst, Frammersbacher Forst and Schöllkrippener Forst. On the Bavarian side, the neighbouring districts are the Main-Spessart district and the Landkreis Aschaffenburg.

== History ==
The ancient trading route Birkenhainer Strasse passes through the municipality to the east and north of Lohrhaupten and then west to the north of Flörsbach. The Eselsweg, another trading route, also passes through, in the northwest, near Flörsbach. Likely in use since prehistoric times, by the early Middle Ages these two routes, which meet near the area known as Wiesbütt, had become of great strategic and logistical importance.

=== Flörsbach ===
Around 980, a description of the Aschaffenburg forest mentioned a Fleredesfelt which may be interpreted to refer to the Flörsbacher Höhe, an elevation to the east of the village, or a nearby settlement. In 1374, Flörsbach was owned by the Lords of Hanau (Amt Schwarzenfeld). When mining flourished at nearby Biebergemünd, many people from Flörsbach found employment there.

Prior to becoming a part of Hanau, the village had been a fief of the Archbishop of Mainz given to the Counts of Rieneck, who administered it as part of the Zent Frammersbach. When the Archbishop tried to recover it during an inheritance conflict in 1339, a court awarded the area to Hanau.

In 1633, Flörsbach had 170 and in 1820 195 inhabitants.

=== Lohrhaupten ===
Lohrhaupten, named after the "head" of the Lohr stream, was first mentioned as a parish in a document from 1057, making this the oldest parish in the Spessart region still in existence today or about which any information is known. The parish was controlled by the Archbishop of Mainz. In 1184 it was mentioned as a possession of the Stift St. Peter und Alexander at Aschaffenburg. Besides serving as an outpost against the territory of rival Fulda Abbey, Lohrhaupten also was a post on the Birkenhainer Strasse.

Half of the village was given as a fief to the Counts of Rieneck by Mainz, but by 1333 at the latest it had been transferred by marriage or as inheritance to the Lords of Hanau. The other half of the village remained with Mainz until 1684. The Patronat of the Aschaffenburg Stift ended in 1607 and Mainz took over. In 1559, Reformation had been introduced.

In 1684 all of Lohrhaupten came to the Counts of Hanau. Losing its strategic value, the village became a backwater.

=== Kempfenbrunn ===
Kempfenbrunn was first mentioned in 1324. It had been the property of the Counts of Rieneck since c. 1300 and in 1324 they mortgaged it to Schlüchtern Abbey.

In the 17th century, glass production became an important industry in the area and by the 18th century an official Glashütte, run for the Counts of Hanau, was established at Laubersbachtal (in production 1722–49).

=== Mosborn ===
Mosborn is the most recent settlement, not just in the municipality but in all of the Spessart. It was only established in 1768, following a 1765 declaration by Wilhelm, the then heir apparent of Hanau, who was trying to stop the wave of emigration by the impoverished population.

=== Overall history since 1787 ===
From 1787, all the villages of Flörsbachtal belonged to the Amt Lohrhaupten of the Grafschaft Hanau-Münzenberg, which in 1736 had become a part of the Landgraviate of Hesse-Kassel. From 1806/7 to 1810, the territory was occupied by French troops and thus came to the Fürstentum Hanau of the Empire of France. The seat of the Amt (a military administration) was at Bieber. In 1810, the Grand Duchy of Frankfurt was established as another client state of France and the villages became part of its Departement Hanau, Distrikt Bieber. After the French were driven out, the area came to the Electorate of Hesse (Amt Bieber). In 1821, the Landkreis Gelnhausen was established. In 1848, the area came to the Bezirk Hanau and in 1851 the Kreis Gelnhausen (all part of the Electorate). In 1867, the area became Prussian, part of the province of Hesse-Nassau, Landkreis Gelnhausen.

=== Creation of the current municipality ===
Flörsbachtal was created during Gebietsreform from the formerly independent villages Flörsbach, Kempfenbrunn and Mosborn on 1 April 1972. On 1 July 1974, Lohrhaupten joined.

In 1974, the Landkreis Gelnhausen was abolished and the municipality became part of the Main-Kinzig district.

== Attractions ==
Besides the nature preserves, hiking and biking facilities of the surrounding forests, the villages also offer a few historic buildings:

- St. Matthäus - the tower of the church in Lohrhaupten dates from the 15th century, the late-Baroque nave was built after a fire in 1765.
- St. Marien - Protestant church at Kempfenbrunn, late Gothic tower with frescoes, 18th-century statues of saints
- Medieval church at Flörsbach - the altar was removed and is today in the museum of the University of Marburg, it is thought to have been made by the workshop of Tillmann Riemenschneider

== Infrastructure ==
=== Transportation ===
Bundesstrasse 276 passes through the municipality, connecting it to the Autobahn 66 in the northwest and Lohr in the southeast.

=== Utilities ===
Like in other communities in the area, such as Biebergemünd, Bad Orb and Jossgrund, there is currently controversy over plans to build towering wind farms on the wooded peaks around Flörsbachtal. Environmentalists and many locals reject these plans due to the destruction of forests and animal habitats, possible health risks to residents, as well as threats to local property values and, in particular, to the tourism business as a result of a declining attractiveness of the region to visitors. It is also questioned whether local winds are strong and constant enough to allow economical operation of the wind farms.
