= Königheim =

- Municipality
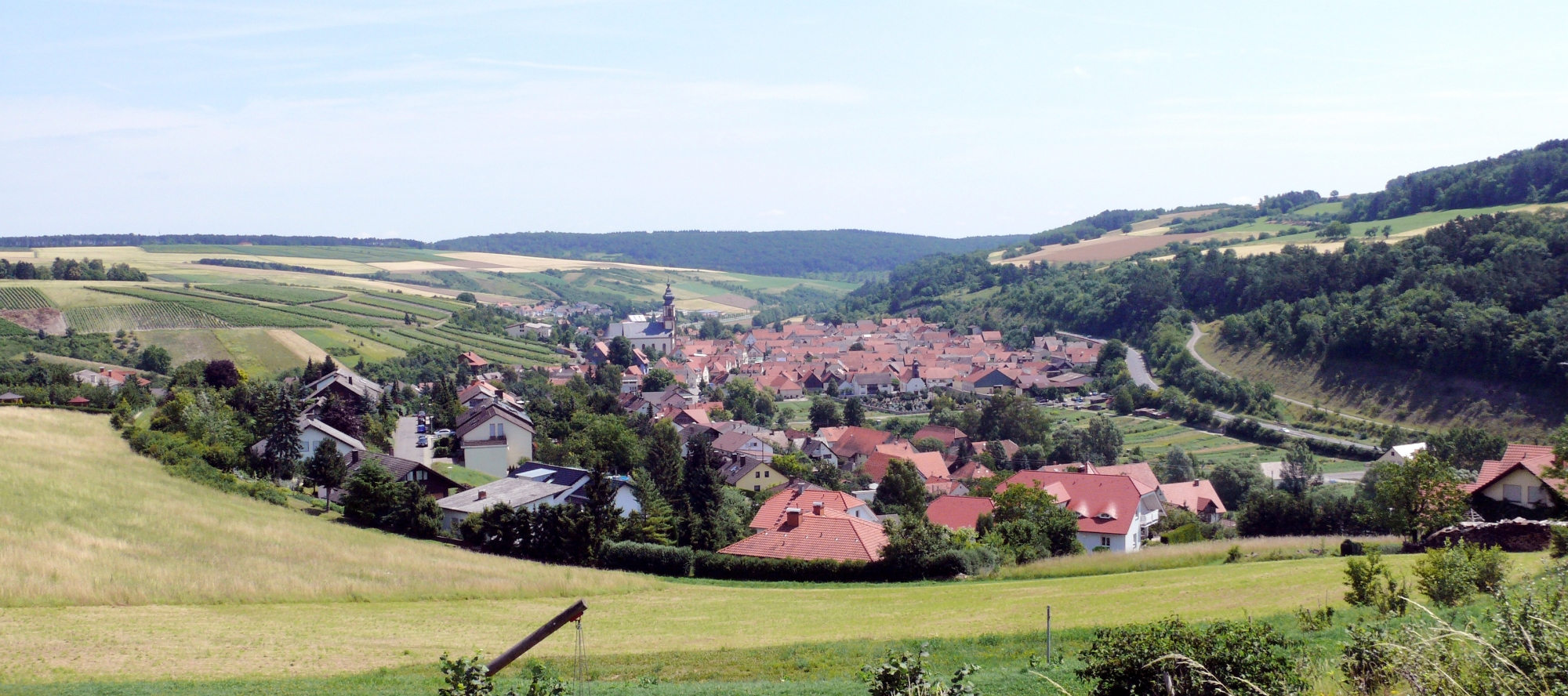
- Königheim

- Coat of arms

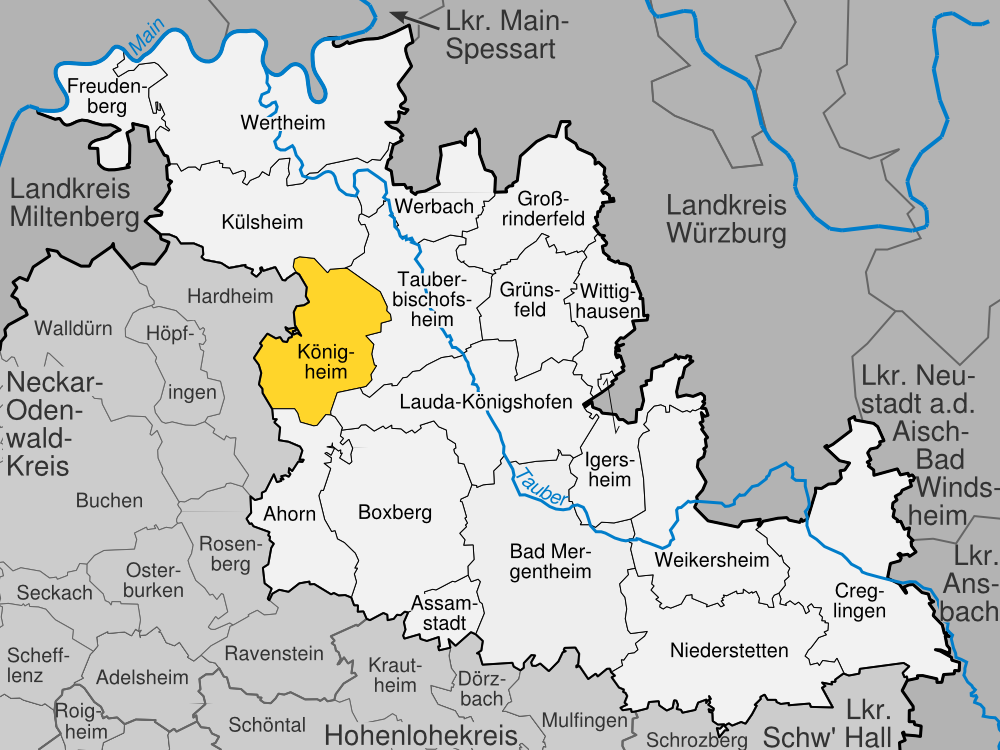
- Location of Königheim within Main-Tauber-Kreis district
- Interactive map of Königheim
- Location within Germany Location within Baden-Württemberg
- Coordinates: 49°37′04″N 09°35′44″E
- Country: Germany
- State: Baden-Württemberg
- Admin. region: Stuttgart
- District: Main-Tauber-Kreis

Government
  - Mayor (2016–24): Ludger Krug (Ind.)

Area
  - Total: 61.23 km^{2} (23.64 sq mi)
- Elevation: 223 m (732 ft)

Population (2025-12-31)
  - Total: 3,005
  - Density: 49.08/km^{2} (127.1/sq mi)
- Time zone: UTC+01:00 (CET)
  - Summer (DST): UTC+02:00 (CEST)
- Postal codes: 97953
- Dialling codes: 09341 und 09340
- Vehicle registration: TBB
- Website: www.koenigheim.de

Königheim (German pronunciation: [ˈkøːnɪçˌhaɪ̯m]) is a country town in the district of Main-Tauber in Baden-Württemberg in Germany. It consists of the villages Brehmen, Gissigheim, Königheim, and Pülfringen.

The oldest historic relic is a Celtic Viereckschanze or Nemeton.

== Demographics ==
Population development:

Year	Inhabitants
2011	3,194
2013	3,125
2015	3,022
2017	3,035
2019	3,005
2021	2,983
