= Rohrbach (Felchbach) =

River of Bavaria

Location
- Country: Germany
- States: Bavaria

Physical characteristics
- Mouth
  - location: Felchbach
  - coordinates: 49.0725°N 11.0364°E

Basin features
- Progression: Felchbach→ Swabian Rezat→ Rednitz→ Regnitz→ Main→ Rhine→ North Sea
- Tributaries
  - left: Stickelgraben

Rohrbach is a small river of Bavaria, Germany. It is a left tributary of the Felchbach near Ettenstatt.

== See also ==
- List of rivers of Bavaria
