= Igelsbach =

River in Germany

Location
- Country: Germany
- State: Bavaria

Physical characteristics
- Mouth
  - location: Igelsbachsee
  - coordinates: 49.1534°N 10.8741°E

Basin features
- Progression: Brombach→ Swabian Rezat→ Rednitz→ Regnitz→ Main→ Rhine→ North Sea
- Tributaries
  - right: Eilenbach

Igelsbach is a small river of Bavaria, Germany. Near Absberg, it flows into the Igelsbachsee, a forebay of the Großer Brombachsee.

== See also ==
- List of rivers of Bavaria
