= Klingenbach (Igelsbach) =

Location
- Country: Germany
- State: Bavaria

Physical characteristics
- Mouth
  - location: Igelsbach
  - coordinates: 49.1590°N 10.8541°E

Basin features
- Progression: Igelsbach→ Brombach→ Swabian Rezat→ Rednitz→ Regnitz→ Main→ Rhine→ North Sea

Klingenbach (German pronunciation: [ˈklɪŋənbax]) is a river of Bavaria, Germany. It is a left tributary of the Igelsbach.

== See also ==
- List of rivers of Bavaria
