= Zandtbach =

River in Germany

- The Zandtbach west of Weidenmühle (a part of Lichtenau)

- Mouth of the Zandtbach

Location
- Country: Germany
- State: Bavaria

Physical characteristics
- Mouth
  - location: Franconian Rezat
  - coordinates: 49.2690°N 10.7494°E
- Length: 8.9 km (5.5 mi)

Basin features
- Progression: Franconian Rezat→ Rednitz→ Regnitz→ Main→ Rhine→ North Sea

Zandtbach is a river of Bavaria, Germany. It flows into the Franconian Rezat east of Lichtenau.

== See also ==
- List of rivers of Bavaria
