= Pfofeld =

- Municipality
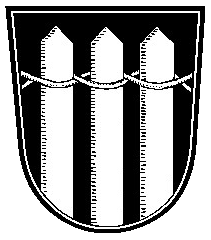
- Coat of arms

- Location of Pfofeld within Weißenburg-Gunzenhausen district
- Interactive map of Pfofeld
- Location within Germany Location within Bavaria
- Coordinates: 49°7′N 10°50′E
- Country: Germany
- State: Bavaria
- Admin. region: Mittelfranken
- District: Weißenburg-Gunzenhausen
- Municipal assoc.: Gunzenhausen
- Subdivisions: 4 Ortsteile: Langlau/Rehenbühl, Pfofeld, Thannhausen, Gundelshalm

Government
  - Mayor (2020–26): Reinhold Huber

Area
  - Total: 23.88 km^{2} (9.22 sq mi)
- Elevation: 446 m (1,463 ft)

Population (2025-12-31)
  - Total: 1,454
  - Density: 60.89/km^{2} (157.7/sq mi)
- Time zone: UTC+01:00 (CET)
  - Summer (DST): UTC+02:00 (CEST)
- Postal codes: 91738
- Dialling codes: 09834
- Vehicle registration: WUG
- Website: www.pfofeld.de

Pfofeld is a municipality in the Weißenburg-Gunzenhausen district, in Franconia, Germany.

== Geography ==
=== Location ===
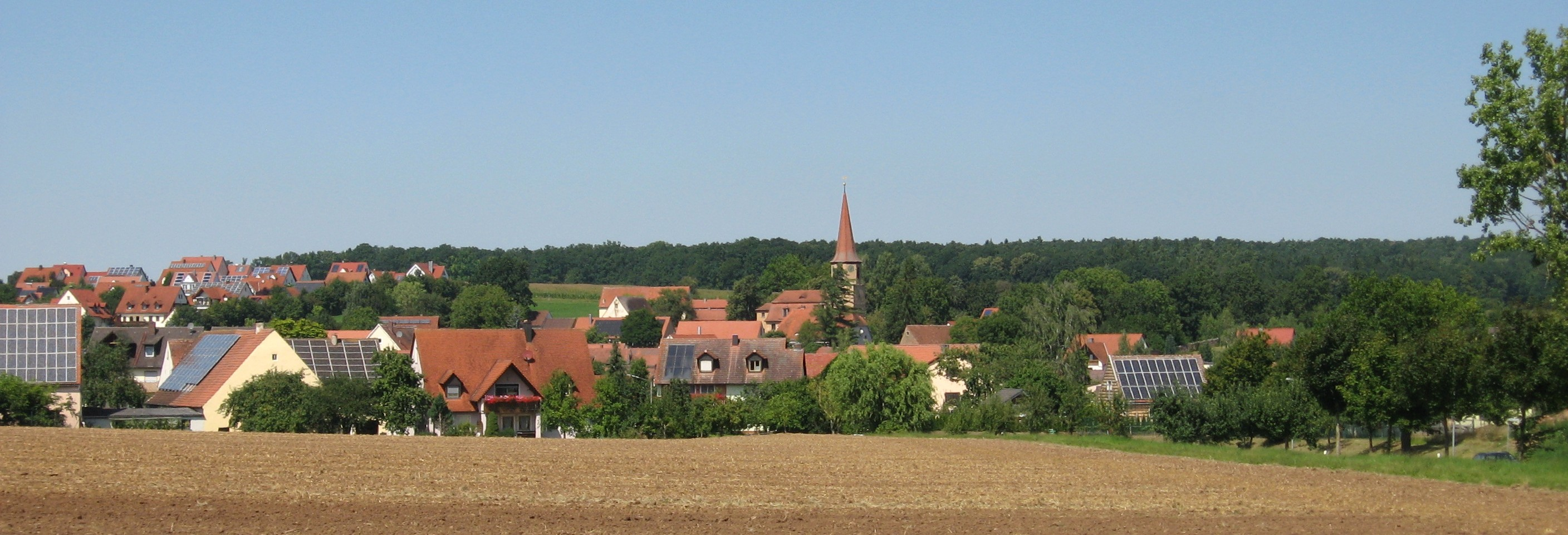
Pfofeld from the south

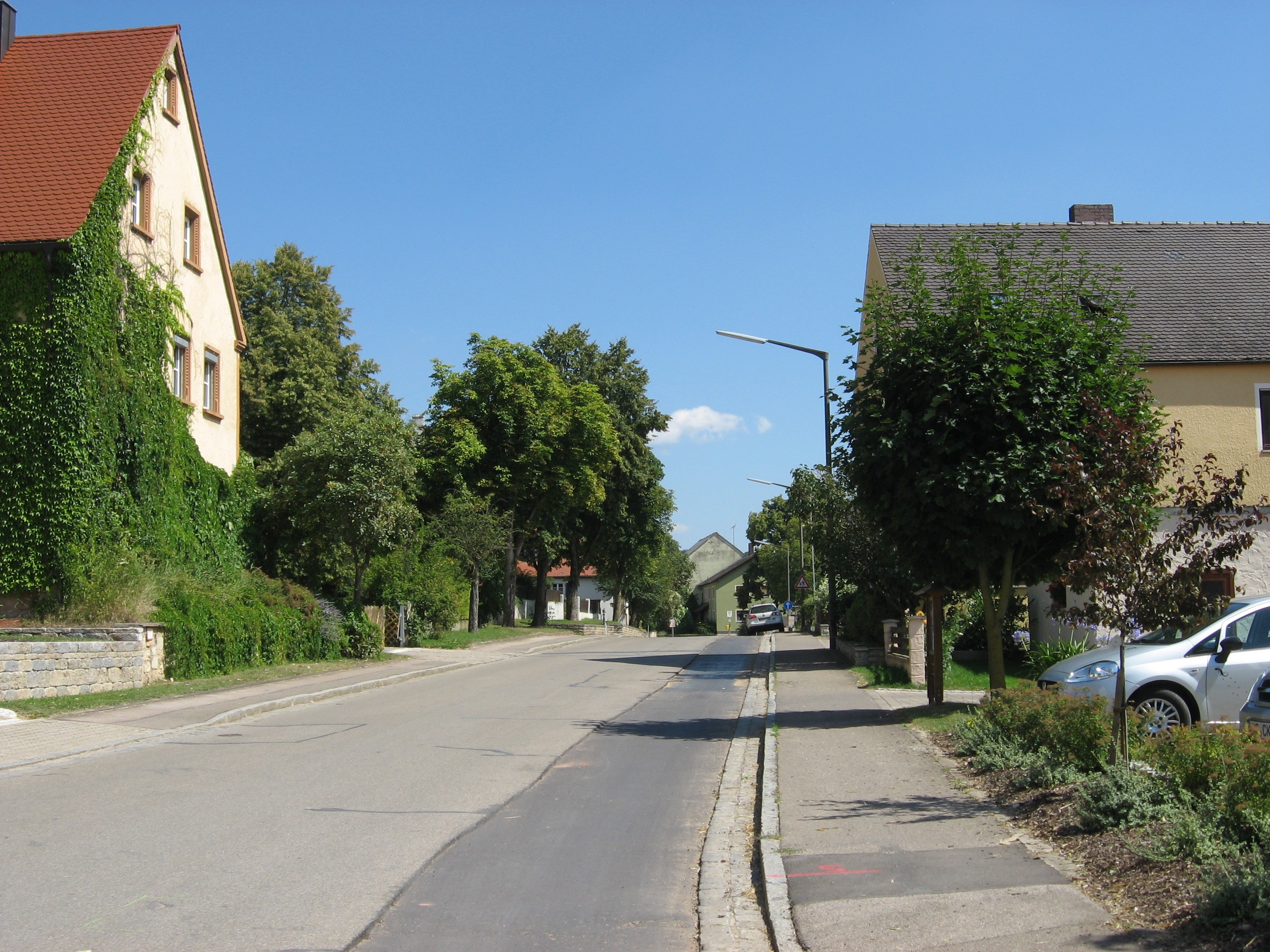
Inside Pfofeld

Pfofeld lies in the West Middle Franconia region, about five kilometres east of Gunzenhausen. In the north of the municipality are parts of the Großer Brombachsee and its forebay, the Kleiner Brombachsee, as well as the Altmühlüberleiter channel. In Roman times the limes ran through the area. The European watershed runs through the municipality and divides the catchments of the Rhine and Danube. A stream, the Dornhauser Mühlbach flows through Pfofeld; other local streams include the Bachwiesengraben, the Buxbach and the Brombach. The municipality is characterised by low hills and woods, including the Weißenberg and the Gräfensteinberg Forest. Staatsstraße 2222 runs past Pfofeld to the north. Within the municipality are the nature reserves of Brombachmoor and Halbinsel im Kleinen Brombachsee.

=== Administrative subdivisions ===
Pfofeld has thirteen subdivisions:

- Beutelmühle
- Furthmühle
- Grafenmühle
- Gundelshalm
- Hühnermühle
- Langlau
- Neuherberg
- Neumühle
- Pfofeld
- Rehenbühl
- Scheermühle
- Sorghof
- Thannhausen
