= Walkerszeller Bach =

River in Germany

Location
- Country: Germany
- State: Bavaria

Physical characteristics
- Mouth
  - location: Banzerbach
  - coordinates: 49.1037°N 10.9527°E

Basin features
- Progression: Banzerbach→ Swabian Rezat→ Rednitz→ Regnitz→ Main→ Rhine→ North Sea

The Walkerszeller Bach is a river in Bavaria, Germany. It flows into the Banzerbach west of Pleinfeld.

== See also ==
- List of rivers of Bavaria
