= Vorderer Troppelgraben =

River in Germany

Location
- Country: Germany
- State: Bavaria

Physical characteristics
- Mouth
  - location: Swabian Rezat
  - coordinates: 49.0845°N 10.9635°E

Basin features
- Progression: Swabian Rezat→ Rednitz→ Regnitz→ Main→ Rhine→ North Sea

Vorderer Troppelgraben is a river of Bavaria, Germany. It is a left tributary of the Swabian Rezat near Pleinfeld.

== See also ==
- List of rivers of Bavaria
