= Ottmarsfelder Graben =

River in Germany

Location
- Country: Germany
- State: Bavaria

Physical characteristics
- Source
  - location: between Fiegenstall and Ottmarsfeld
  - coordinates: 49°4′49″N 11°0′19″E
- Mouth
  - location: before Zollmühle in the Swabian Rezat
  - coordinates: 49°4′49″N 10°58′7″E
- Length: 3 km (1.9 mi)

Basin features
- Progression: Swabian Rezat→ Rednitz→ Regnitz→ Main→ Rhine→ North Sea
- Tributaries
  - left: Schloßgraben
  - right: Eichgraben

Ottmarsfelder Graben is a river of Bavaria, Germany. The river is a three kilometer long brook in the Middle Franconian district of Weißenburg-Gunzenhausen. It flows to the west, and joins the Swabian Rezat at Zollmühle, north of Ellingen. Its upper section, upstream from Ottmarsfeld, is also referred to as the Seiserbach.

== See also ==
- List of rivers of Bavaria
