= Arbach (Swabian Rezat) =

River in Bavaria, Germany

- Location of mouth in Bavaria

Location
- Country: Germany
- State: Bavaria

Physical characteristics
- Mouth
  - location: Swabian Rezat
  - coordinates: 49.1049°N 10.9876°E

Basin features
- Progression: Swabian Rezat→ Rednitz→ Regnitz→ Main→ Rhine→ North Sea
- Tributaries
  - right: Arbachgraben

Arbach is a river in Bavaria, Germany. It is a right tributary of the Swabian Rezat near Pleinfeld in the Middle Franconian district Weißenburg-Gunzenhausen.

The Arbach rises at an altitude of 462 m (1,516 ft) above sea level at Walting in Pleinfeld and feeds there the pond Bachweiher. To the north-east of the wood field sector Totenleite, it is fed on its right side by the Arbachgraben, which is coming from the north from Kreisstraße WUG 16 . It flows further north along the Celtic Viereckschanze and then south of the hill Weingartner Berg (467 m (1,532 ft) above sea level) and finally flows at a height of 373 m (1,224 ft) above sea level in Pleinfeld, north of the street Zollgasse, from the right into the Swabian Rezat.

== See also ==
- List of rivers of Bavaria
