= Rezat =

Rezat may refer to:

- Fränkische Rezat, a river in Bavaria, Germany
- Schwäbische Rezat, a river in Bavaria, Germany
