= Silberbach (Franconian Rezat) =

River in Germany

Location
- Country: Germany
- State: Bavaria

Physical characteristics
- Source
  - location: East of Kurzendorf, a district of Ansbach
  - coordinates: 49.2679°N 10.5376°E
- Mouth
  - location: Alberndorf, a district of Ansbach
  - coordinates: 49.2822°N 10.6404°E

Basin features
- Progression: Franconian Rezat→ Rednitz→ Regnitz→ Main→ Rhine→ North Sea

The Silberbach is a river of Bavaria, Germany.

The Silberbach springs east of Kurzendorf, a parish of Ansbach. It is a right tributary of the Franconian Rezat at Alberndorf, a district of Sachsen bei Ansbach.

== See also ==
- List of rivers of Bavaria
