= Felchbach =

River in Germany

Location
- Country: Germany
- State: Bavaria

Physical characteristics
- Mouth
  - location: Swabian Rezat
  - coordinates: 49.0479°N 10.9665°E
- Length: 15.4 km (9.6 mi)

Basin features
- Progression: Swabian Rezat→ Rednitz→ Regnitz→ Main→ Rhine→ North Sea
- Tributaries
  - left: Engelbach, Gallersbach, Ringelbach, Ettenbach, Rohrbach, Frommbach, Bösbach
  - right: Bruckbach

The Felchbach is a river of Bavaria, Germany. It flows into the Swabian Rezat near Weißenburg in Bayern.

== See also ==
- List of rivers of Bavaria
