= Dennenloher See =

Lake in Ansbach, Bavaria, Germany

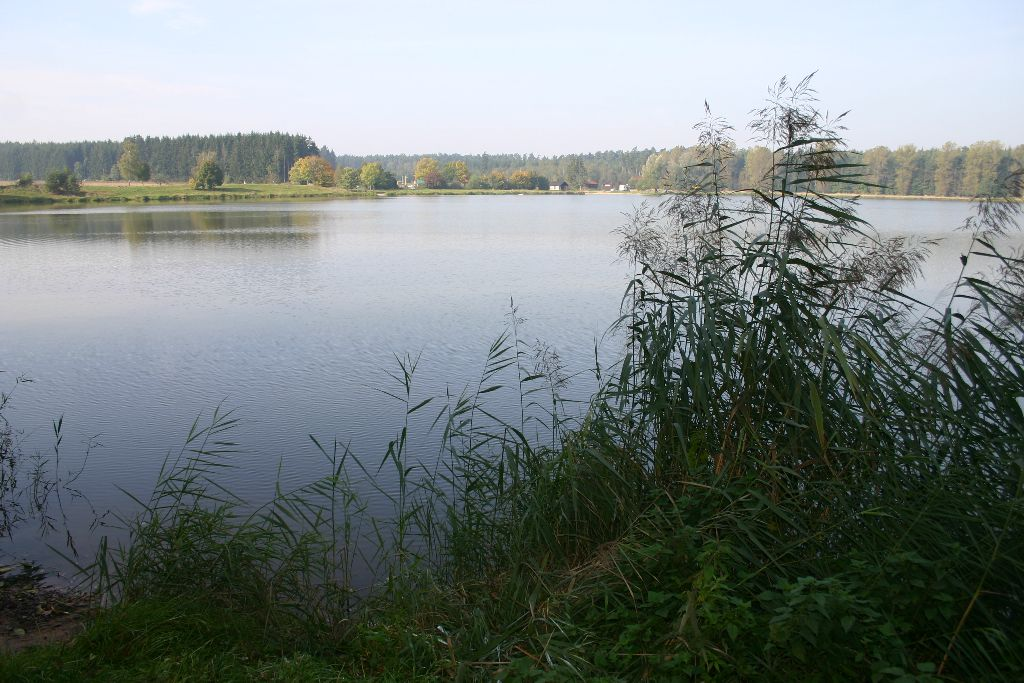

- Location within Bavaria
- Location: Ansbach, Bavaria
- Coordinates: 49°6′25″N 10°36′56″E
- Lake type: Meromictic
- Primary inflows: Lentersheimer Mühlenbach
- Primary outflows: Wörnitz
- Basin countries: Germany
- Max. length: 1.1 km (0.68 mi)
- Max. width: 0.28 km (0.17 mi)
- Surface area: 0.2 km^{2} (0.077 sq mi)
- Average depth: 2.4 m (7.9 ft)
- Islands: 2
- Settlements: Dennenlohe

Dennenloher See is a lake in Ansbach, Bavaria, Germany. It has a surface area of 20 hectares. The lake is located 14 km west of Gunzenhausen, Dennenlohe. It is the smallest body of water in the Franconian Lake District.

== Neighbouring lakes ==
- Altmühlsee
- Großer Brombachsee
- Igelsbachsee
- Kleiner Brombachsee
- Rothsee
- Hahnenkammsee
