= Weimersheimer Bach =

River in Germany

Location
- Country: Germany
- State: Bavaria

Physical characteristics
- Source
  - location: near Weimersheim
  - elevation: 471 metres (1,545 ft)
- Mouth
  - location: Swabian Rezat
  - coordinates: 49.0261°N 10.9544°E
  - elevation: 405 metres (1,329 ft)

Basin features
- Progression: Swabian Rezat→ Rednitz→ Regnitz→ Main→ Rhine→ North Sea

Weimersheimer Bach is a river of Bavaria, Germany. It flows into the Swabian Rezat near Weißenburg in Bayern.

== See also ==
- List of rivers of Bavaria
