= Roter Graben =

Roter Graben may refer to:

- Roter Graben (Große Röder), a river of Saxony, Germany, tributary of the Große Röder
- Roter Graben (Swabian Rezat), river of Bavaria, Germany, tributary of the Swabian Rezat
