= Spalt =

- Town
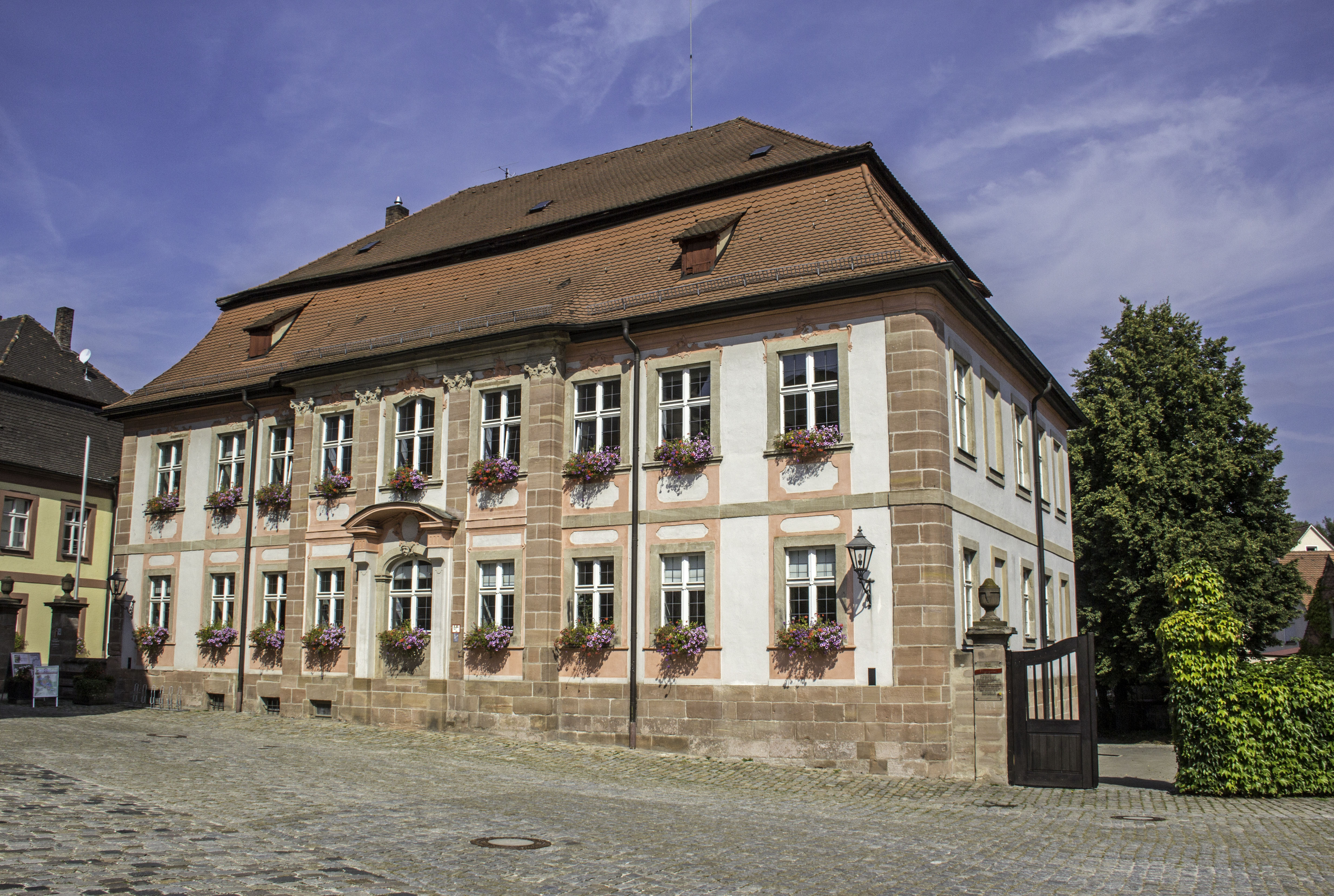
- Town Hall of Spalt

- Coat of arms

- Location of Spalt within Roth district
- Interactive map of Spalt
- Location within Germany Location within Bavaria
- Coordinates: 49°10′26″N 10°55′39″E
- Country: Germany
- State: Bavaria
- Admin. region: Mittelfranken
- District: Roth
- Subdivisions: 18 districts

Government
  - Mayor (2020–26): Udo Weingart (CSU)

Area
  - Total: 55.67 km^{2} (21.49 sq mi)
- Elevation: 309 m (1,014 ft)

Population (2025-12-31)
  - Total: 5,203
  - Density: 93.46/km^{2} (242.1/sq mi)
- Time zone: UTC+01:00 (CET)
  - Summer (DST): UTC+02:00 (CEST)
- Postal codes: 91174
- Dialling codes: 09175
- Vehicle registration: RH, HIP
- Website: www.spalt.de

Spalt (German pronunciation: [ʃpalt]; Franconian dialect: Schbåld) is a town in the district of Roth, in Bavaria, Germany. It is situated 19 km southwest of Schwabach. Spalt is famous for growing hops for brewing beer.

== Geography ==
Spalt is situated between Nuremberg, Ansbach, and Treuchtlingen in the north of the Franconian lakelands. In the southwest of the city is the Great Brombachsee and its dam. The Fränkische Rezat flows through Georgensgmünd into the Rednitz.

== Neighboring communities ==
(starting in the north and going clockwise)

- Abenberg
- Georgensgmünd
- Röttenbach
- Pleinfeld
- Absberg
- Haundorf
- Mitteleschenbach
- Windsbach

== Division of the town ==
The following places belong to the community of Spalt:

Egelmühle, Enderndorf, Engelhof, Fünfbronn, Großweingarten, Güsseldorf, Hagsbronn, Heiligenblut, Hohenrad, Höfstetten, Hügelmühle, Kaltenbrunn, Keilberg, Massendorf, Mosbach, Mühlreisig, Nagelhof, Ottmannsberg, Schnittling, Steinfurt, Stiegelmühle, Stockheim, Straßenhaus, Theilenberg, Trautenfurt, Untererlbach, Wasserzell, Wernfels

== Politics ==
Udo Weingart has held the office of mayor since February 1995. He is a member of the CSU political party.

Since 1972, it has had a twin town relationship with Bad Sauerbrunn in the Austrian province of Burgenland, and since 2006, another one with St. Cloud, Minnesota.

== Culture and sights ==
- Spalt has two museums: the Hops and Beer Museum, and a fire station museum.
- The end of August is celebrated by the annual Hopfenzupferfest, during which a girl is crowned the "Hops Queen."
- Every two years, the Funsport Challenge Madmud (well known throughout Europe) is held here.
- Planetenweg (Planet Path): In the Summer of 2000, a 1:1 billion scale model of the Solar System was constructed between Spalt and the neighbouring town of Georgensgmünd. The model begins with a globe representing the Sun behind Georgensgmünd's town hall. A 7 km bike path leads one through Rezat valley towards Spalt, where Pluto (now considered a dwarf planet) is represented at the train station of the town. Each planet model has a display board nearby with facts about the planet.
- Spalt is well known nationally for its beer. Throughout the surrounding area, it is nearly impossible to find any brand of beer other than "Spalter". The town has a saying about its beer: "In Spalt, in Spalt, dou wern di Leit gor alt; sie kenna nix dafier, dös macht ös goute Bier" (In Spalt, people grow very old; they do not contribute to that, it's done by good beer.)
- Spalt is the middle of one of Germany's hops cultivation zones, having grown hops since 1341, with the hops seal since 1538.

== Buildings ==
- Das Kornhaus is a former tithe barn of the Prince Bishops of Eichstätt. The timber-framed building dates from the first half of the 15th century, and in 1862 became the property of the city and served from 1897 to 1984 for hops storage. The building is 36 meters long, 13 meters wide and 20 meters high.
- The baroque town hall was designed by Gabriel de Gabrieli, a court architect in Eichstätt, and was built in the years 1751 to 1756.
- The former Doppelkanonikatshaus originally served as a refectory of the monastery of St. Nicholas and St. Emmeram. It was built in the years 1753 to 1756, after the secularization of the school building. Until 1981, it still served as a convent of the School Sisters. Currently, the municipal nursery school is located here.
- The former collegiate church of St. Nicholas was built in the years 1767 to 1771, by Matthias Binder from Ellingen, of the German Order of Architects. This preserved Baroque building was the successor of an earlier church founded in 1294, in the Abbey of St. Nicholas, built from 1302 to 1313 in the same place. Patrons included the Count of Nuremberg Conrad II the Pious and his wife Agnes von Hohenlohe. Inside the church are frescoes by Franz Kürzinger and stucco work of the Wessobrunner school. On the former cemetery wall are 24 old grave sites, one of which, No. 14, holds the epitaph of the deacon Wolfgang Agricola. In the 1960s the church was renovated.
- The evangelical Christophorus-Kirche is a neo-gothic sandstone building. It was originally only a chapel with skylights, but received a tower in 1895, south of the nave.
- The Catholic parish was built in 1738 by Moritz Pedetti. The baroque building on the first floor has beautiful plaster ceilings. It served since 1812 as a parsonage.
- The Shepherd's Tower is believed to have been started in first half of the 14th century, and completed in the middle of the 15th century. It was a part of the town's fortification.
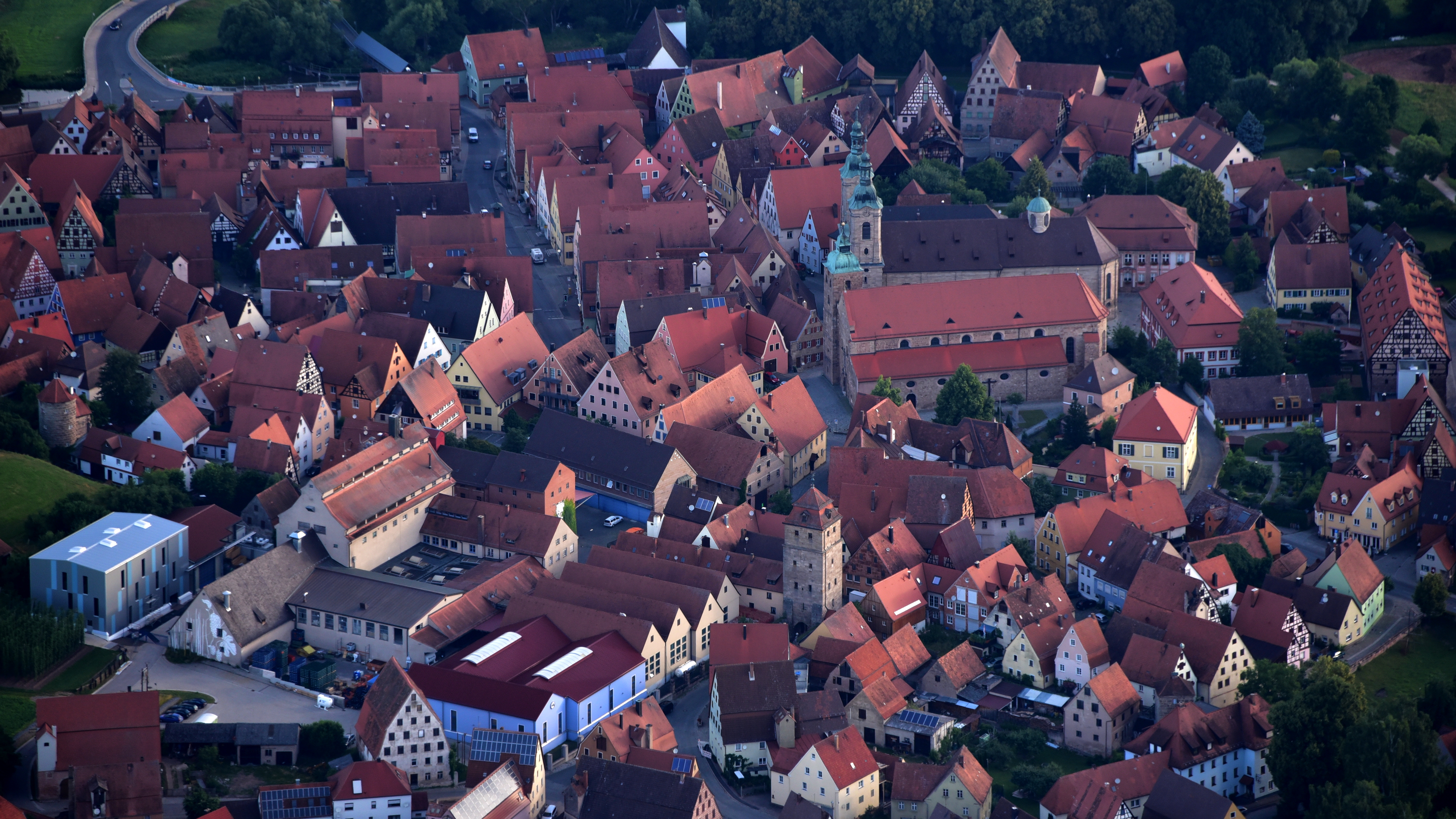
Aerial view of the town centre

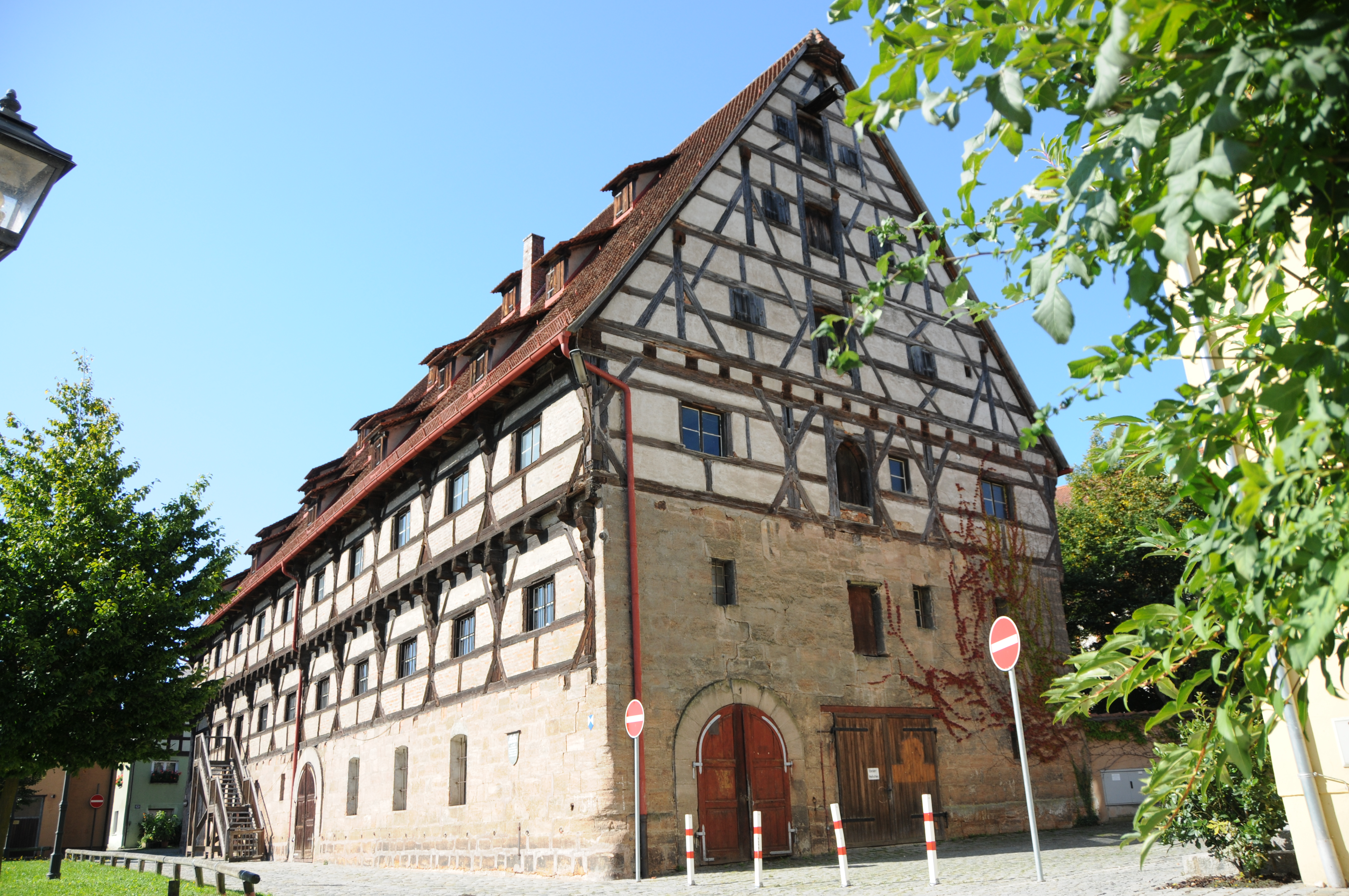
The Kornhaus (Museum)

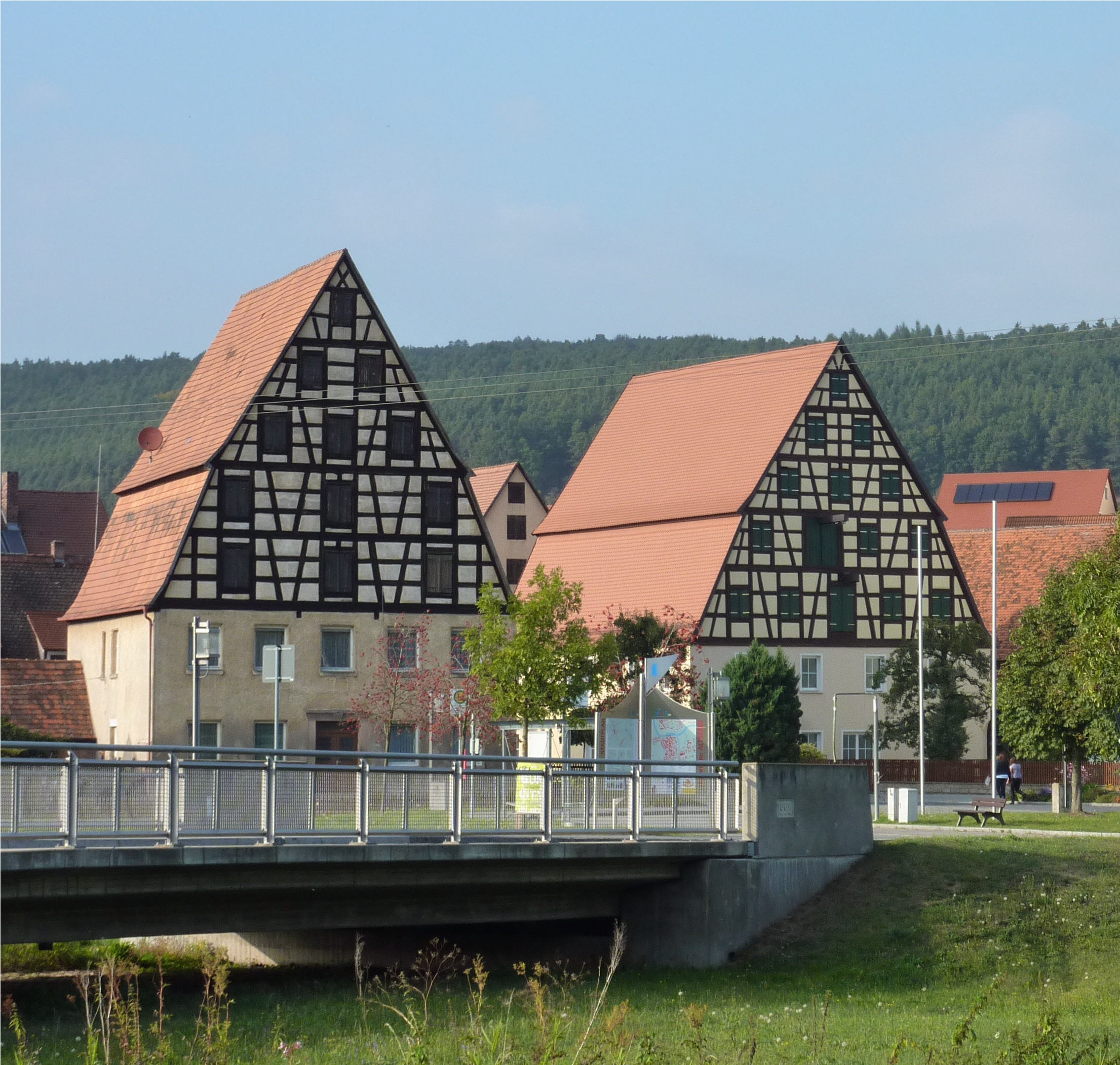
Houses in Spalt

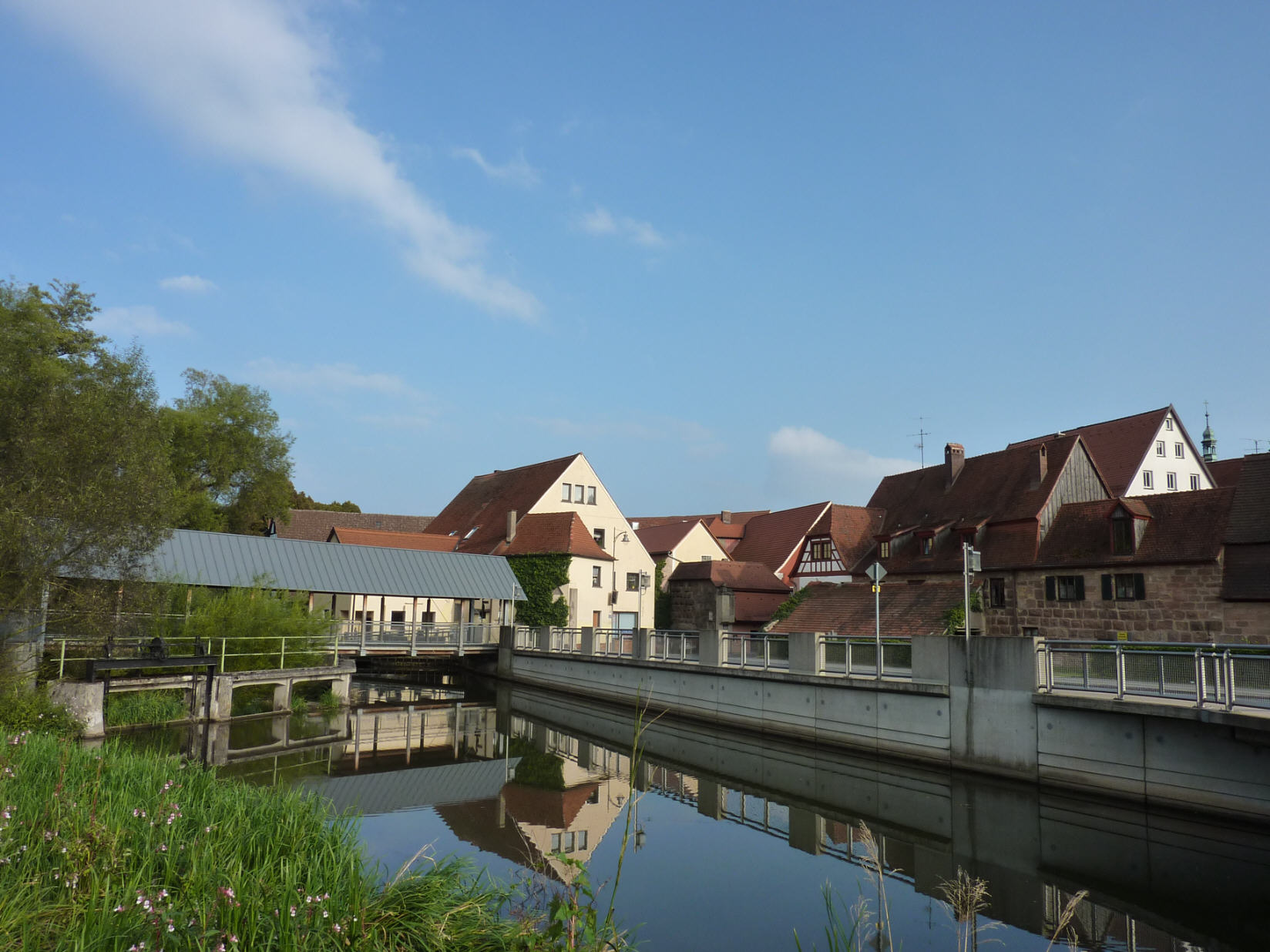
The Rezat

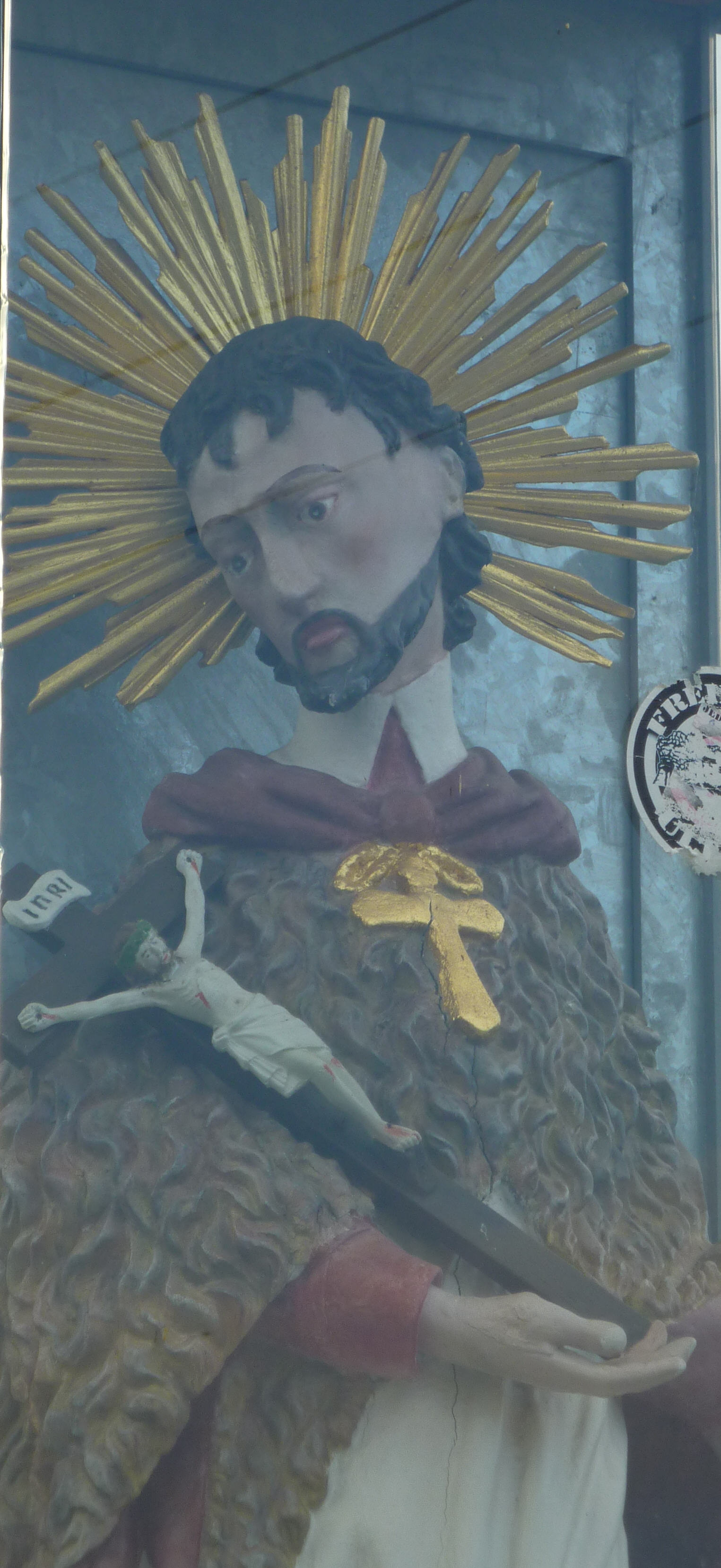
St. Nepomuk

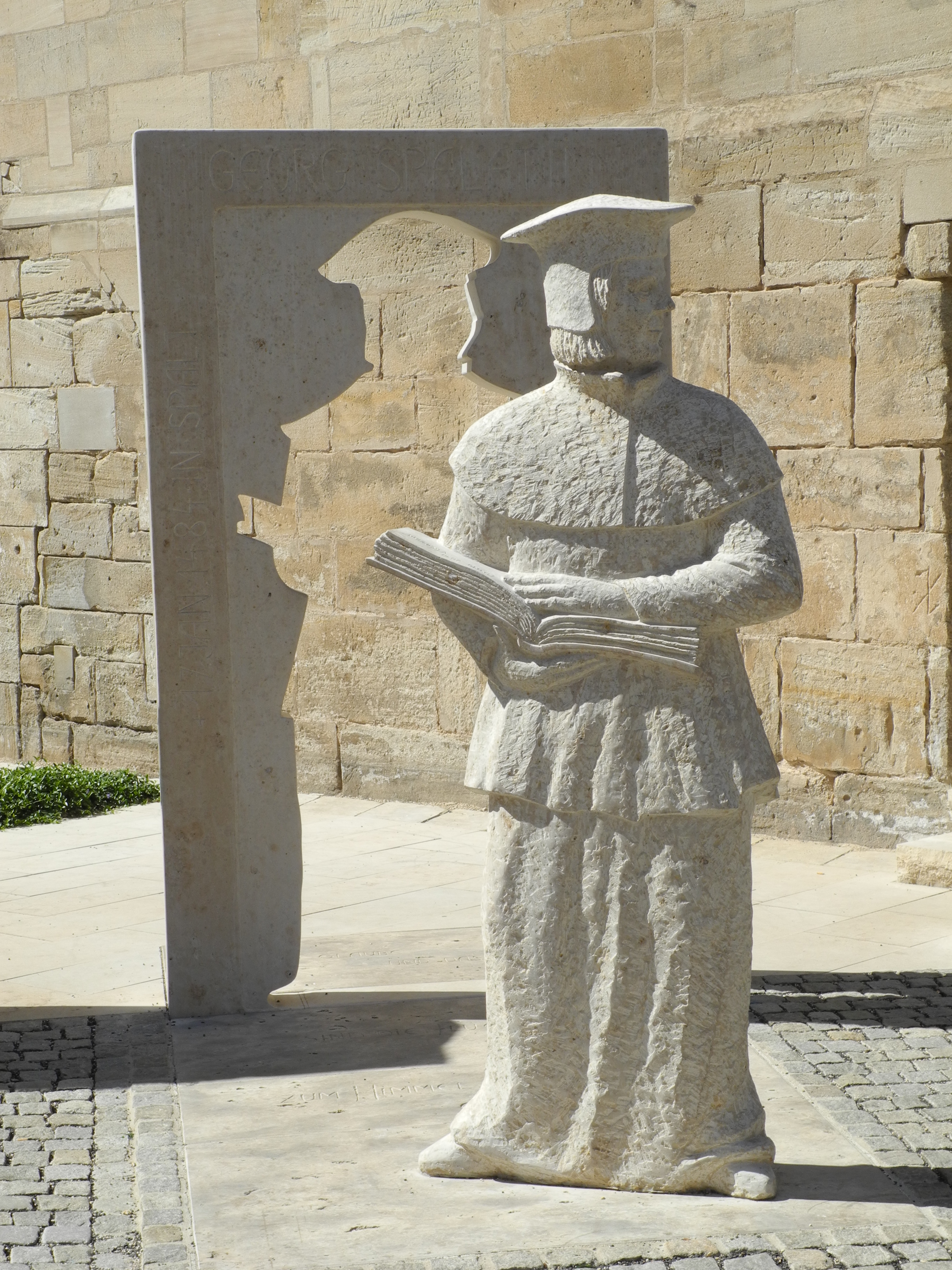
Spalatin memorial, Spalt

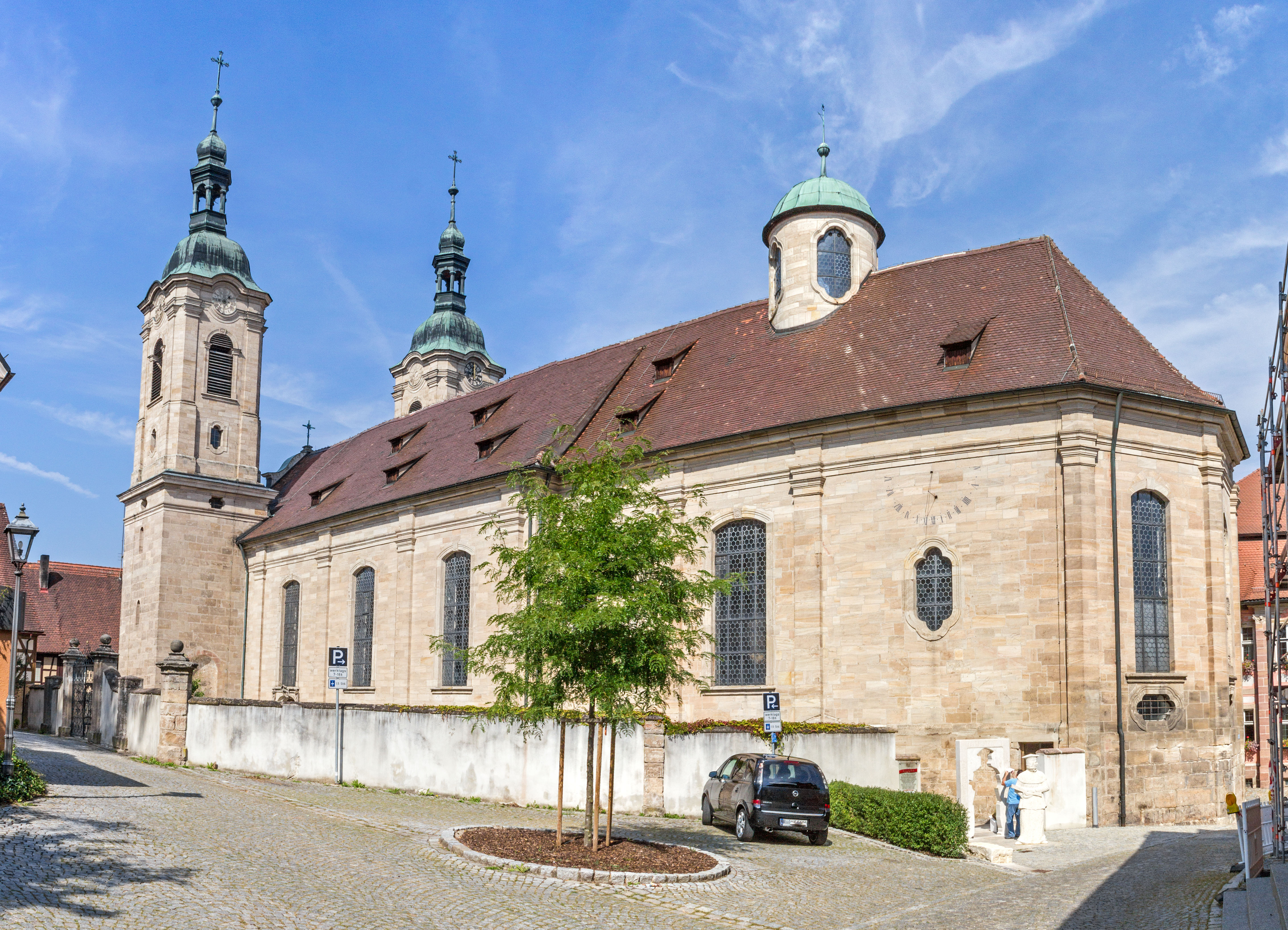
Church St. Nikolaus, Spalt

== Famous people ==
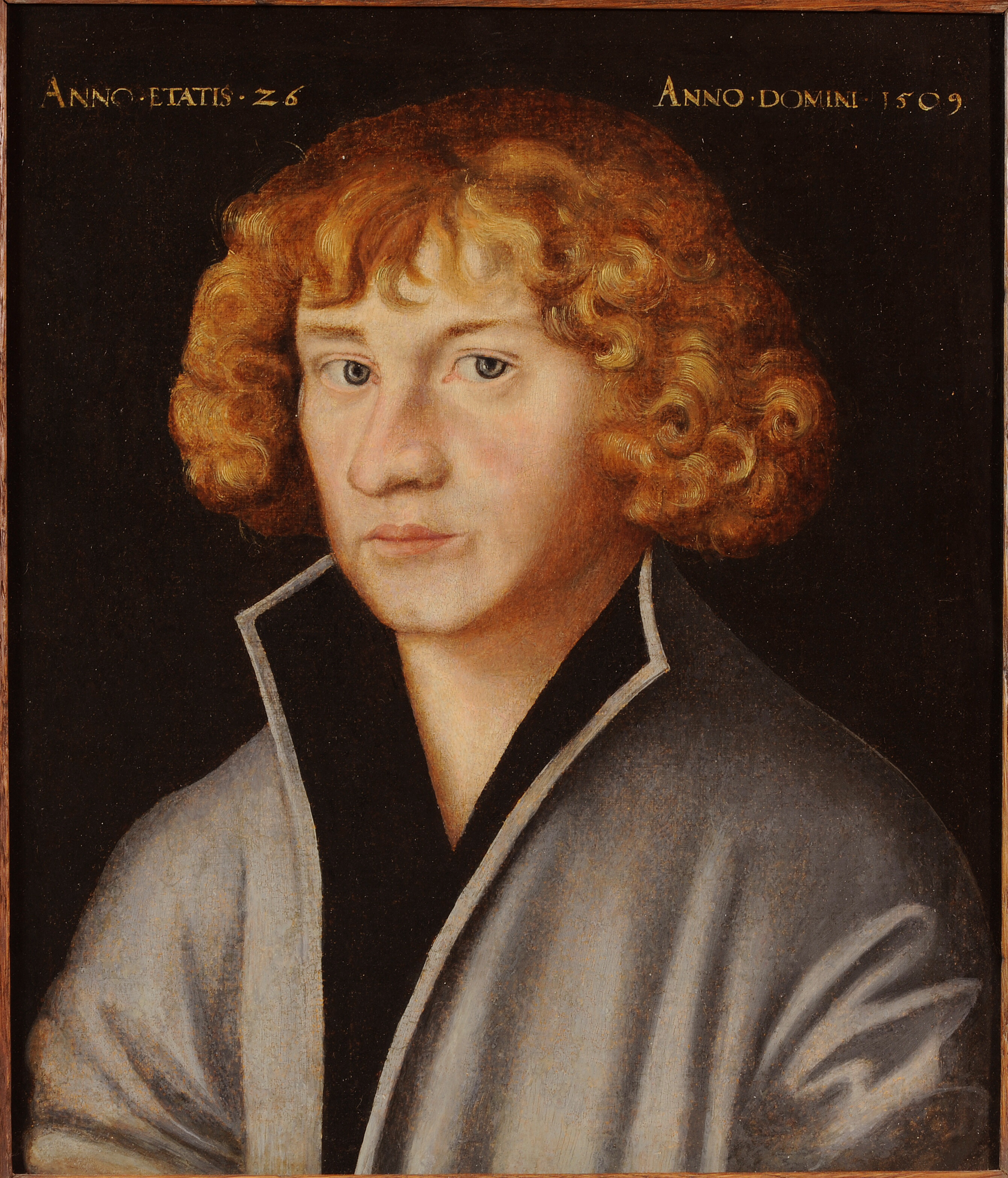
Portrait of Georg Spalatin 1509

- Georg Spalatin, (1484-1545), sympathetic supporter of Martin Luther, he named himself after his hometown
- Hanns Braun (1886-1918), athlete, was successful in the Olympic summer games in 1908 in London and in 1912 in Stockholm
- Ernst Hiemer, German writer
- Wolfgang Spann, (1921-2013), coroner
- Hubert Schwartz, (born 1954), extreme athlete
- Franz Baader (born 1959), professor at the Technical University of Dresden

== Transportation ==
Spalt is reachable by bus from Georgensmund railway station operated by Verkehrsverbund Großraum Nürnberg, namely Bus 623 and 610.

== Sister Cities ==
- Bad Sauerbrunn, Austria
- Saint Cloud, Minnesota, United States
