= Iglseebach =

River in Germany

Location
- Country: Germany
- States: Bavaria

Physical characteristics
- Mouth
  - location: Swabian Rezat
  - coordinates: 49.1224°N 11.0054°E

Basin features
- Progression: Swabian Rezat→ Rednitz→ Regnitz→ Main→ Rhine→ North Sea

Iglseebach is a small river of Bavaria, Germany. It flows into the Swabian Rezat near Pleinfeld.

== See also ==
- List of rivers of Bavaria
