= Bösbach =

River in Germany

- View of the Bösbach between the two parts of Rohrwalk (belonging to Weißenburg in Bayern), where the river is called Rohrbach

Location
- Country: Germany
- State: Bavaria

Physical characteristics
- Mouth
  - location: Felchbach
  - coordinates: 49.0474°N 10.9717°E

Basin features
- Progression: Felchbach→ Swabian Rezat→ Rednitz→ Regnitz→ Main→ Rhine→ North Sea

Bösbach is a river of Bavaria, Germany. It flows into the Felchbach near Weißenburg in Bayern.

== See also ==
- List of rivers of Bavaria
