= Mittelbühlgraben =

River in Germany

Location
- Country: Germany
- States: Bavaria

Physical characteristics
- Mouth
  - location: Swabian Rezat
  - coordinates: 49.0581°N 10.9617°E

Basin features
- Progression: Swabian Rezat→ Rednitz→ Regnitz→ Main→ Rhine→ North Sea

Mittelbühlgraben is a river of Bavaria, Germany. It flows into the Swabian Rezat in Ellingen.

== See also ==
- List of rivers of Bavaria
