= Klingenbach (disambiguation) =

Klingenbach is a town in the Eisenstadt-Umgebung district in the Austrian state of Burgenland.

Klingenbach may also refer to:

- Klingenbach (Bühler), a river of Baden-Württemberg, Germany, tributary of the Bühler
- Klingenbach (Goldbach), a river of Bavaria, Germany, tributary to the Flutgraben
- Klingenbach (Igelsbach), a river of Bavaria, Germany, tributary of the Igelsbach
- Klingenbach (Jagst, Steinbach an der Jagst), a river of Baden-Württemberg, Germany, tributary of the Jagst
