= Banzerbach =

River in Germany

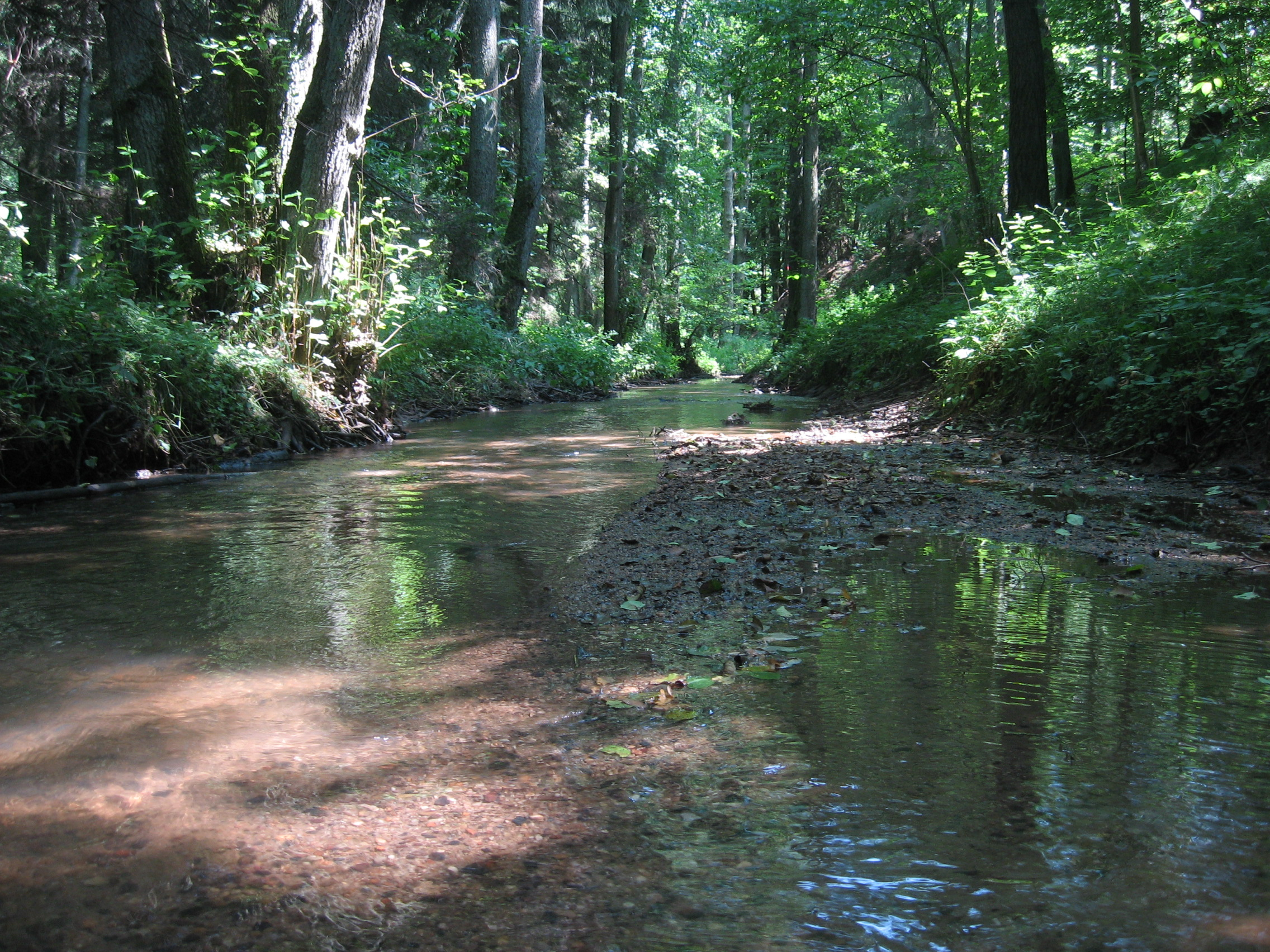
- The Banzerbach near Pleinfeld seen from west

Location
- Country: Germany
- State: Bavaria

Physical characteristics
- Mouth
  - location: South of Pleinfeld into the Swabian Rezat
  - coordinates: 49.0964°N 10.9823°E

Basin features
- Progression: Swabian Rezat→ Rednitz→ Regnitz→ Main→ Rhine→ North Sea
- Tributaries
  - right: Bachwiesengraben, Walkerszeller Bach

The Banzerbach is a river of Bavaria, Germany. It is a left tributary of the Swabian Rezat. Its upper course, upstream from its confluence with the Bachwiesengraben, is called Weihergraben. Its middle course, between the confluence with the Bachwiesengraben and the confluence with the Walkerszeller Bach, is called Buxbach. It flows into the Swabian Rezat south of Pleinfeld.

== See also ==
- List of rivers of Bavaria
