= Silberbach =

Silberbach may refer to:

- Silberbach (Heubach), a river of North Rhine-Westphalia, Germany, tributary of the Heubach
- Silberbach (Franconian Rezat), a river of Bavaria, Germany, tributary of the Franconian Rezat
- Silberbach, a river of Bavaria, Germany, a bifurcation of the Kaltenmühlbach
- Silberbach, a river of Carinthia, Austria, that flows through Guttaring
- Cisnădie (river), German name Silberbach, a tributary of the river Cibin in Romania
- Silberbach, a village in Upper Franconia, Bavaria, Germany, today part of the municipality Konradsreuth
- Stříbrná, German name Silberbach, a village and municipality in the Karlovy Vary Region of the Czech Republic
- Strużyna, Warmian-Masurian Voivodeship, German name Silberbach, a village within Ostróda County, Warmian-Masurian Voivodeship, Poland
- Guido Silberbach (1967–2025), German footballer
