= Brombachmoor =

Brombachmoor Nature Reserve
- Naturschutzgebiet Brombachmoor
- IUCN category IV (habitat/species management area)
- Interactive map of Brombachmoor Nature Reserve
- Location: Langlau
- Coordinates: 49°07′51″N 10°50′41″E
- Area: 0.0356 km^{2} (0.0137 sq mi)
- Elevation: 413 m (1,355 ft)
- Designation: NSG500.011
- Established: 3 November 1983
- Administrator: Weißenburg-Gunzenhausen

The Brombachmoor is a nature reserve in the Franconian Lake District in the Middle Franconian county of Weißenburg-Gunzenhausen in the German state of Bavaria.

The fen lies west of the Kleiner Brombachsee lake between the villages of Langlau and Absberg, near the Hühnermühle and Neuherberg in the parish of Thannhausen. Since 3 November 1983 it has been a designated Naturschutzgebiet with an area of 3.56 hectares, and thus the smallest nature reserve in the county. Since the flooding of the little Brombachsee in 1985 the area has become the last surviving remains of the natural Brombach valley.

Through the bog flows the Brombach, the stream that gives it its name, and which empties into the Altmühlüberleiter ("Old Mill Diversion Channel") around 250 metres to the southeast. The roughly 700-metre-long trough-shaped valley is covered in alder carr woods and riparian woodland as well as small pools known as Tümpeln. Between the sedge hummocks there are bulrushes, peat mosses, dogbanes, sedges und rushes.
