= Altmühlsee =

Reservoir in Bavaria, Germany

Altmühlsee Lake Altmühl
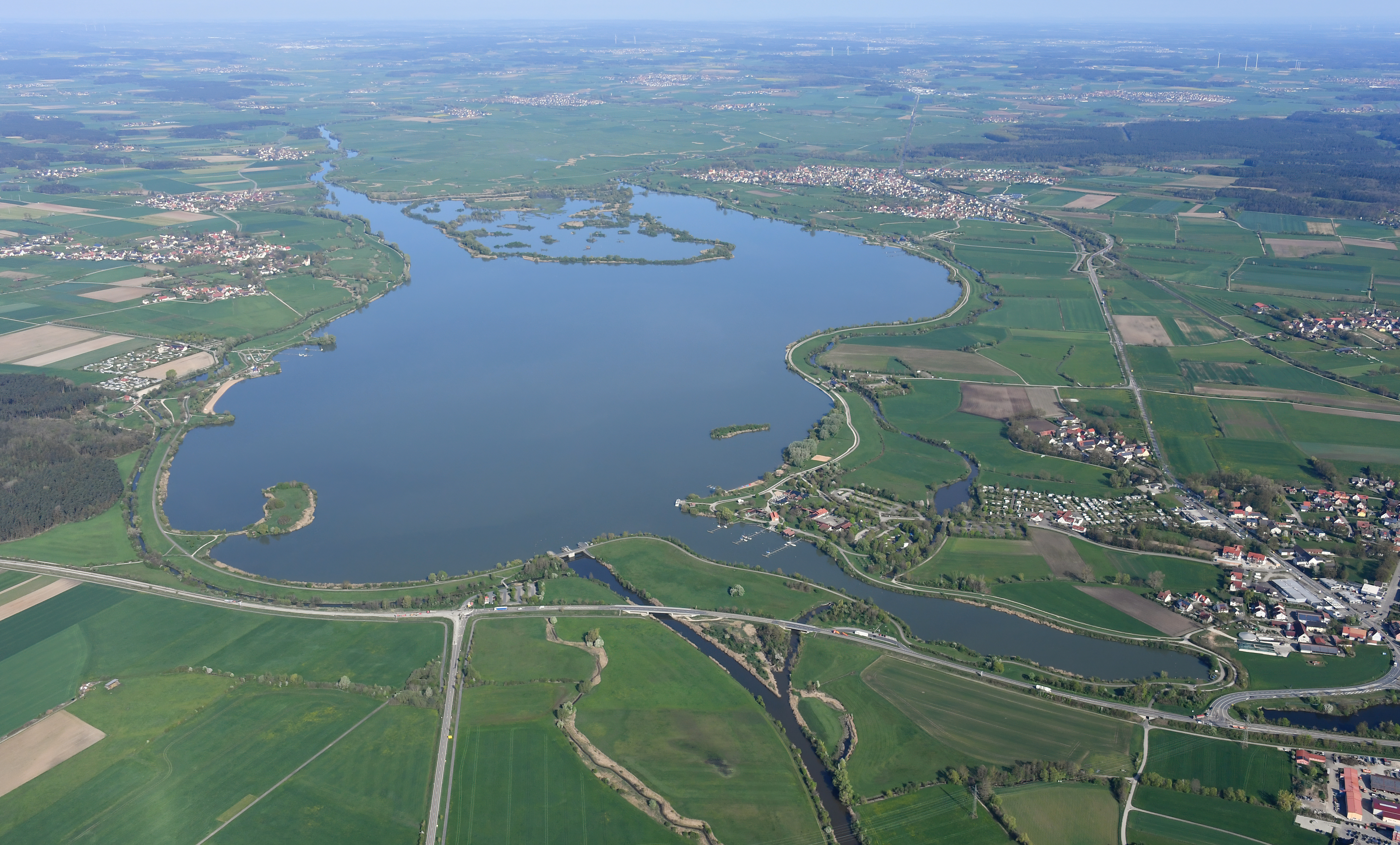
- Aerial image of Altmühlsee (view from the southeast)

- Location within Germany
- Location: Middle Franconia, Bavaria, Germany
- Coordinates: 49°07′59″N 10°43′29″E
- Type: Reservoir
- Part of: Franconian Lake District
- Primary inflows: Altmühlzuleiter (Altmühl), Nesselbach
- Primary outflows: Altmühlüberleiter
- Basin countries: Germany
- Built: 1974 (start)
- First flooded: 1985
- Max. length: 4 km (2.5 mi)
- Max. width: 1.7 km (1.1 mi)
- Surface area: 4.5 km^{2} (1.7 sq mi)
- Average depth: 2.5 m (8 ft 2 in)
- Max. depth: 3 m (9.8 ft)
- Water volume: 13,800,000 m^{3} (490,000,000 cu ft)
- Surface elevation: 415 m (1,362 ft)
- Settlements: Gunzenhausen, Muhr am See

The Altmühlsee (English: Lake Altmühl) is a reservoir in Germany. It is located in the district Weißenburg-Gunzenhausen, approximately 44 km (27 mi) southwest of Nueremberg in the Bavarian region of Middle Franconia. It is part of the Franconian Lake District.

== Geography ==
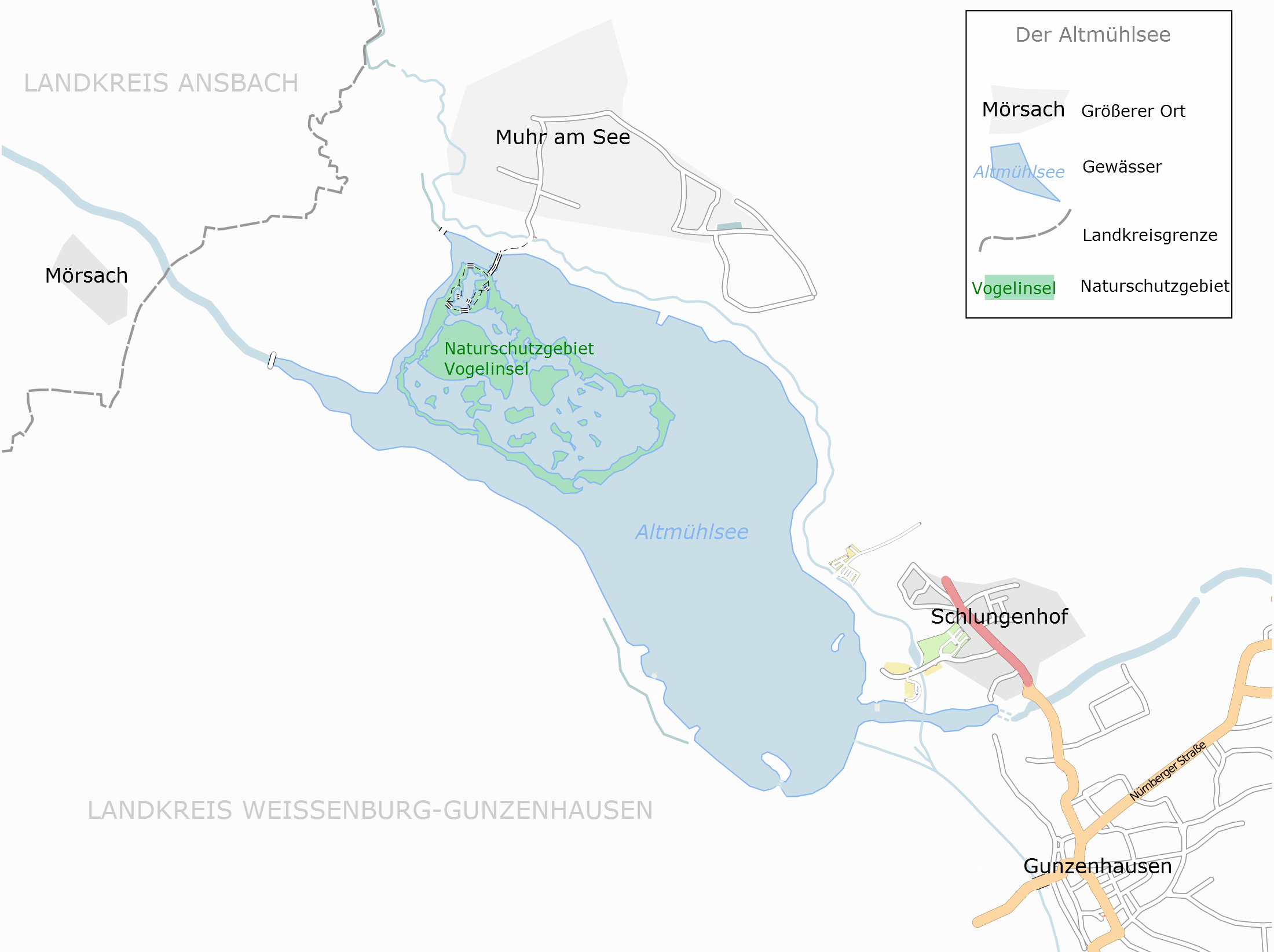
Altmühlsee on a map

The lake is filled up by flood crests from the Altmühl, which are transferred to the Altmühlsee via the Altmühlzuleiter, a 4.7 km (2.9 mi) long artificial river starting near Gern (Ornbau). The lake is situated in the wetlands of the former course of the Altmühl. It is 4 km (2.5 mi) long and up to 1.7 km (1.1 mi) wide and covers a total area of 4.5 km^{2} (1.7 sq mi). Despite its size, the lake is relatively shallow, with a maximum depth of only 3 m (9.8 ft). Altmühlsee can store up to 13.8 mil. km³ (3.3 mil. cu mi) of water.

Half a kilometre north of the lake, there is the municipality Muhr am See, 1 km (0.62 mi) from the eastern shore there are residental areas belonging to the town of Gunzenhausen. Southwest of the lake, some smaller villages are only a few hundred meters away from shore.

Remarkable is the lake's narrow eastern extension, near the Seezentrum Schlungenhof (Schlungenhof lake centre), in which the pier for the MS Altmühlsee ship is located. Furthermore, there is a clubhouse, respectively around 100 moorings and land-based berths, a jetty for small boats, a slipway, a boat crane, and a charging station for electric boats.

Nearly half of the northwestern lake area is a nature reserve, 308 acres of this are a special sanctuary for birds. The 3.7 acre Hirteninsel (shepard's island) is located close to the lake's southern shore.

== History ==
On 16 July 1970, the Bavarian parliament decided to build the Franconian Lake District, of which the Altmühlsee is a part. The ground-breaking ceremony for the Altmühlüberleiter, the channel taking excess water from the Altmühlsee to the Kleiner Brombachsee, took place on 4 July 1974. Flooding of the Altmühlsee began in February 1985, later that same year draining of water to the Brombachsee was started. Since then, the so-called Brombachüberleitung (Brombach transition; consists of Altmühlsee, Altmühlüberleiter, Kleiner Brombachsee and Großer Brombachsee) has contributed one sixth (25 mil. m³/ 880 mil. cu ft) annually to the Donau-Main transition.

For building the Franconian Lake District, a distinct authority was established, the Talsperren-Neubauamt Nürnberg (authority for building new dams Nuremberg). Since building on the Altmühlüberleiter was finished, it has been managed by the water authority Ansbach. Since 2012, the complete water management of the lake is done by the VTS centre Gösselthalmühle.

Since 2014, researchers control the amount of microplastics in the lake.

== Dam ==
The 3 to 5.5 m (10 to 18 ft) high dam is made of sand and clay and encloses the lake completely. Its crown length of 12.5 km (7.8 mi) makes it Germany's longest dam installation. In the middle of the structure there is a sealing wall made of 6-8 cm (2-3 in) thick steel planks, that reaches down several metres to impermeable ground layers.

During the last years, the inflow has brought great amounts of sediments into the lake, which accumulated and thereby led to a decrease in water depth and quality. Since September 2015, these sediments are removed each year in fall and winter.

== Usage ==
The Altmühlsee is part of a water regulation system that transfers water from the Danube river system to the rivers of Main and Regnitz. Overcoming the European Watershed in the process, this regulation system helps to prevent droughts in the Regnitz, even when precipitation is low. Additionally, it prevents floodings in the valley of the Altmühl. In this system, water flows from the Altmühlsee through the Altmühlüberleiter, that is partly underground, to both the small and the large Brombachsee.

The tourism industry uses the reservoir extensively. The surrounding are is perfect for sailing, surfing and swimming at the many beaches and sunbathing areas. In some years, swimmers might get disturbed by great amounts of algae.

Around the lake, there is a 13 km (8.1 mi) path for hiking and cycling.

On the lake there is a ship route operated by the MS Altmühlsee that serves Muhr am See as well as the Gunzenhausen boroughs of Wald and Schlungenhof. In addition to that, there are a surfing centre, a school for surfing and sailing, two campgrounds, several restaurants and kiosks, parking lots for a total of 1800 cars as well as two recreational areas near the inflow.

Every third Saturday in July a running event (Altmühlseelauf) takes place, each summer there is a series of open-air theatre performances (Altmühlsee-Festspiele).

== Ecology ==
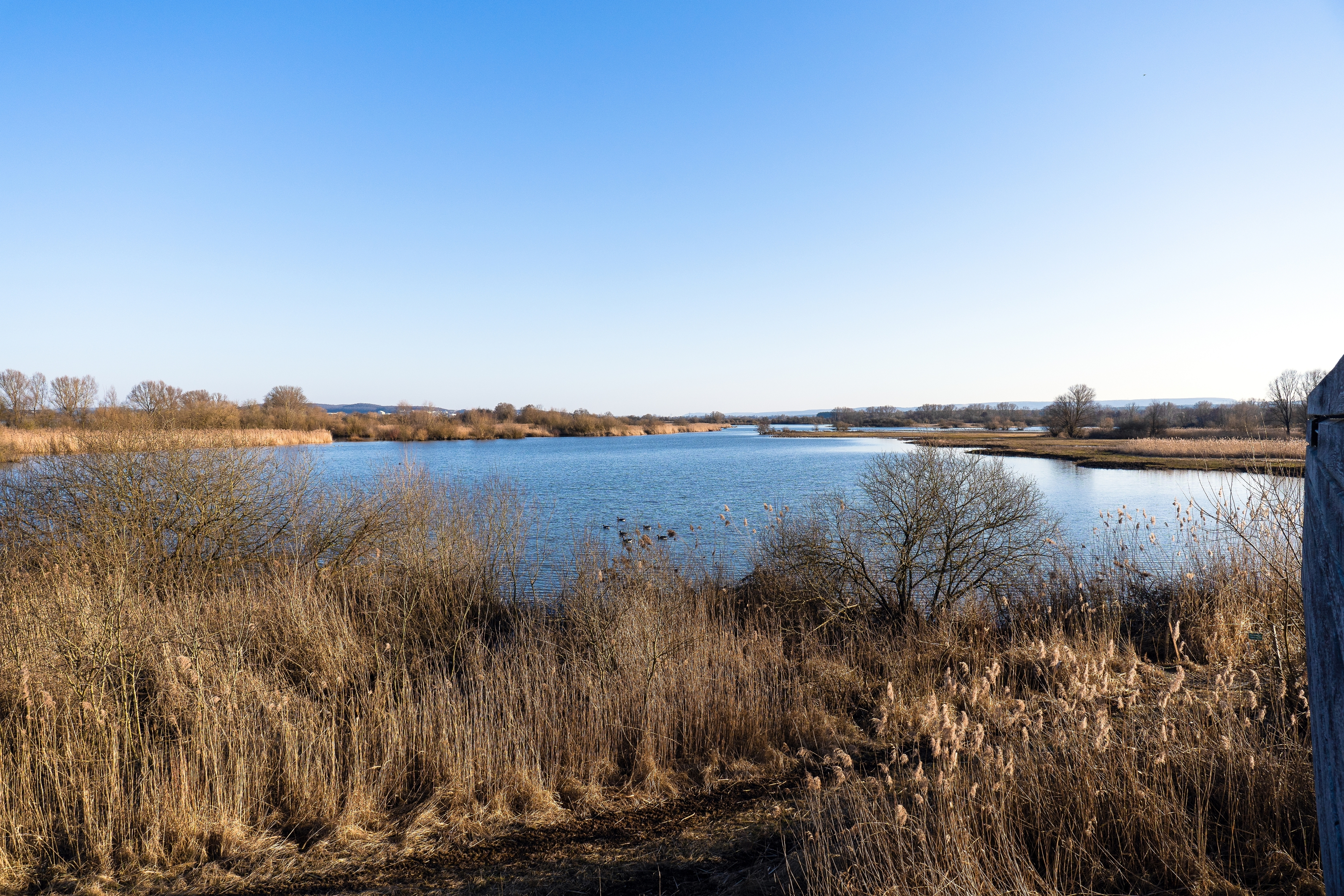
Bird island in the nature conservation area at Altmühlsee

The biggest colony of rare Mediterranean gulls in Bavaria lives at the Altmühlsee. Other rare bird species living around the lake include the Canada goose, garganey, northern shoveler, red-crested pochard, little bittern, western marsh harrier, and yellow-legged gull. In July 2023 two juvenile western cattle egrets were confirmed living at the Altmühlsee. According to nature conservation organisations, this was the first time for western cattle egrets to breed in Germany.

== Accidents and incidents ==
- On 20 July 2008, a kitesurfer was hit by a heavy gust of wind causing them to fall and break their neck
- On 24 May 2009, 21 catamarans in a regatta capsized due to a storm. One person was injured
- On 5 July 2012, the surfing centre at the lake burned down. Damages of several million euros were reported, but luckily all people living in the area managed to escape in time
- On 3 March 2018, a 75-year-old man stepped on the lake's ice although local authorities did not yet consider it safe. He fell through the ice. A firefighter trying to safe the man also fell in the water. While the firefighter could be rescued, the man drowned. His body could only be retrieved the following day after it was located with the help of sonar technology.

== See also ==
- List of dams and reservoirs in Germany
- Franconian Lake District
- List of lakes in Bavaria
