= Roter Graben (Swabian Rezat) =

River in Germany

Location
- Country: Germany
- States: Bavaria

Physical characteristics
- Mouth
  - location: Swabian Rezat
  - coordinates: 49.1317°N 11.0142°E

Basin features
- Progression: Swabian Rezat→ Rednitz→ Regnitz→ Main→ Rhine→ North Sea

Roter Graben is a small river of Bavaria, Germany. It is a right tributary of the Swabian Rezat northeast of Pleinfeld.

== See also ==
- List of rivers of Bavaria
