= Bosbach =

Bosbach may refer to:

== People ==
- Caroline Bosbach (born 1989), German politician
- Franz Bosbach (born 1952), German historian
- Wolfgang Bosbach (born 1952), German politician

== Places ==
- Bösbach, river in Bavaria, Germany
