= Gunzenhausen (Verwaltungsgemeinschaft) =

- Verwaltungsgemeinschaft
- Location of Gunzenhausen within Weißenburg-Gunzenhausen district
- Interactive map of Gunzenhausen
- Location within Germany Location within Bavaria
- Coordinates: 49°08′N 10°50′E
- Country: Germany
- State: Bavaria
- Admin. region: Middle Franconia
- District: Weißenburg-Gunzenhausen
- Seat: Gunzenhausen
- Subdivisions: 4 municipalities

Area
  - Total: 114.53 km^{2} (44.22 sq mi)

Population (2025-12-31)
  - Total: 6,769
  - Density: 59.10/km^{2} (153.1/sq mi)
- Time zone: UTC+01:00 (CET)
  - Summer (DST): UTC+02:00 (CEST)
- Website: www.vggunzenhausen.de

Gunzenhausen is a Verwaltungsgemeinschaft (federation of municipalities) in the district of Weißenburg-Gunzenhausen in Bavaria in Germany. The seat of the Verwaltungsgemeinschaft is in Gunzenhausen, itself not part of the Verwaltungsgemeinschaft.

It consists of the following municipalities:

1. Absberg
2. Haundorf
3. Pfofeld
4. Theilenhofen
