= Stadtbrauerei Spalt =

German brewery

- Location: Spalt, Bavaria, (Germany)
- Coordinates: 49°10′28″N 10°55′30″E
- Opened: 1879
- Key people: Bürgermeister Udo Weingart
- Employees: 50
- Website: spalter-bier.de

The Stadtbrauerei Spalt (Spalt City Brewery in German) is a brewery in the Middle Franconian town of Spalt which was created in the year 1879 through the merger of numerous smaller breweries.

Since 2006, it is the last municipally owned brewery in Germany. For brewing, the local hop variety "Spalter Aromahopfen" is used, which is the town's most important trade good. The history of beer brewing in Spalt can be traced back as far as 1376. The Stadtbrauerei brews in a traditional way without preservatives. The beers are not pasteurised and are kept in cold storage after being filled into bottles. There are 18 different flavours available, brewed after the Bavarian Purity Law of 1516. The ripening takes five to ten weeks.
