= Brombach (Swabian Rezat) =

River of Bavaria

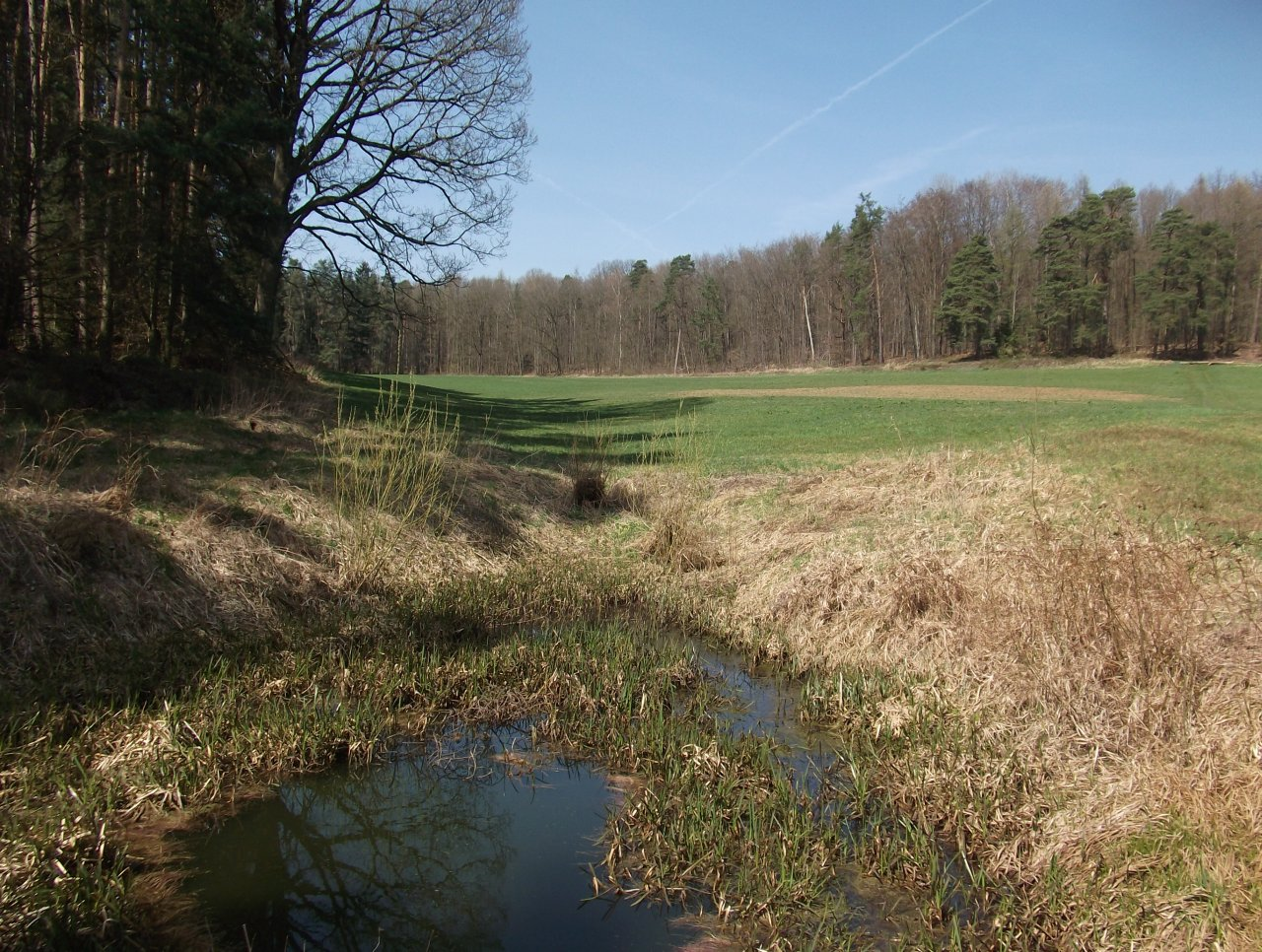
- The source area of the Brombach

Location
- Country: Germany
- State: Bavaria

Physical characteristics
- Mouth
  - location: Swabian Rezat
  - coordinates: 49.1237°N 11.0039°E
- Length: 17.0 km (10.6 mi)

Basin features
- Progression: Swabian Rezat→ Rednitz→ Regnitz→ Main→ Rhine→ North Sea

Brombach is a river of Bavaria, Germany.

It is a left tributary of the Swabian Rezat near Pleinfeld. It flows through the 3.56-hectare nature reserve of Brombachmoor and through the Großer Brombachsee reservoir.

== See also ==
- List of rivers of Bavaria
