= Franconian Lake District =

Group of lakes northern Bavaria, Germany

Coordinates: 49°07′42″N 10°49′03″E

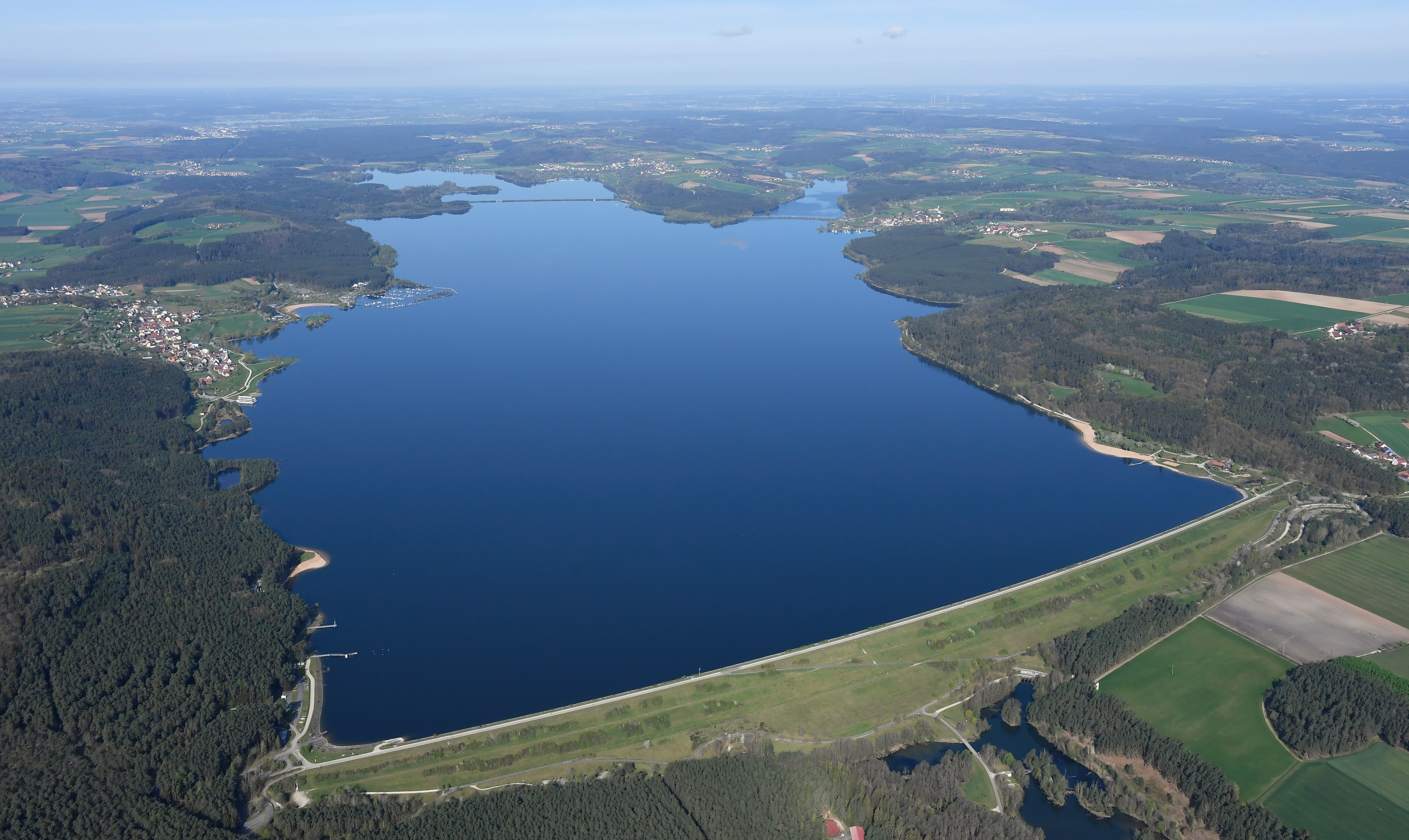
Aerial view of Großer Brombachsee

The Franconian Lake District lies south-west of Nuremberg in northern Bavaria, Germany. It was created as a result of one of Germany's largest water-management projects and was completed by the flooding of the Großer Brombachsee (" Great Brombach Lake") in 2000.

The lakes of Altmühlsee, Brombachsee, Rothsee, Dennenloher See and Hahnenkammsee together form a lake district which is equal in size and infrastructure to the Upper Bavarian Lake District: the Altmühlsee, for example, is the same size as the Königssee, and the Große Brombachsee has the same area as the Tegernsee.

The biggest lake in the district is the Brombach Lake. The Great Brombach Lake is a storage reservoir, about 12.7 square kilometres, in area. With about 17.5 kilometres of shoreline, it is bigger than the Tegernsee and it reaches a maximum depth of about 32 metres. The picturesque Little Brombach Lake is located in the Brombach and Igelsbach valley. Approximately 2.5 square kilometres in size, the lake is used for swimming, surfing, sailing, fishing, and boating.

Europe's largest trimaran passenger ship, the MS Brombachsee, crosses the lake daily as part of a regular service. The shoreline is unspoiled and there are cycle paths and hiking trails around the lake.

The Altmühlsee, situated in the broad valley of the Altmühl, nestles between little villages and meadows. It was created as the first lake in the lake district and has a length of 4 km and an area of roughly 4.5 km^{2}. There is a boat, the Gunzenhausen, which provides passenger services across the lake.

The Rothsee, which is 2.2 km^{2} in area, is divided into an economic area and a swimming area. Surfing and sailing is possible on most of the lake. In its northwestern corner is an extensive nature reserve. The Rothsee has three recreational areas.

== Lakes ==
The Lake District comprises 7 lakes and several streams. The total expanse of water is about 20 km^{2}.

- Großer Brombachsee, 8.7 km²
- Altmühlsee, 4.5 km²
- Kleiner Brombachsee, 2.5 km²
- Rothsee, 2.2 km²
- Igelsbachsee, 0.9 km²
- Hahnenkammsee, 0.23 km²
- Dennenloher See, 0.22 km²
