= Roter Graben (Große Röder) =

River in Germany

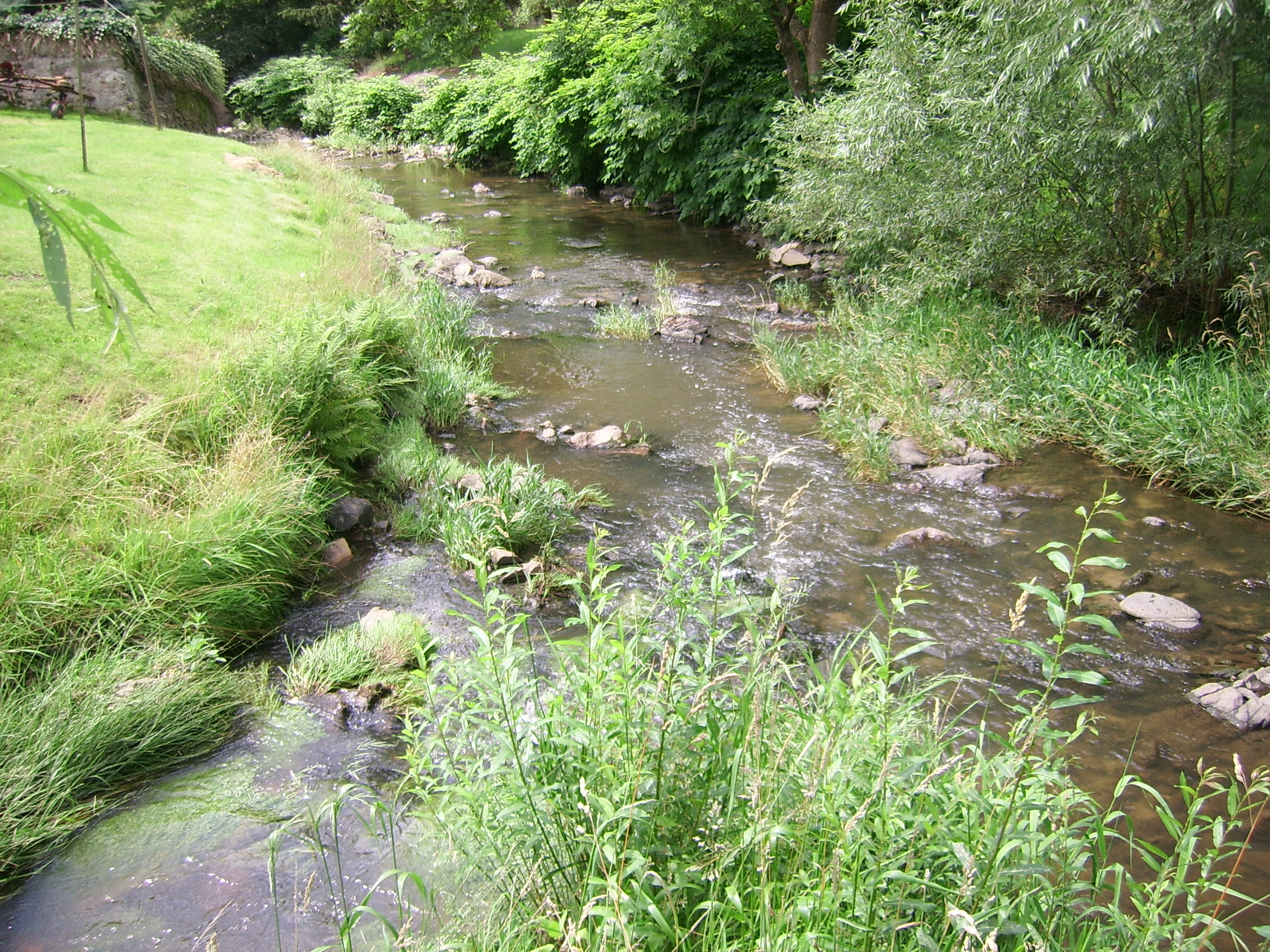
- Mouth of the Roter Graben (left) into the Große Röder

Location
- Country: Germany
- State: Saxony

Physical characteristics
- Mouth: Große Röder
  - location: Grünberg, Ottendorf-Okrilla, Germany
  - coordinates: 51°09′49″N 13°50′33″E

Basin features
- Progression: Große Röder→ Black Elster→ Elbe→ North Sea

The Roter Graben is a river of Saxony, Germany. It rises northeast of Dresden in Dresden Heath. It is a left tributary of the Große Röder in Grünberg, an Ortsteil of Ottendorf-Okrilla.

== See also ==
- List of rivers of Saxony
