= Franconian Rezat =

River in Germany

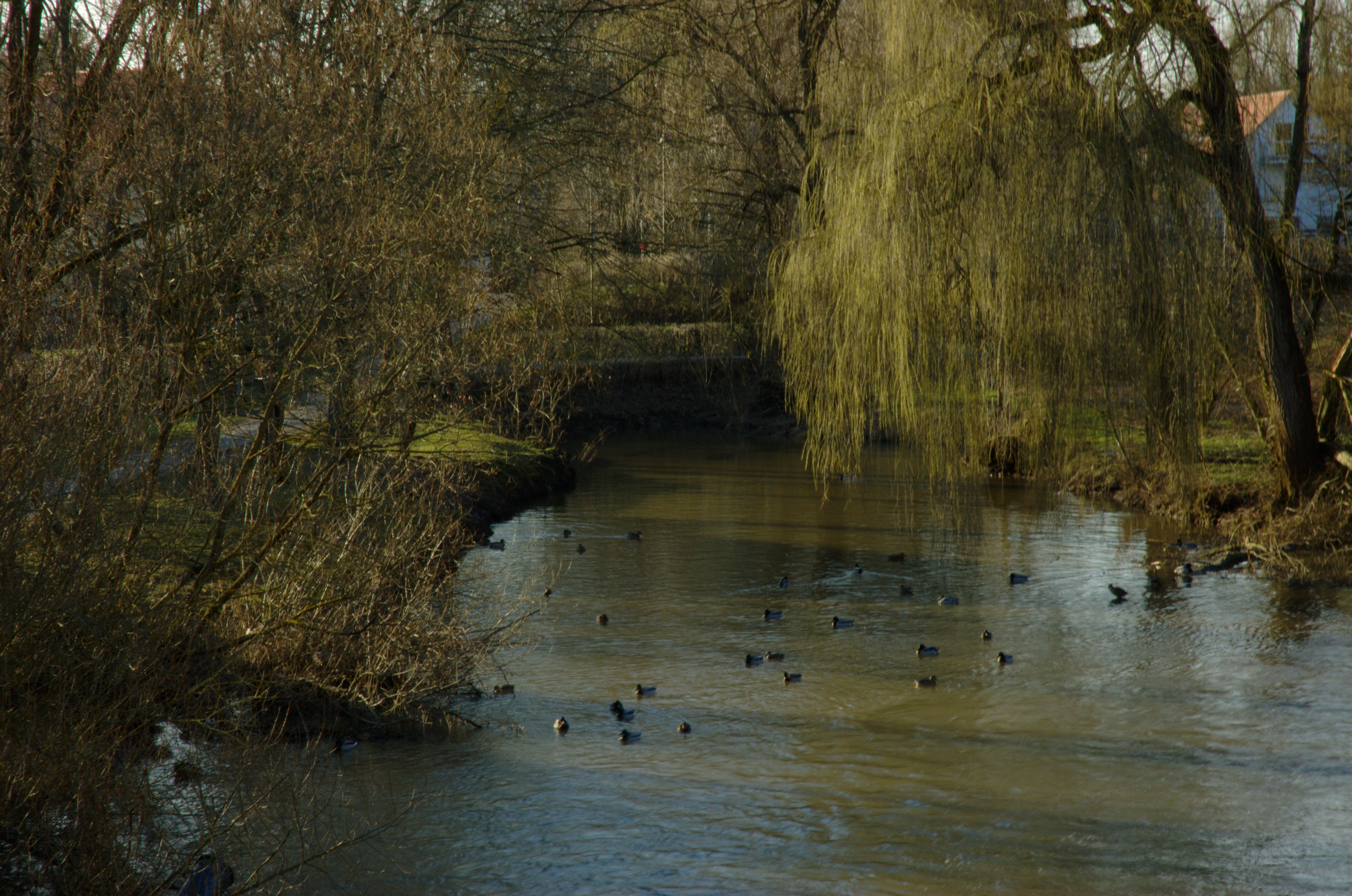
- The Franconian Rezat near Windsbach

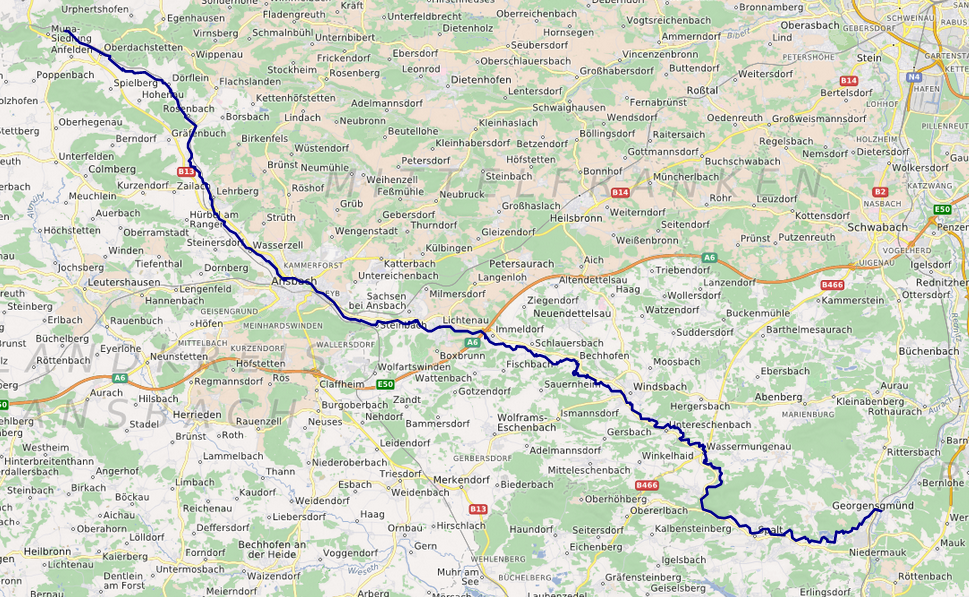
- Course of the Franconian Rezat

Location
- Country: Germany
- State: Bavaria
- Region: Middle Franconia
- Reference no.: DE: 242

Physical characteristics
- Source
  - location: On the Franconian Heights northwest of Oberdachstetten
  - coordinates: 49°25′39″N 10°23′47″E
  - elevation: 452 m above sea level (NN)
- Mouth
  - location: Confluence: with the Swabian Rezat in Georgensgmünd to form the Rednitz
  - coordinates: 49°11′17″N 11°01′20″E
  - elevation: 342 m above sea level (NN)
- Length: 77.3 km (48.0 mi)
- Basin size: 456 km^{2} (176 sq mi)
- Discharge
  - location: at Ansbach (26.3 % of the catchment) gauge
  - average: 744 L/s (26.3 cu ft/s)
  - minimum: Record low: 20 L/s (0.71 cu ft/s); Average low: 158 L/s (5.6 cu ft/s)
  - maximum: Average high: 19.9 m^{3}/s (700 cu ft/s); Record high: 60.0 m^{3}/s (2,120 cu ft/s) (in 1941)

Basin features
- Progression: Rednitz→ Regnitz→ Main→ Rhine→ North Sea
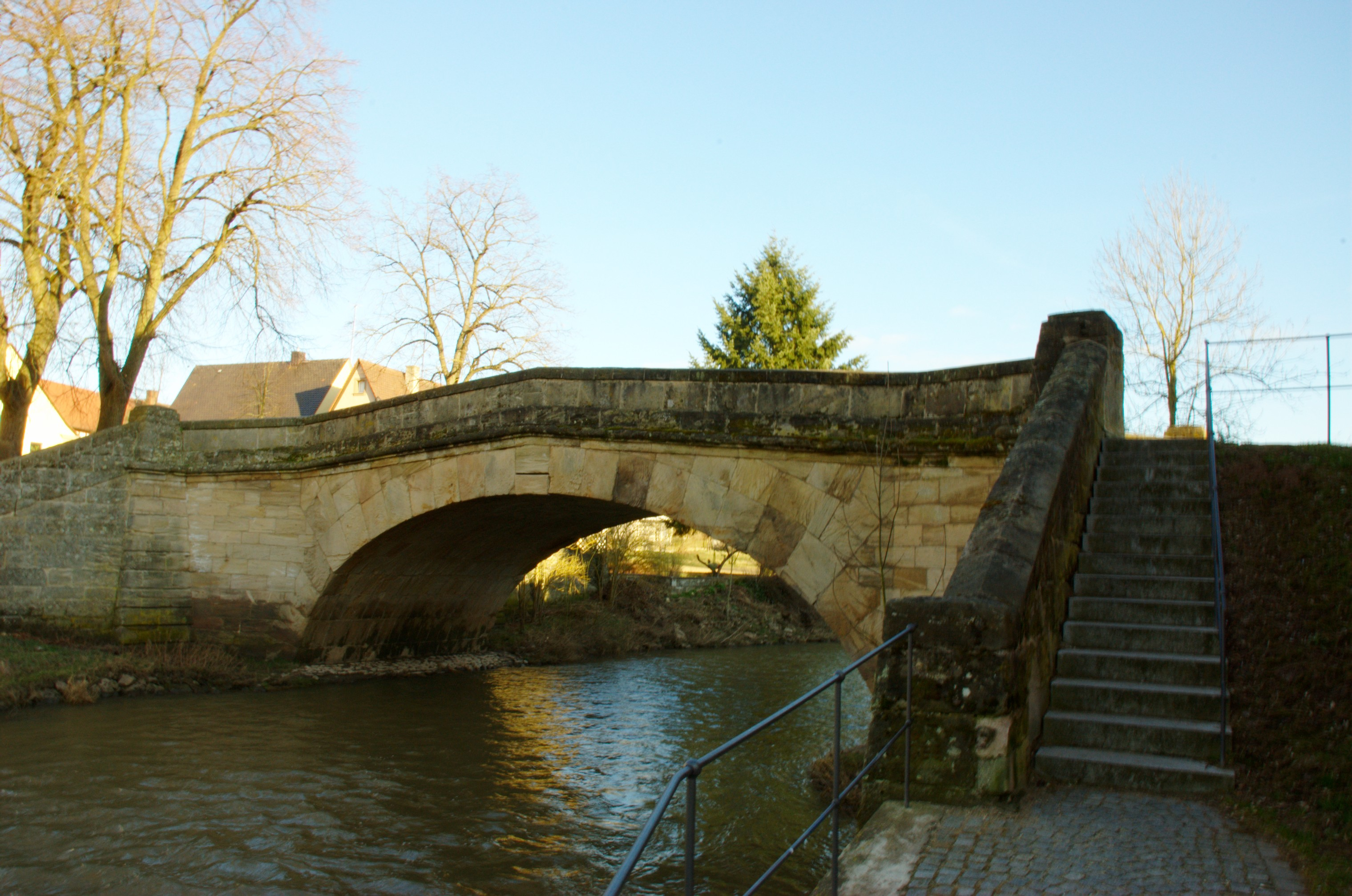
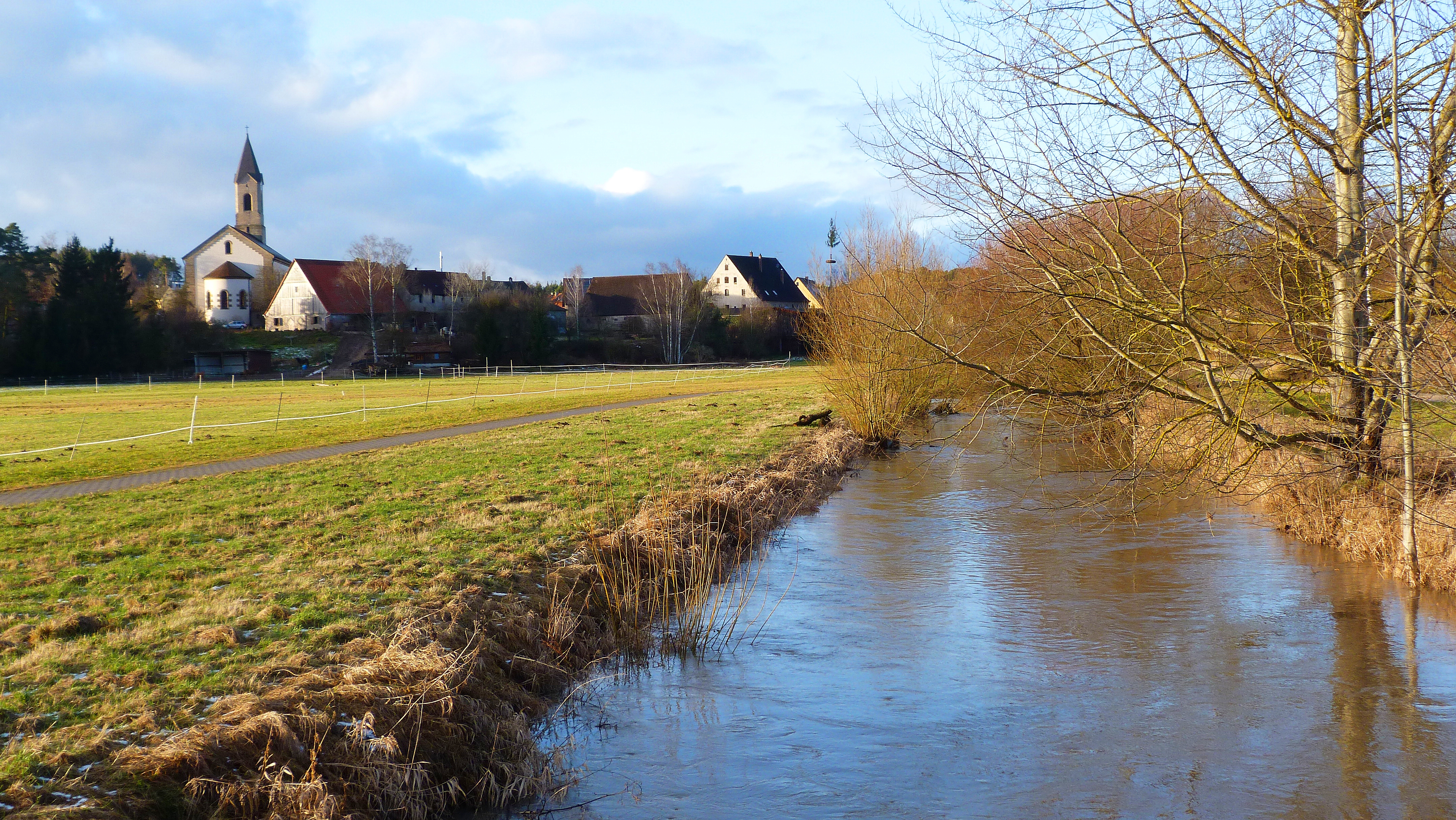
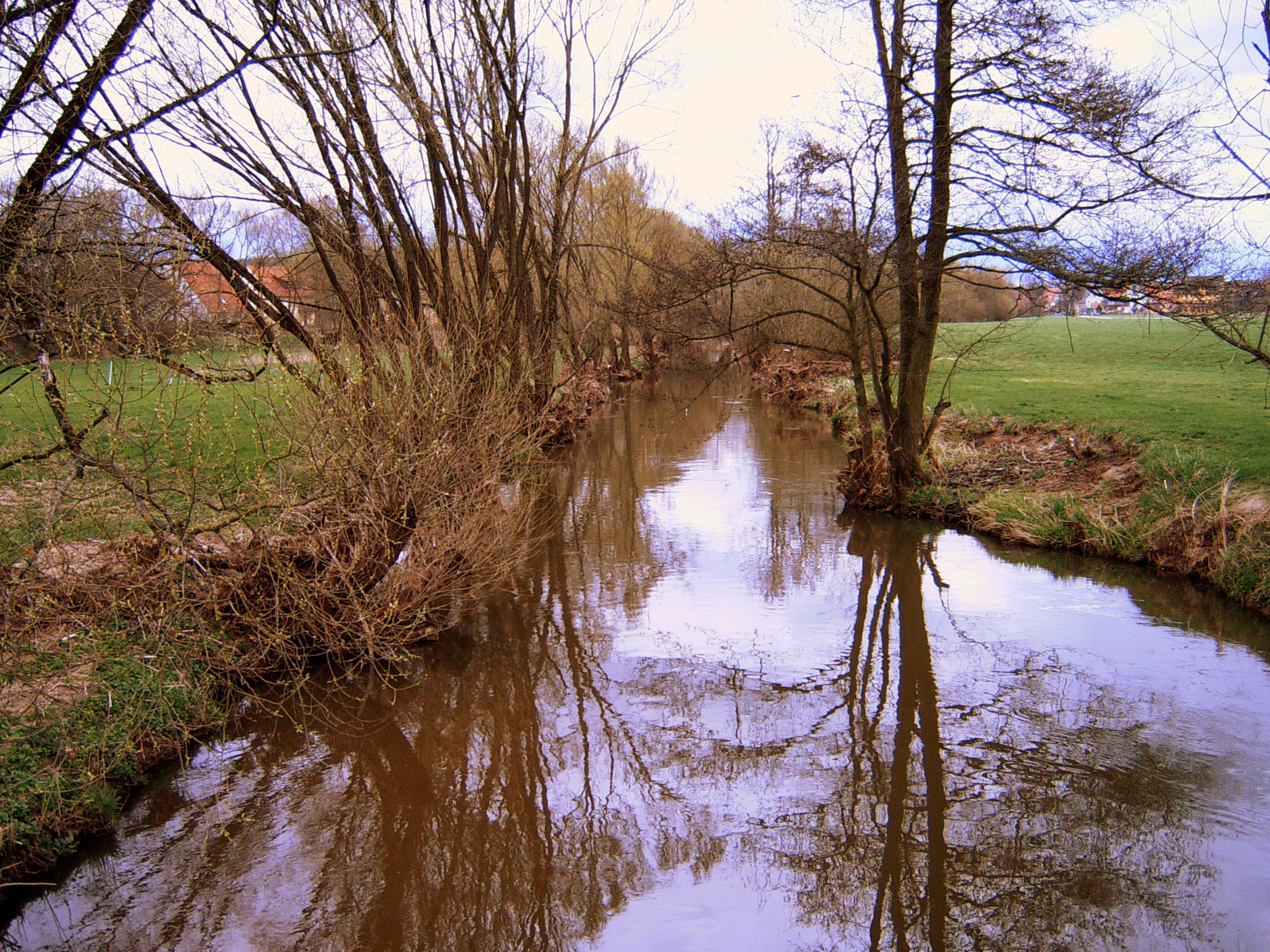
- The Markgrafen Bridge at Windsbach The Franconian Rezat near Wassermungenau The Franconian Rezat near Georgensgmünd

The Franconian Rezat (German: Fränkische Rezat, pronounced [ˈfʁɛŋkɪʃə ˈʁɛtsat]) is a 77-kilometre-long (48 mi) river in southern Germany. It is the western, left source river of the Rednitz. It rises in the Franconian Heights near Oberdachstetten. It flows generally east through the towns Lehrberg, Ansbach, Windsbach and Spalt. Together with the Swabian Rezat (Schwäbische Rezat), it forms the Rednitz in Georgensgmünd.

== See also ==
- List of rivers of Bavaria
