= Ettenstatt =

- Municipality
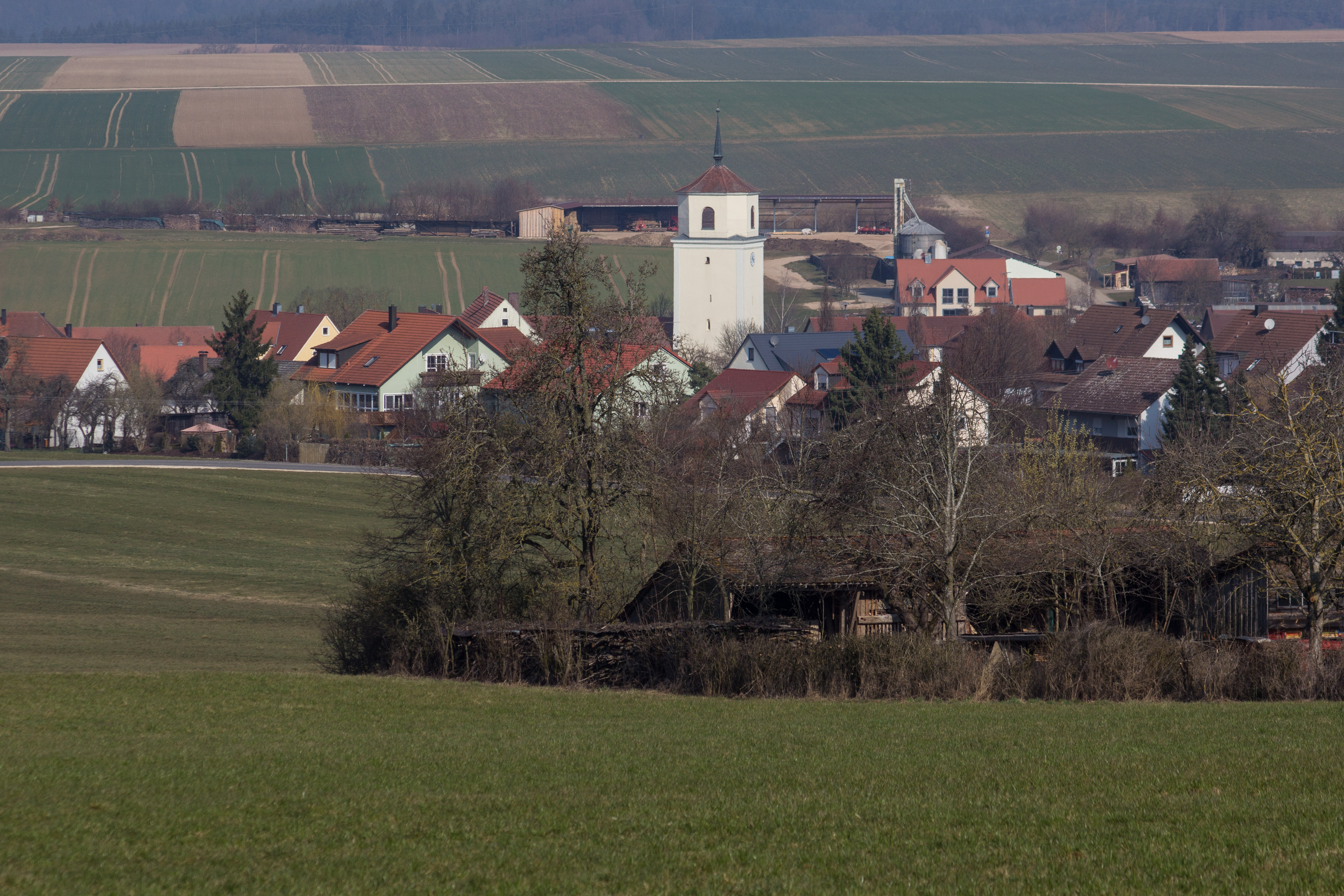
- Ettenstatt

- Coat of arms

- Location of Ettenstatt within Weißenburg-Gunzenhausen district
- Interactive map of Ettenstatt
- Location within Germany Location within Bavaria
- Coordinates: 49°05′N 11°03′E
- Country: Germany
- State: Bavaria
- Admin. region: Mittelfranken
- District: Weißenburg-Gunzenhausen
- Municipal assoc.: Ellingen
- Subdivisions: 10 Ortsteile

Government
  - Mayor (2020–26): Wilhelm Maderholz

Area
  - Total: 15.84 km^{2} (6.12 sq mi)
- Elevation: 440 m (1,440 ft)

Population (2025-12-31)
  - Total: 886
  - Density: 55.9/km^{2} (145/sq mi)
- Time zone: UTC+01:00 (CET)
  - Summer (DST): UTC+02:00 (CEST)
- Postal codes: 91796
- Dialling codes: 09148
- Vehicle registration: WUG
- Website: www.ettenstatt.de

Ettenstatt is a municipality in the Weißenburg-Gunzenhausen district, in Bavaria, Germany.
