= Großer Brombachsee =

Reservoir in northern Bavaria, Germany

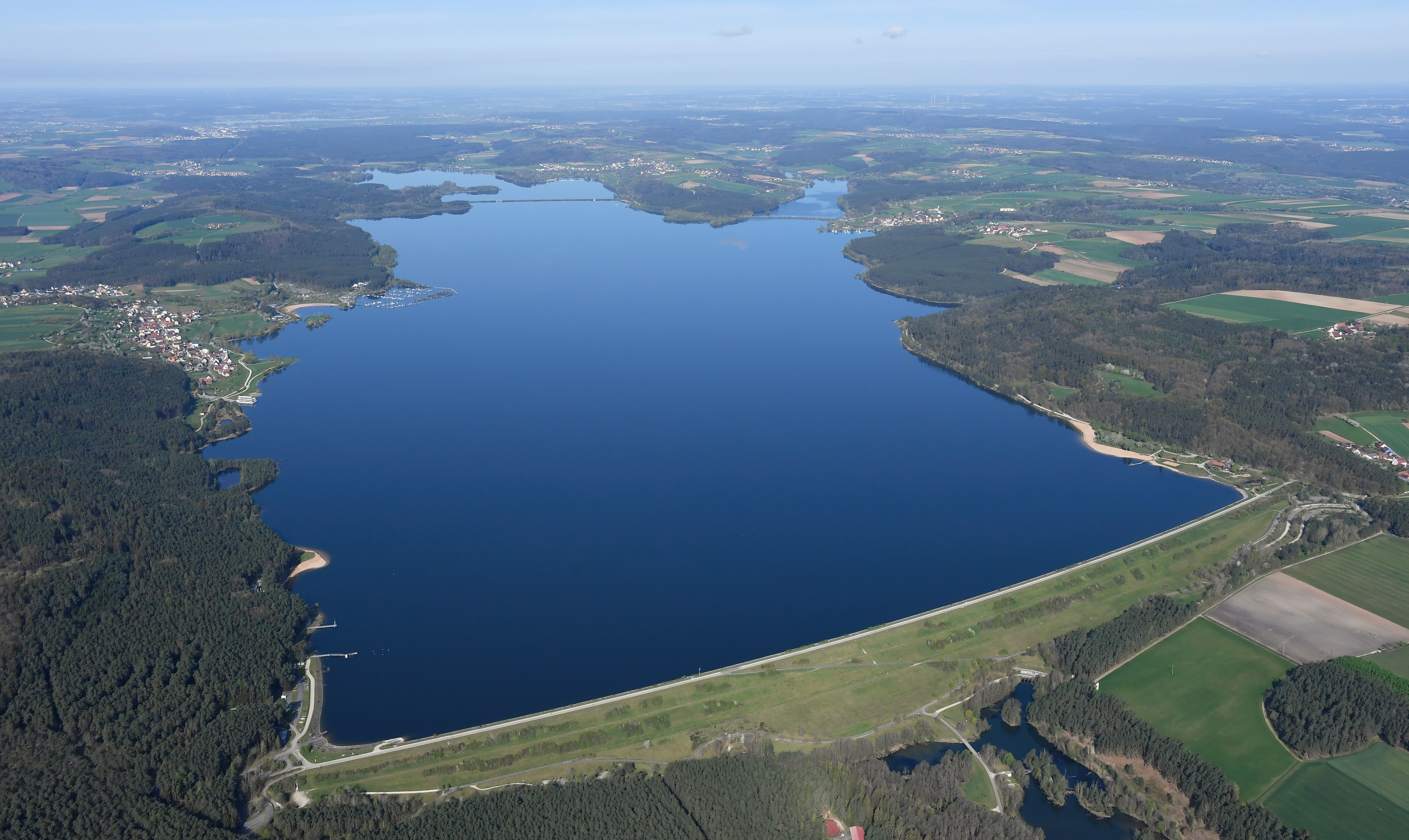

- Location within Germany
- Interactive map of Großer Brombachsee
- Location: Middle Franconia, Bavaria, Germany
- Coordinates: 49.130847°N 10.935173°E
- Construction began: 1983
- Opening date: 1999

Dam and spillways
- Type of dam: Gravity dam
- Impounds: Brombach
- Height: 36 m (118 ft)
- Length: 1,700 m (5,577 ft)
- Width (base): 200 m (656 ft)
- Dam volume: 3,500,000 m^{3} (120,000,000 ft^{3})

Reservoir
- Creates: Großer Brombachsee
- Total capacity: 132,000,000 m^{3} (4.7×10^{9} ft^{3})
- Catchment area: 627 km^{2} (242 mi^{2})
- Surface area: 9 km^{2} (3 mi^{2})

Großer Brombachsee is a reservoir in the Franconian Lake District in northern Bavaria, Germany. It is fed and drained by the Brombach. Together with its two pre-dams, the Kleiner Brombachsee and the Igelsbachsee, it forms the region Brombachsee.

== Description ==
Inaugurated in 2000, the Brombachsee is the largest reservoir in the Franconian Lake District and the largest still water in Franconia. The lake is one of the largest dams in Germany, both in terms of surface area and storage volume. In addition to flood protection in the Altmühl valley, its main purpose is to regulate water levels in northern Bavaria, where rainfall is low. For this purpose, the lake can be filled across the continental divide (North Sea-Black Sea catchments) from the Altmühl via the Altmühlsee up to an above-sea-level surface of 410.5 metres. Via smaller distributaries, water can be released into the Regnitz, which flows into the Main, up to the drawdown limit of 403.5 m. In addition to water management purposes, the lake is used for recreation, leisure and fishing.
