= Georgensgmünd =

- Municipality
- Coat of arms

- Location of Georgensgmünd within Roth district
- Interactive map of Georgensgmünd
- Location within Germany Location within Bavaria
- Coordinates: 49°11′N 11°0′E
- Country: Germany
- State: Bavaria
- Admin. region: Mittelfranken
- District: Roth
- Subdivisions: 13 districts

Government
  - Mayor (2023–29): Friedrich Koch

Area
  - Total: 46.89 km^{2} (18.10 sq mi)
- Elevation: 358 m (1,175 ft)

Population (2025-12-31)
  - Total: 6,891
  - Density: 147.0/km^{2} (380.6/sq mi)
- Time zone: UTC+01:00 (CET)
  - Summer (DST): UTC+02:00 (CEST)
- Postal codes: 91166
- Dialling codes: 09172
- Vehicle registration: RH
- Website: www.georgensgmuend.de

Georgensgmünd (German pronunciation: [ˈɡeːɔʁɡn̩sˌɡmʏnt]) is a municipality in the district of Roth, in Bavaria, Germany.

== Mayors ==
- 1972-1990: Fritz Schönwald (SPD)
- 1990-2008: Klaus Wernard (SPD)
- 2008-2011: Eva Loch (CSU)
- 2011-2023: Ben Schwarz (SPD)
- since 2023: Friedrich Koch

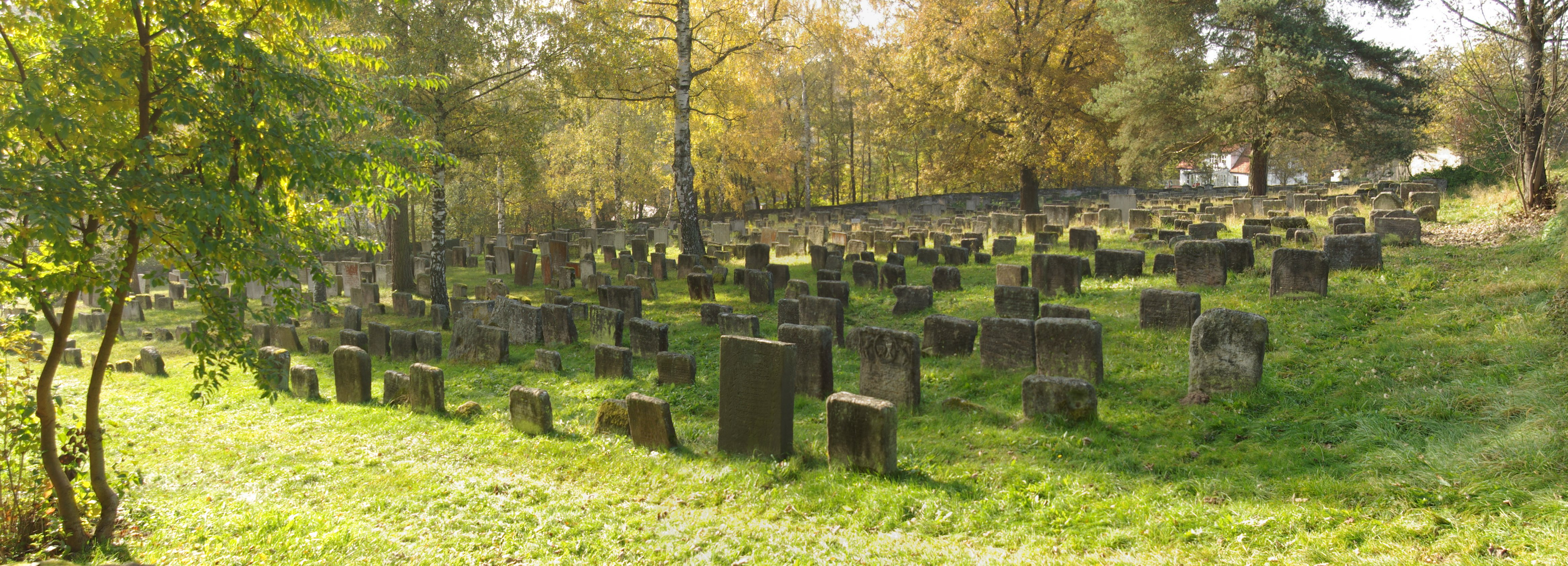
Georgensgmünd Jewish cemetery (2011)
