= Swabian Rezat =

River in Germany

Swabian Rezat (Schwäbische Rezat)
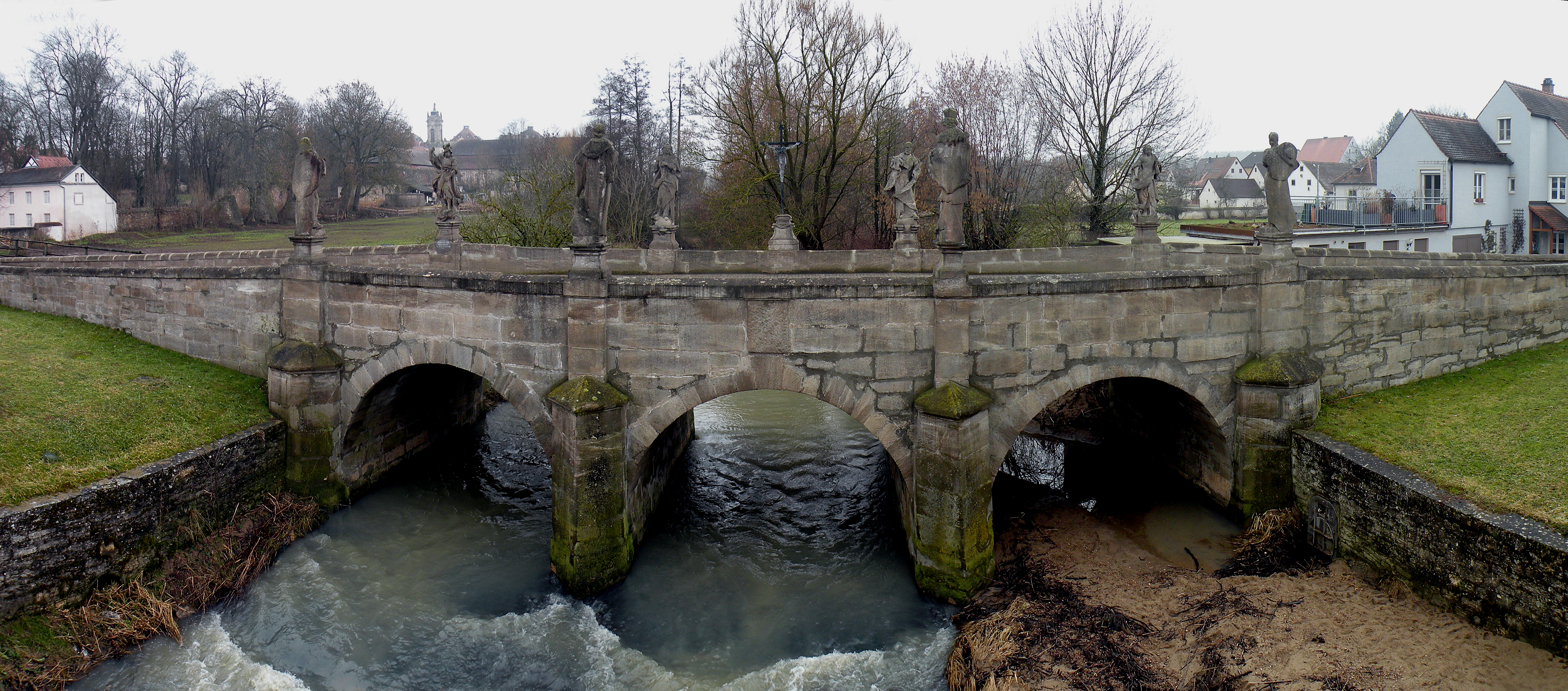
- Bridge over the Swabian Rezat in Ellingen

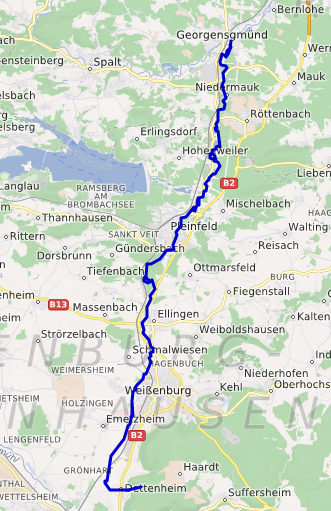

Location
- Country: Germany
- State: Bavaria

Physical characteristics
- Source
  - location: Franconian Jura
- Mouth
  - location: Rednitz
  - coordinates: 49°11′17″N 11°1′19″E
- Length: 33.3 km (20.7 mi)
- Basin size: 285 km^{2} (110 sq mi)

Basin features
- Progression: Rednitz→ Regnitz→ Main→ Rhine→ North Sea
- Tributaries
  - left: Brombach
  - right: Felchbach

The Swabian Rezat (German: Schwäbische Rezat, pronounced [ˈʃvɛːbɪʃə ˈʁɛtsat]) is a 33.3-kilometre-long river in southern Germany (Bavaria). It is the southern, right source river of the Rednitz. It rises in the Franconian Jura hills, near Weißenburg in Bayern. It flows generally north through the towns Weißenburg in Bayern, Ellingen and Pleinfeld. Together with the Franconian Rezat, it forms the Rednitz in Georgensgmünd.

In its upper course the Rezat is close to the continental water shed between Rhine and Danube. In the 8th century Charlemagne tried to build a canal between Rezat and Altmühl which were only 3 km away from each other. It's not clear if it was finished and used for a short period or not. Its remains can be seen as "Fossa Carolina" or "Karlsgraben" near Treuchtlingen.

== Tributaries ==
The following rivers are tributaries to the river Swabian Rezat (from source to mouth):

- Left: Weimersheimer Bach, Mittelbühlgraben, Walkershöfer Weihergraben, Vorderer Troppelgraben, Hinterer Troppelgraben, Banzerbach, Brombach
- Right: Felchbach, Ottmarsfelder Graben, Arbach, Iglseebach, Roter Graben

== See also ==
- List of rivers of Bavaria
