= Rednitz =

River in Germany

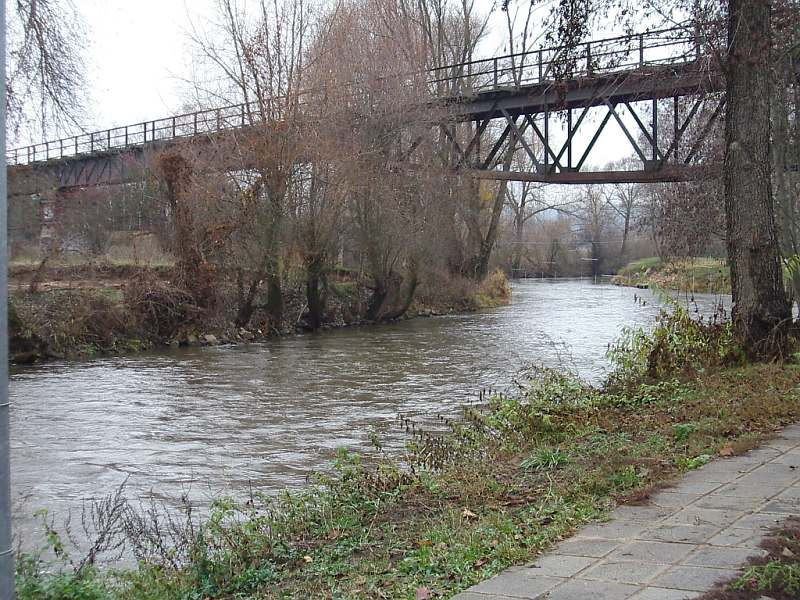
- Canoe course and old railway bridge in Fürth-Weikershof

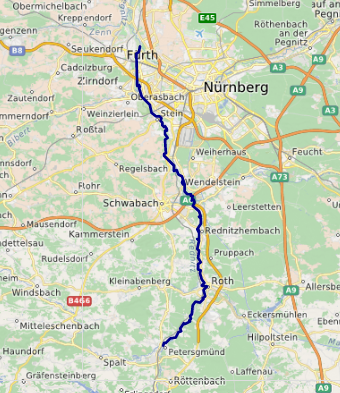

Location
- Country: Germany

Physical characteristics
- Mouth
  - location: Regnitz
  - coordinates: 49°29′11″N 10°59′12″E
- Length: 46.4 km (28.8 mi)
- Basin size: 2,118 km^{2} (818 sq mi)

Basin features
- Progression: Regnitz→ Main→ Rhine→ North Sea

The Rednitz (German pronunciation: [ˈʁeːdnɪts]) is a 46 km (29 mi) long river in Franconia, Germany, tributary of the Regnitz (more precisely: its southern, left headstream). Slightly richer in water than the other source river Pegnitz and also richer in tributaries, it is hydrographically regarded as the upper reaches of the Regnitz, although the longest flow path in its system is approx. 3 km shorter than that in the Pegnitz system. The Rednitz is formed by the confluence of the rivers Franconian Rezat and Swabian Rezat, in Georgensgmünd (district of Roth). The Rednitz flows north through Roth bei Nürnberg, Schwabach and the southwestern quarters of Nuremberg. The Rednitz joins the Pegnitz to form the Regnitz in Fürth.

The river first appeared in written sources in the 8th century with the Latin name Radantia. In the 11th century, the name of the river was given as Ratenza.

== Sources ==
Franz X. Bogner: Rednitz und Regnitz. Eine Luftbildreise von Weißenburg bis Bamberg. Luftbildband. Verlag Fränkischer Tag, Bamberg 2007 ISBN 978-3-936897-47-0

== See also ==
- List of rivers of Bavaria
