= Regnitz =

River in Germany

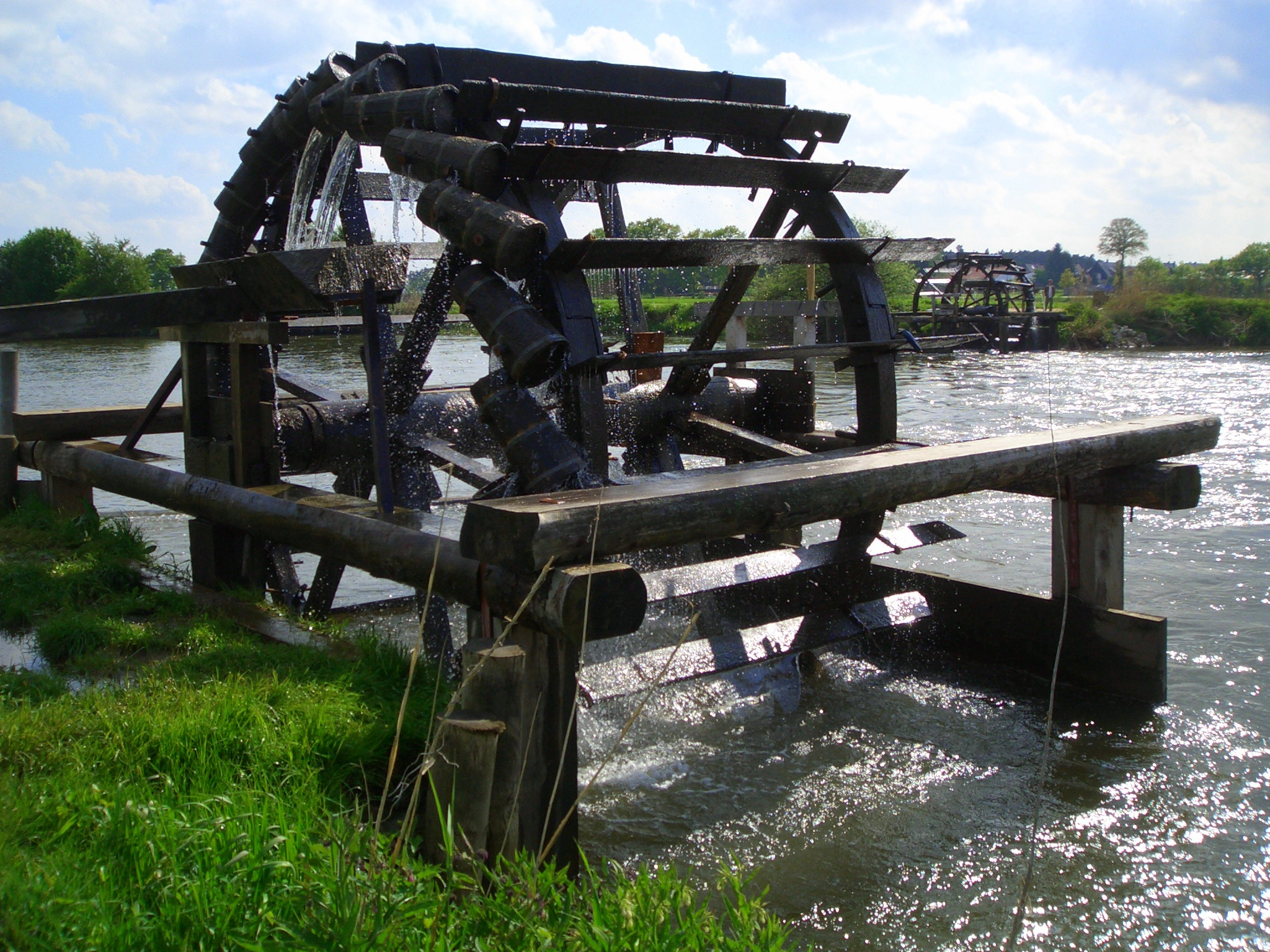
- Noria in the Regnitz near Möhrendorf

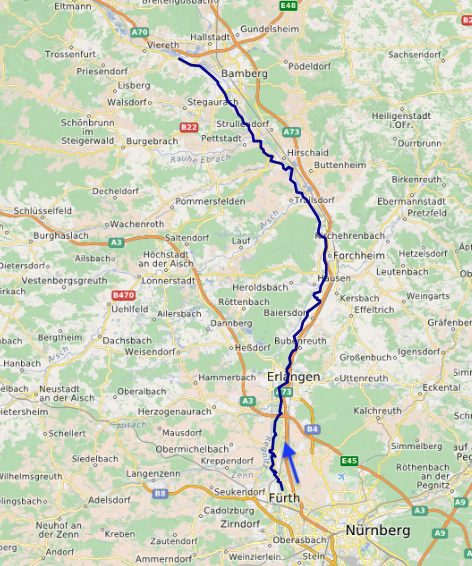

Location
- Country: Germany

Physical characteristics
- Source
  - location: Franconia
  - elevation: ±290 m (950 ft)
- Mouth
  - location: Main
  - coordinates: 49°54′51″N 10°49′47″E
- Length: 63.7 km (39.6 mi)
- Basin size: 7,521 km^{2} (2,904 sq mi)

Basin features
- Progression: Main→ Rhine→ North Sea

The Regnitz (German pronunciation: [ˈʁeːɡnɪts]) is a river in Franconia, Germany. It is a left tributary of the Main and is 63.7 km (39.6 mi) in length.

The river is formed by the confluence of the rivers Rednitz and Pegnitz, which meet in the city of Fürth. From there the Regnitz runs northwards through the cities of Erlangen and Forchheim. It finally meets the Main near the city of Bamberg. Including its source rivers Rednitz and Franconian Rezat, it is 187.4 km (116.4 mi) long, providing the furthest source (and hence length) of the Main's river system, the largest and longest right bank tributary of the river Rhine.

Small portions of the Regnitz near Bamberg are incorporated into a canal connecting the Main with the Danube: the Rhine-Main-Danube Canal, which otherwise runs parallel from Bamberg to Fürth.

Between Fürth and Forchheim many norias for drawing water up were used from the Middle Ages until the 19th century. Some are still there or were reconstructed.

The origin of the name is uncertain. The first written evidence of the name refers to a large farm on the river. It is first mentioned in a Latin document from 1160 as Rekinzi. It may be based on Slavic Rakonica ('crab river').

== Sources ==
- Bogner, Franz X. (2007): Rednitz und Regnitz. Eine Luftbildreise von Weißenburg bis Bamberg. Verlag Fränkischer Tag, Bamberg, ISBN 978-3-936897-47-0
