= Aurach (Rednitz) =

River in Germany

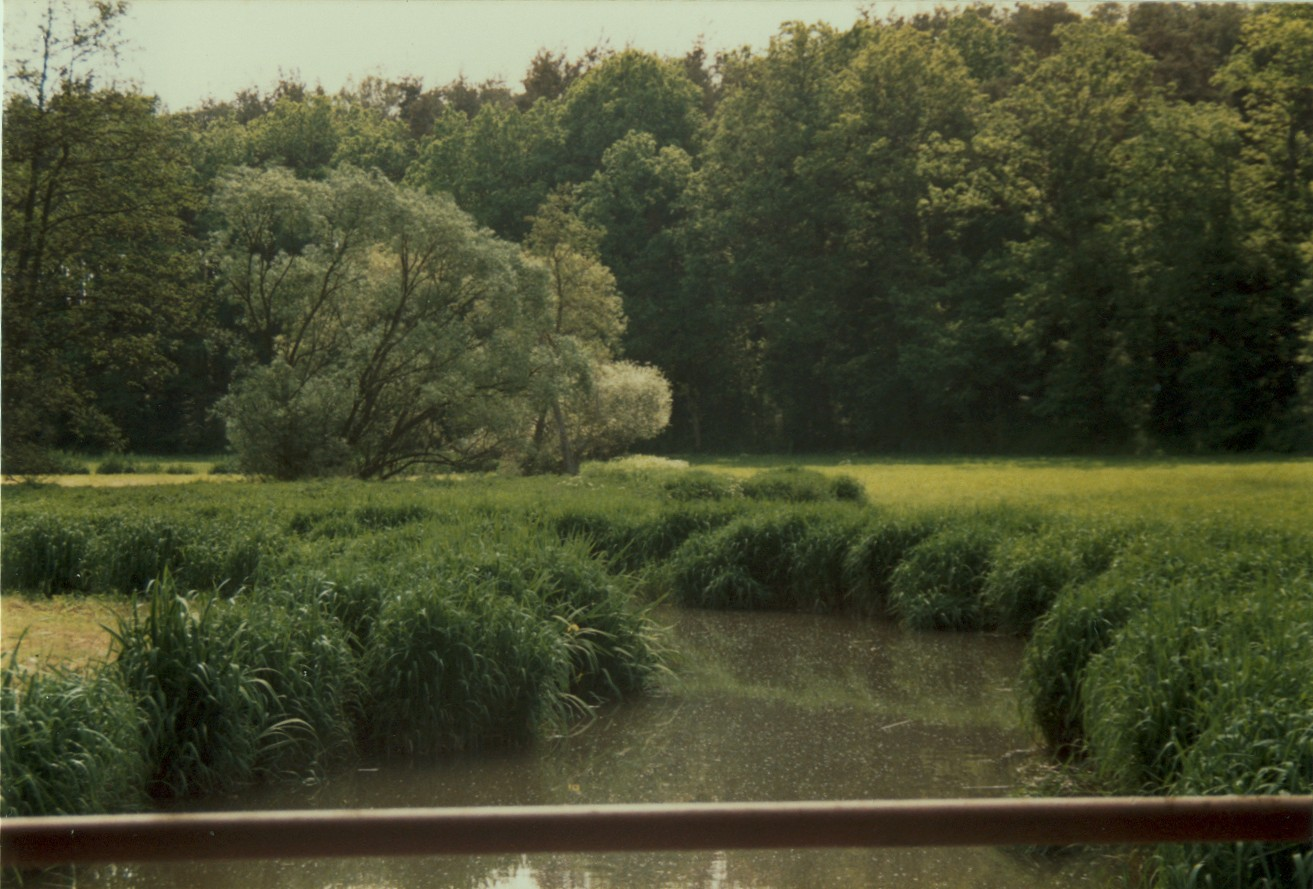
- Aurach near Roth

Location
- Country: Germany
- State: Bavaria

Physical characteristics
- Source
  - location: about 1 kilometre (0.6 mi) west of Petersaurach
  - elevation: 452 metres (1,483 ft)
- Mouth
  - location: somewhat north of Roth into the Rednitz
  - coordinates: 49.2542°N 11.0811°E
  - elevation: 324.5 metres (1,065 ft)
- Length: 31.8 km (19.8 mi)
- Basin size: 128 km^{2} (49 sq mi)

Basin features
- Progression: Rednitz→ Regnitz→ Main→ Rhine→ North Sea

Aurach (German pronunciation: [ˈaʊʁax]) is a river in the Bavarian Landkreise (districts) of Ansbach and Roth, Germany.

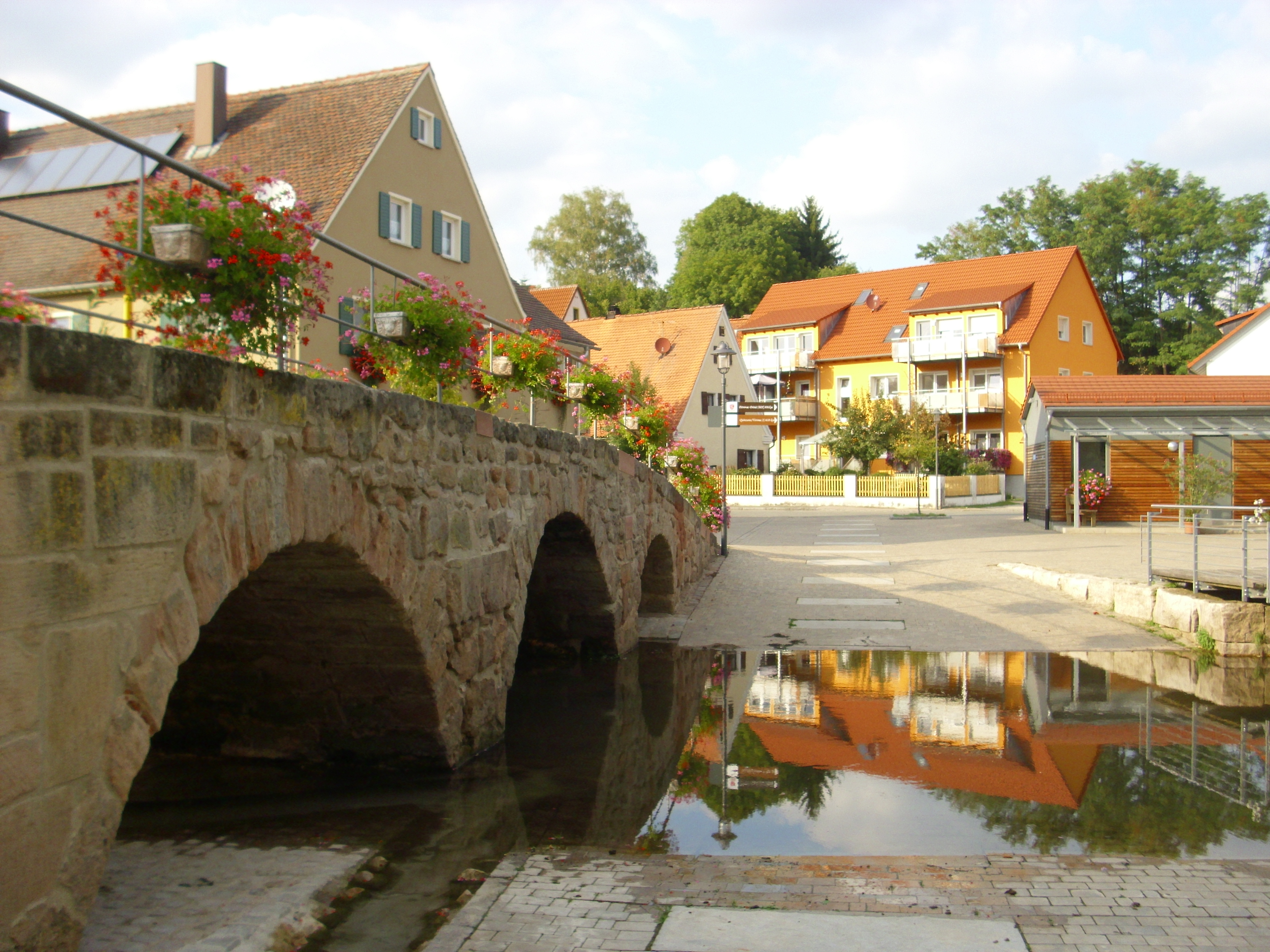
The Aurach at Barthelmesaurach

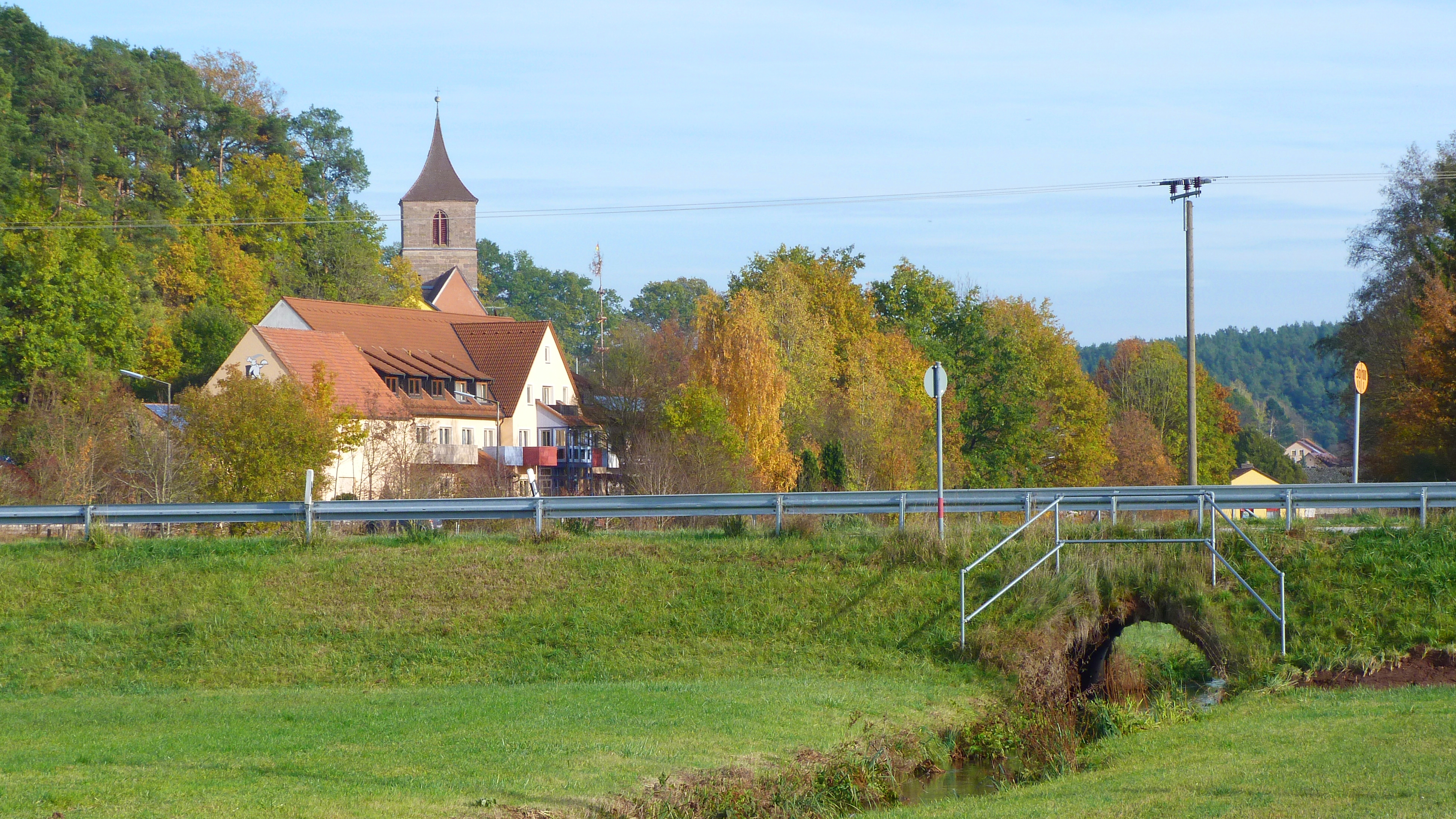
The Aurach at Veitsaurach

The name means 'river where the aurochs grazes' (Old High German ūro 'aurochs' and aha 'flowing water').

The Aurach originates about 1 kilometre (0.6 mi) west of Petersaurach, Middle Franconia, at an altitude of 452 metres (1,483 ft) above sea level. It flows almost 32 kilometres (20 mi) eastward until it flows into the Rednitz. On its way, it passes the villages of Aich and Wollersdorf (Neuendettelsau), Bertholdsdorf and Veitsaurach (Windsbach), Barthelmesaurach (Kammerstein), Gauchsdorf (Büchenbach) and Rothaurach (Roth). Downstream of Götzenreuth (Büchenbach), it is the receiving water of the southern flank of the Heidenberg. It flows to the northern edge of Roth at 325 metres (1,066 ft) above sea level from the left into the Rednitz.

Like most of the western tributaries of the Rednitz, the Aurach has a small slope and a small runoff as well as sand structures in the waterfront and in the waters of the river.

In the past, the Aurach drove a mill about every two miles. These were for example the Hammerschmiede, Geichsenmühle, Mausenmühle, Steinmühle, Buckenmühle, Hasenmühle, Neumühle, and Hebresmühle as well as those at Gauchsdorf and Rothaurach and the Lohmühle near Roth. Today, the hydropower of Aurach has lost its importance.

At Petersaurach, Mausendorf, Veitsaurach, Barthelmesaurach, Götzenreuth, Breitenlohe, Aurau, and Rothaurach, the Aurach takes up the purified sewage water from the respective purification plants.

The majority of the course of the river Aurach in the district of Roth is located in the landscape protection area No. 00428.01.

== See also ==
- List of rivers of Bavaria
