= Windsbach =

- Town
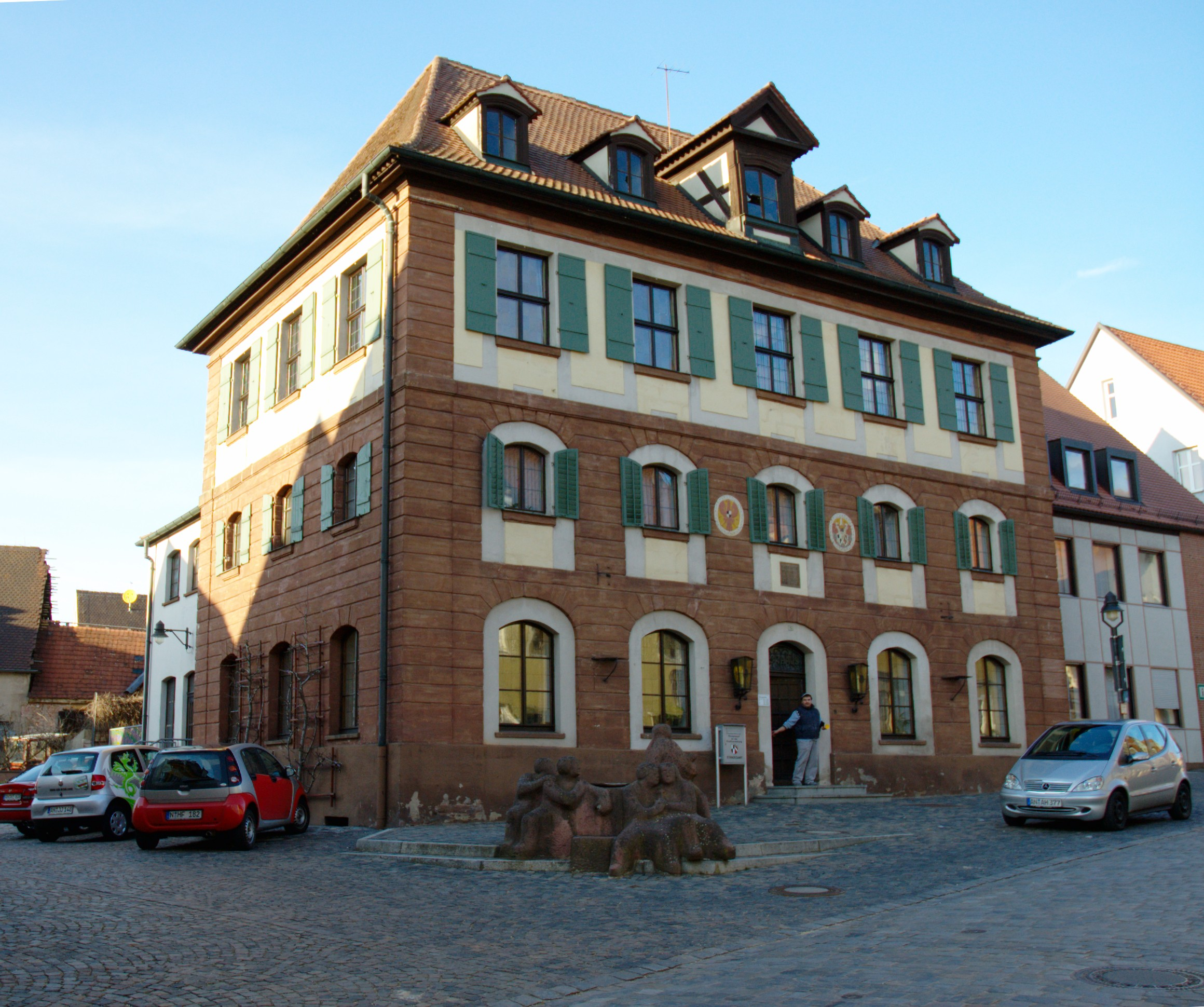
- Town hall

- Coat of arms

- Location of Windsbach within Ansbach district
- Interactive map of Windsbach
- Location within Germany Location within Bavaria
- Coordinates: 49°15′N 10°49′E
- Country: Germany
- State: Bavaria
- Admin. region: Mittelfranken
- District: Ansbach

Government
  - Mayor (2020–26): Matthias Seitz (SPD)

Area
  - Total: 68.12 km^{2} (26.30 sq mi)
- Elevation: 383 m (1,257 ft)

Population (2025-12-31)
  - Total: 6,110
  - Density: 89.7/km^{2} (232/sq mi)
- Time zone: UTC+01:00 (CET)
  - Summer (DST): UTC+02:00 (CEST)
- Postal codes: 91575
- Dialling codes: 09871, 09876 (Kitschendorf)
- Vehicle registration: AN, DKB, FEU, ROT
- Website: www.windsbach.de

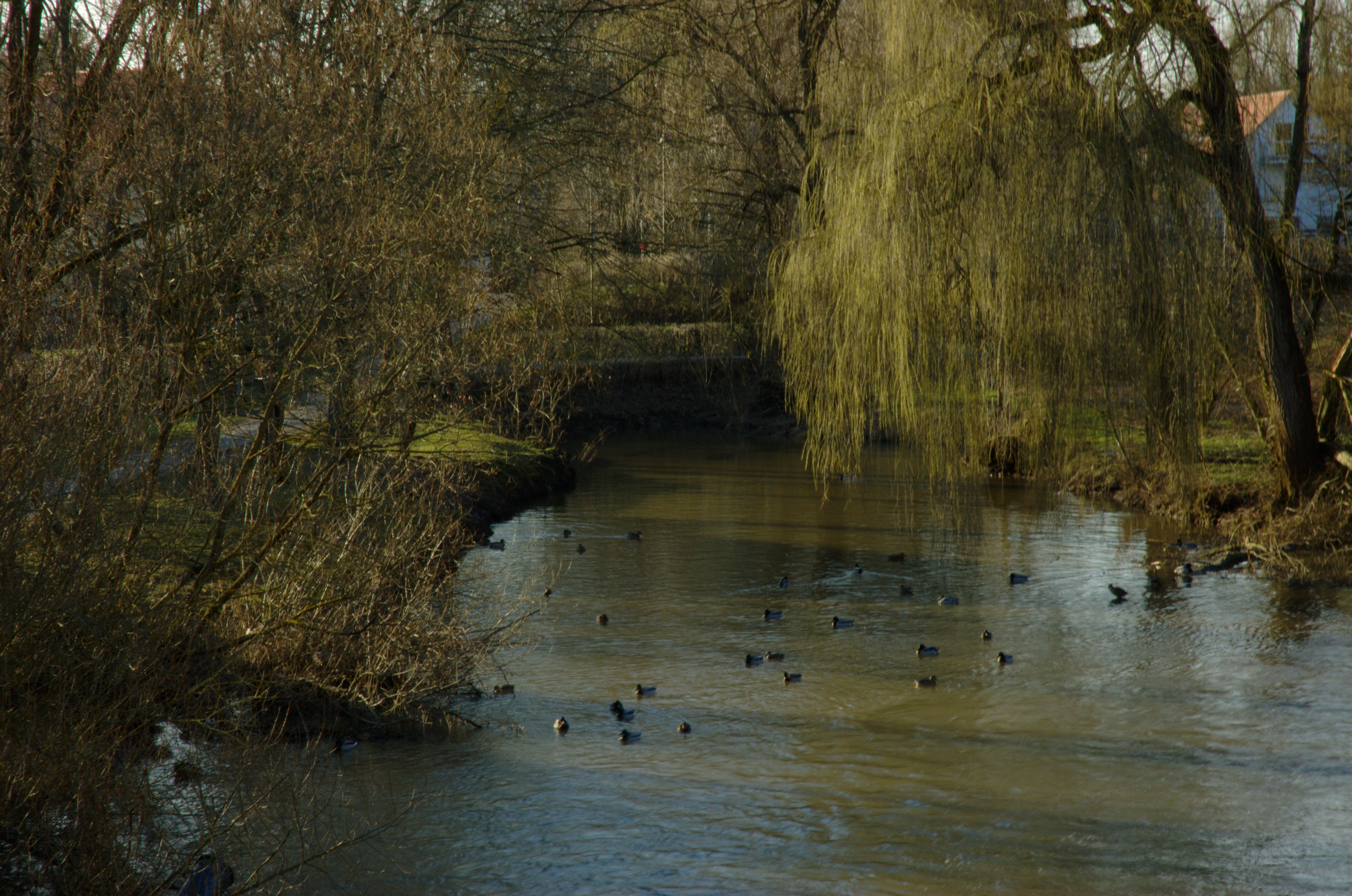
The Rezat river in Windsbach

Windsbach (German pronunciation: [ˈvɪntsbax]) is a town in the district of Ansbach, in Bavaria, Germany. It is situated 20 km east of Ansbach, and 29 km southwest of Nuremberg.

== Geography ==
=== Location ===
Windsbach is located in the Rangau area on the river Franconian Rezat. The city's position is 20 km eastward of the district capital Ansbach and 40 km southwestern of Nuremberg. Beside the Franconian Rezat the Aurach, a tributary of the Rednitz flows through the community area.

The following communities surround Windsbach (beginning north going clockwise direction): Rohr, Kammerstein, Abenberg, Spalt, Mitteleschenbach, Wolframs-Eschenbach, Lichtenau, Neuendettelsau and Heilsbronn.

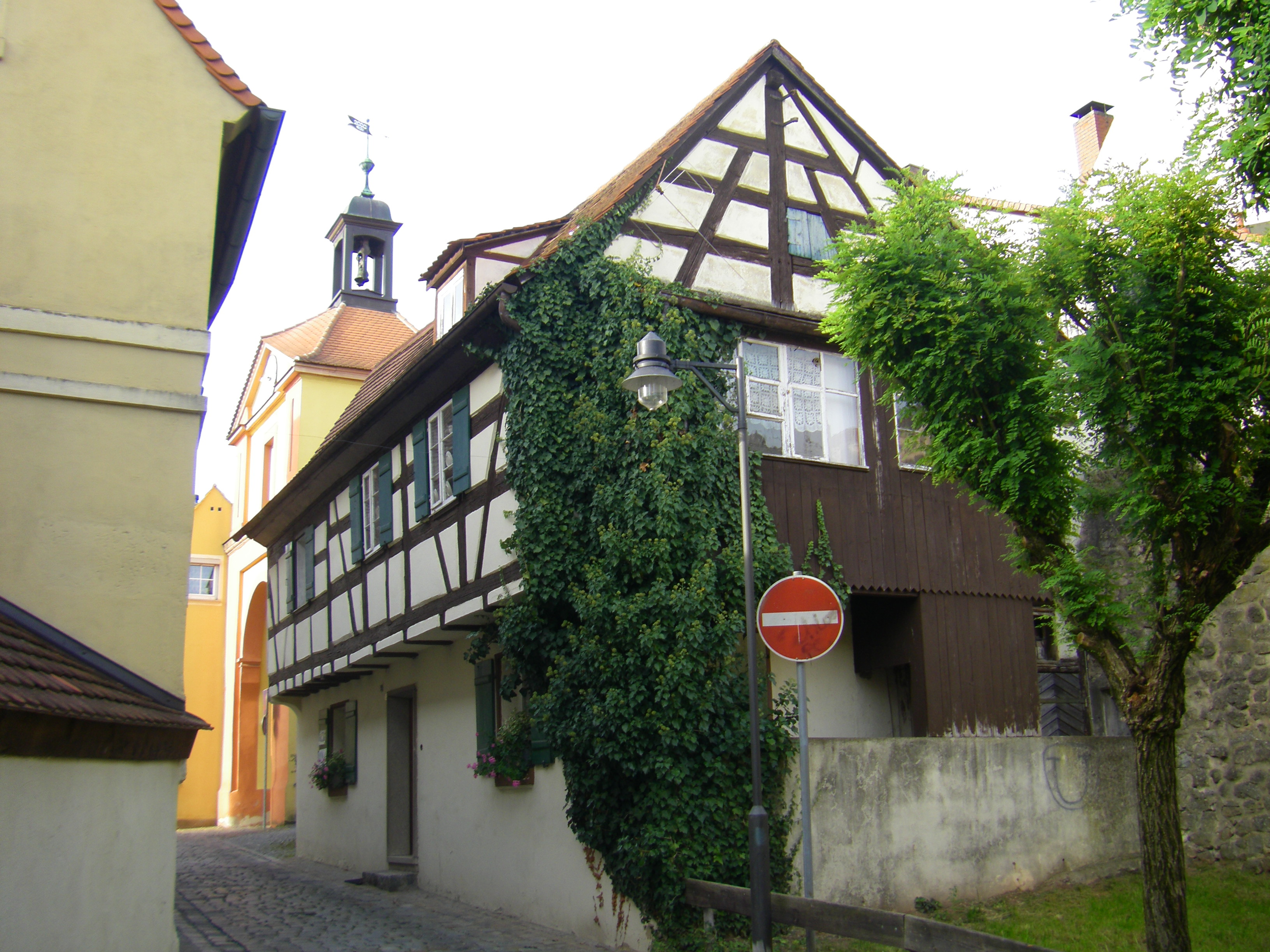
Kolbenstraße 52

=== Suburbs ===
Windsbach consists out of 29 suburbs:

- Bertholdsdorf
- Brunn
- Buckenmühle
- Elpersdorf
- Hergersbach
- Hölzleinsmühle
- Hopfenmühle
- Ismannsdorf
- Kettersbach
- Kitschendorf
- Kugelmühle
- Lanzendorf
- Leipersloh
- Moosbach
- Neuses
- Retzendorf
- Sauernheim
- Schwalbenmühle
- Speckheim
- Suddersorf
- Thonhof
- Untereschenbach
- Veitsaurach
- Waldhaus
- Wernsmühle
- Windsbach
- Winkelhaid
- Winterhof
- Wolfsau

== Politics ==
- First mayor: Matthias Seitz (SPD)
- Second mayor: Norbert Kleinöder (Hinterland of Windsbach)
- Third mayor: Karl Schuler (SPD)

=== City Council ===
The city council has (including the 1. Mayor) 21 members:

Party	Seats
CSU / Engaged Citizens	6
SPD / Independent Voters	6
Voter-Alliance Hinterland of Windsbach	4
Green Party	2
Free Voters / Citizen Fraction of Windsbach (WBB)	2

(Status: Municipal Elections of 2 March 2008)

== Famous institutions ==
Windsbach is famous for its high school, the Johann-Sebastian-Bach-Gymnasium, which is named after the composer Johann Sebastian Bach. It is one of the best schools in Bavaria and teaches among other things modern languages (for example English, French, Spanish), old languages (Latin, Old Greek), maths, physics and chemistry (of course there are much more standard subjects like history, geography, biology, religious education, P.E., art etc.).

Windsbach is also the home of the Windsbach Boys' Choir founded in 1946 and from 1978 to 2012 under the direction of Karl-Friedrich Beringer. The choir is one of the most renowned boys' choirs in the world.

== Memberships ==
Windsbach is member in the following institutions and organisations:

- German-American Society of West Middle Franconia e.V.
- Regional Community Alliance "kommA"
