= Marlene Mortler =

German politician of the CSU

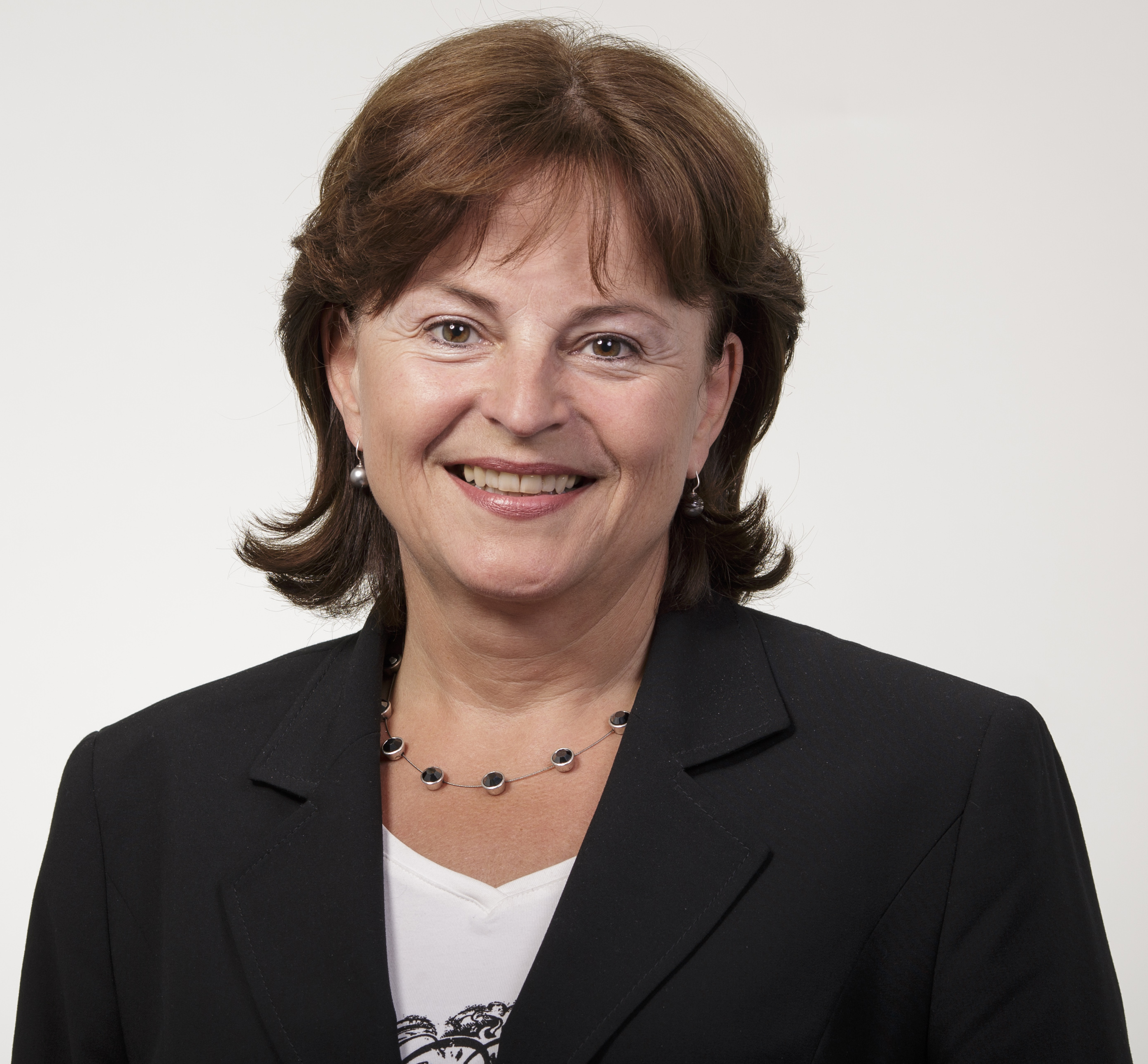
- Mortler in 2012

Member of the European Parliament; for Germany
- In office 2 July 2019 – 9 June 2024

Member of the Bundestag; for Roth
- In office 17 October 2002 – 1 July 2019
- Preceded by: Hansgeorg Hauser
- Succeeded by: Astrid Freudenstein

Personal details
- Born: Marlene Hengelein; 16 October 1955 (age 71) Lauf an der Pegnitz, West Germany
- Party: Christian Social Union; European People's Party
- Spouse: Siegfried Mortler (m. 1975; died 2017)
- Children: 3

Marlene Mortler (née Hengelein; born 16 October 1955) is a German politician of the Christian Social Union in Bavaria (CSU) who served as a Member of the European Parliament from 2019 to 2024 and as a member of the German Parliament from 2002 to 2019. She also served as Commissioner on Narcotic Drugs at the Federal Ministry of Health in the government of Chancellor Angela Merkel from 2014 until 2019.

== Early life and career ==
Mortler attended the agricultural school in 1981, in Roth and gained a master's certificate. In 1983, she took over her parents' farm in Dehnberg with her husband and focused on the production of grain and renewable resources.

== Political career ==
In 1989, Mortler joined the CSU, and in 1996, she became a member of the Women's Union.

From 1990 Mortler belonged to the district council of the district of Nürnberger Land. From 1996 to 2004 she served as first deputy district administrator of the district.

=== Member of the German Parliament (2002–2019) ===
In the 2002 national elections, Mortler became a member of the German Bundestag, representing the Roth district. In the Bundestag, she was a full member of the Committee on Food and Agriculture and Deputy Member of the Committee on Tourism. From 2004 to 2005, she served as the CSU group's spokesperson on agricultural and consumer protection policies. From 2005 to 2009, she was the chairwoman of the Committee on Tourism. She was also the CDU/CSU parliamentary group's spokeswoman on tourism from 2009 until 2013.

In addition to her committee assignments, Mortler was a member of the German-Maltese and German-Hungarian Parliamentary Friendship Group since February 2010.

Since June 2009, Mortler has been serving as deputy chairwoman of the CSU district association Middle Franconia, and in October 2011 she was elected as a member of the CSU Board under then chairman Horst Seehofer. In November 2011, she was appointed chairwoman of the party's working group on agriculture.

In the negotiations to form a coalition government following the 2009 federal elections, Mortler was part of the working group on the environment, agriculture and consumer protection, led by Ilse Aigner and Michael Kauch.

In addition to her parliamentary work, Mortler also served as Commissioner on Narcotic Drugs at the Federal Ministry of Health in the government of Chancellor Angela Merkel from 2014 until 2019; she was succeeded by Daniela Ludwig. In the negotiations to form a coalition government under the Merkel's leadership following the 2017 federal elections, she was part of the working group on municipalities and rural areas, led by Reiner Haseloff, Kurt Gribl and Michael Groschek.

Mortler was always elected as a directly elected representatives of the Roth constituency in the Bundestag. In the 2005 elections, she received 51.0% of the vote.

=== Member of the European Parliament (2019–2024) ===
In late 2018, Mortler announced that she would run for a parliamentary seat in the 2019 European elections. After becoming a Member of the European Parliament, she served on the Committee on Agriculture and Rural Development. In 2020, she also joined the Committee of Inquiry on the Protection of Animals during Transport.

In addition to her committee assignments, Mortler was part of the Parliament's Delegation for relations with South Africa. She was also part of the European Parliament Intergroup on Small and Medium-Sized Enterprises (SMEs).

In December 2023, Mortler announced that she would not stand in the 2024 elections but instead resign from active politics by the end of the parliamentary term.

== Other activities ==
=== Regulatory agencies ===
∗ Bavarian Regulatory Authority for Commercial Broadcasting (BLM), Member of the Supervisory Board

=== Non-profit organizations ===
- Versicherungskammer Bayern, Member of the Agricultural Advisory Board (-2012)

From 1982 until 2004, Mortler served as chairwoman of the rural women in the district Nürnberger Land and belonged from 1992 to 2012 as a district of the farmer Farmers Union Central Franconia and second deputy country farmer to the Bureau of the Bavarian Farmers Association (until 1997) on. From 1997 to 2012, she was the first deputy country farmer.

== Political positions ==
In her role as a Commissioner on Narcotic Drugs, Mortler soon became the target of diverse criticism. Given her previous focus on agriculture, she was criticized as unqualified for the position.

The German Cancer Aid has responded with praise to Mortler's initiative to ban tobacco advertising in Germany. Her initiative failed and nothing happened in this issue until April 2015. By 2014 they wanted to "hold intensive discussions in the federal government", she said in a Die Zeit article. In 2018, Mortler criticized the portrayal of smoking in television and film programs that received public funds and urged the German film industry to produce fewer scenes involving cigarettes.

By early 2015, Mortler came under heavy criticism which mostly arose from social media. Under the Twitter hashtag #Mortler and on Facebook many concerned individuals and organizations voiced their discontent with the commissioner. A petition which called for her resignation garnered over 14,000 votes within a few days. She was criticized for incompetence, an inappropriate qualification in "rural home economics" (German: Meisterin der Ländlichen Hauswirtschaft) for the job, having a double standard (because of her promotion of alcohol consumption) and a preoccupation concerning suggestions about cannabis legalization. A main point of criticism are her justifications for the illegality of cannabis in contrast to the legality of alcohol - in interviews she stated that (translated) "in contrast to Cannabis alcohol is part of our culture" and "Because Cannabis is an illegal drug. Full stop." Due to the severe criticism, Mortler deleted her Facebook account.

== Personal life ==
Mortler is Protestant. She was married to her husband Siegfried Mortler from 1975 until his death in June 2017. She is the mother of three children.
