= Hansgeorg Hauser =

German politician

Member of the Bundestag; for Roth
- In office 20 December 1990 – 17 October 2002
- Preceded by: Richard Stücklen
- Succeeded by: Marlene Mortler

Personal details
- Born: 20 June 1943 Rednitzhembach, Germany
- Died: 24 February 2021 (aged 77)
- Party: Christian Social Union
- Children: 2
- Education: University of Erlangen–Nuremberg

Hansgeorg Hauser (20 June 1943 – 24 February 2021) was a German politician, member of the CSU (Christian Social Union). He served as the Parliamentary State Secretary to the Federal Minister of Finance from 1995 to 1998.

== Life and work ==
After graduating from Adam-Kraft-Gymnasium in Schwabach in 1963, Hauser completed his military service and began studying Business Administration at the University of Erlangen-Nuremberg in 1965. He obtained his diploma in Business Administration in 1970.

Following this, he worked at the auditing firm Price Waterhouse until 1974. In 1975, he passed the exam to become a tax advisor and has been practicing as an independent tax consultant since then.

From 1 February 2000 to 30 June 2009, Hansgeorg Hauser served as the Representative of the Board of Commerzbank AG, responsible for maintaining relations with politics, parties, embassies, associations, and other public entities. Additionally, he oversaw the bank's liaison offices in Berlin and Brussels.

Following this role, from 1 July 2009 to 31 December 2012, Hauser worked as an independent consultant for politics and business.

Starting in 1993, Hauser was a member of the board of directors or supervisory board of the Rummelsberger Anstalten, eventually chairing the supervisory board. From 2005, he served as vice president and Treasurer of Special Olympics Germany. He was also a member of the Foundation Board of Lebenshilfe Nürnberger Land e. V. from 2004.

=== Member of Parliament ===
Hauser joined the CSU in 1982. From 1984 to 1989, he was a member of the CSU district executive in Roth and the district executive of Middle Franconia. From 1993, he was deputy chairman of the CSU district association in Roth.

Hauser was a member of the German Bundestag from 1990 to 2002, where he was chairman of the CDU/CSU parliamentary group's finance working group from 1993 to 1995.

Hansgeorg Hauser always entered the Bundestag as a directly elected member of the Roth constituency.

=== Public offices ===
On 15 November 1995, Hauser was appointed Parliamentary State Secretary to the Federal Minister of Finance in the Federal Government led by Chancellor Helmut Kohl. After the 1998 Bundestag elections, he left office on October 26, 1998.

== Awards ==
2015: Bavarian Order of Merit

== See also ==
- Fifth Kohl cabinet
