= Wendelstein, Bavaria =

Wendelstein
- Municipality
- Coat of arms

- Location of Wendelstein within Roth district
- Interactive map of Wendelstein
- Location within Germany Location within Bavaria
- Coordinates: 49°21′13″N 11°8′54″E
- Country: Germany
- State: Bavaria
- Admin. region: Mittelfranken
- District: Roth

Government
  - Mayor (2020–26): Werner Langhans (CSU)

Area
  - Total: 50.88 km^{2} (19.64 sq mi)
- Elevation: 330 m (1,080 ft)

Population (2025-12-31)
  - Total: 16,410
  - Density: 322.5/km^{2} (835.3/sq mi)
- Time zone: UTC+01:00 (CET)
  - Summer (DST): UTC+02:00 (CEST)
- Postal codes: 90530
- Dialling codes: 09129
- Vehicle registration: RH
- Website: www.wendelstein.de

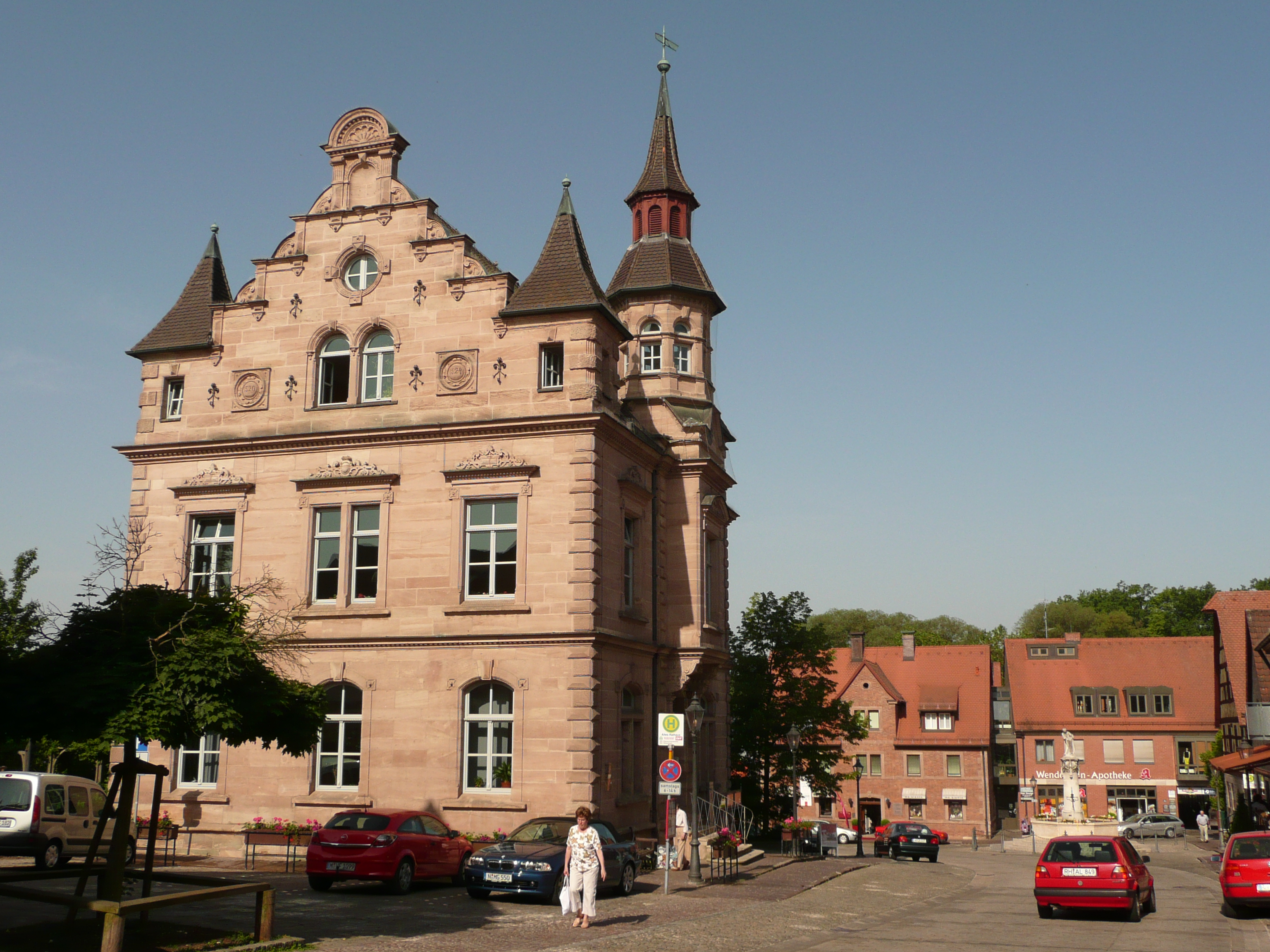
Center of Wendelstein

Wendelstein (German pronunciation: [ˈvɛndl̩ˌʃtaɪn]) is a municipality in the district of Roth, in Bavaria, Germany, located about 12 kilometres (7.5 mi) southeast of Nuremberg.

== Geography ==
Wendelstein is about 13 km south-southeast of the center of the city of Nuremberg in the Schwarzach Valley. To the north it borders Nuremberg, to the east Feucht, Schwarzenbruck and Pyrbaum, to the south Allersberg and Schwanstetten and to the west Rednitzhembach and Schwabach. The municipal area also includes an uninhabited exclave, one square kilometer in size, of Lorenzer Reichswald north of a former ammunition dump, Heeresmunitionsanstalt Feucht.

== Notable inhabitants ==
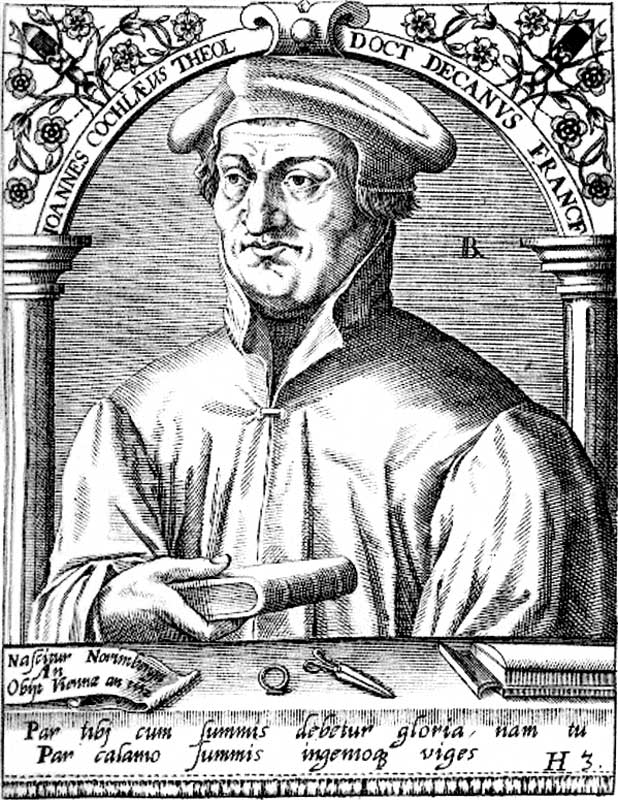
Johann Cochlaus

- Johann Cochlaus (1479–1552), humanist and theologian
