= Evelyn Schötz =

German politician (born 1961)

Member of the Bundestag from Bavaria
- Incumbent
- Assumed office 2025

Personal details
- Born: 30 June 1961 (age 64) Lauf an der Pegnitz, Bavaria, West Germany
- Party: Die Linke

Evelyn Schötz (born 30 June 1961) is a German politician from Die Linke. In the 2025 German federal election, she ran as a direct candidate in the constituency of Roth and won a seat in the 21st Bundestag by placing fifth on her party's Bavarian state list.

== Life ==
Before entering the Bundestag, Schötz worked as a geriatric nurse. She is also chairwoman of the Nuremberg district association of the Left Party.

Evelyn Schötz has been a member of the Association of Persecutees of the Nazi Regime – Federation of Antifascists (VVN-BdA) since 1996, a member of the former Public Services, Transport and Traffic Union (ÖTV), now United Services Union (ver.di), and the social association Sozialverband VdK Deutschland (VdK).

Schötz is married and has an adult son.
