= Bernd Fabritius =

German politician (born 1965)

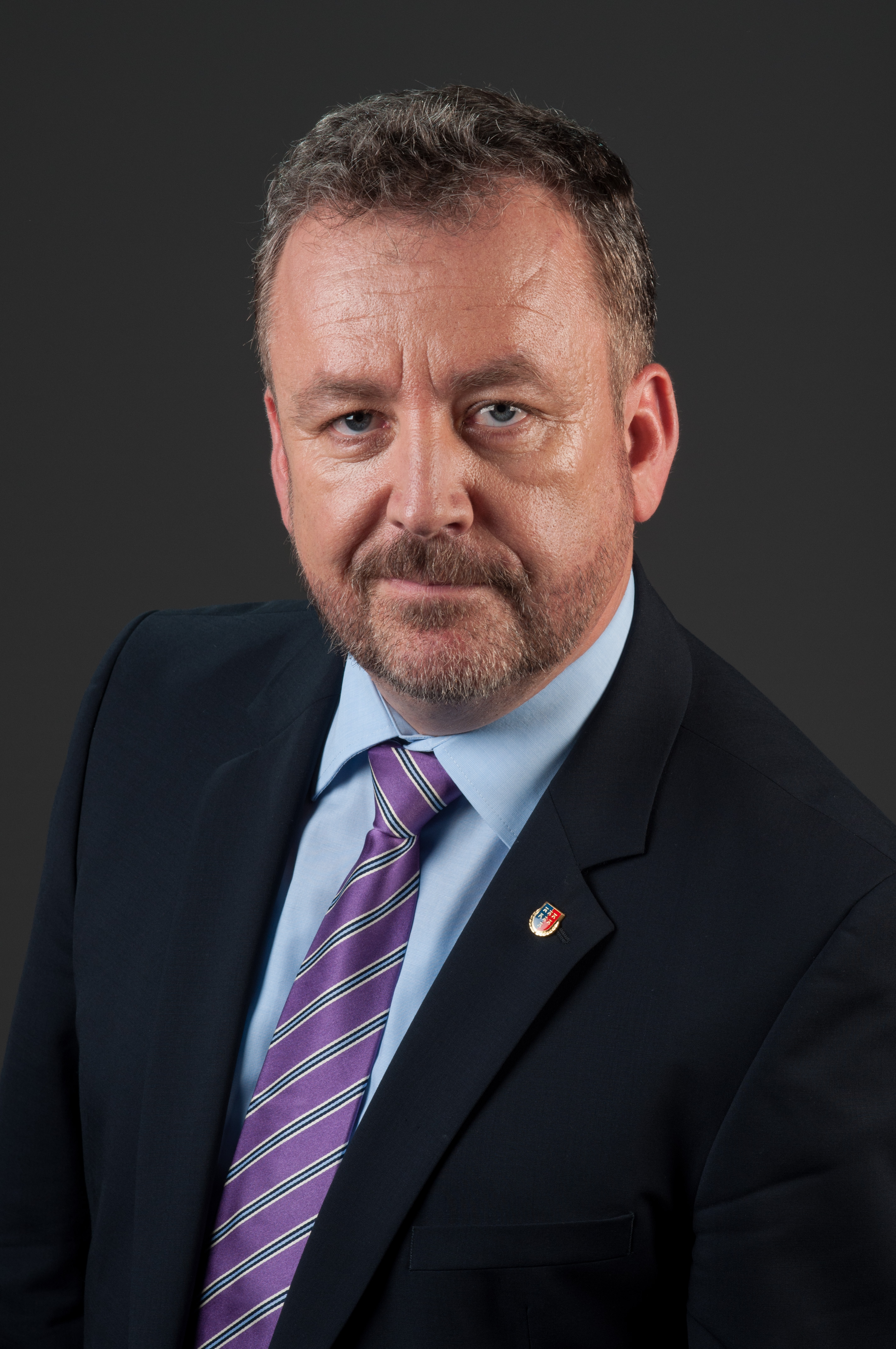
- Fabritius in 2014

Federal Government Commissioner for Matters Related to Ethnic German Resettlers and National Minorities
- In office 11 April 2018 – 14 April 2022
- Preceded by: Günter Krings
- Succeeded by: Natalie Pawlik

Member of the Bundestag; from Bavaria
- In office 22 March 2021 – 26 October 2021
- Preceded by: Tobias Zech
- Succeeded by: Ralph Edelhäußer
- Constituency: Roth
- In office 22 October 2013 – 24 October 2017
- Constituency: State list

President of the Federation of Expellees
- In office 7 November 2014 – October 2025
- Preceded by: Erika Steinbach
- Succeeded by: Stephan Mayer

Chairman of Landsmannschaft der Siebenbürger Sachsen in Deutschland
- Incumbent
- Assumed office 2007
- Preceded by: Volker Dürr

Personal details
- Born: 14 May 1965 (age 61) Agnita, Romania
- Party: Christian Social Union

Bernd Fabritius (born 14 May 1965) is a German lawyer and politician of the Christian Social Union of Bavaria (CSU) who has served as a Member of the Bundestag from 2013 to 2017 and again in 2021.

== Early life and education ==
Fabritius was born in Agnita, Sibiu County, Romania, and is a Transylvanian Saxon. His father was an insurance merchant and his mother was a bank clerk. He attended the German-language high school Samuel von Brukenthal National College in Sibiu in the early-1980s before working briefly as an assistant teacher. He left communist Romania with his family and settled in the Bavarian town of Waldkraiburg in 1984; he has said his family and other Romanian Germans left Romania with a heavy heart and only due to state pressure of the then-communist regime. From 1985 until 1988, he studied at the Bavarian University of Applied Sciences for Public Administration and Legal Affairs (de:Hochschule für den öffentlichen Dienst in Bayern; FHVR), and then studied political science at the Bavarian School of Public Policy from 1988 until 1991. From 1991 until 1996, he studied law at LMU Munich, passing his first state examination in 1994 and his second in 1996. Fabritius subsequently started his joint doctorate in law at the University of Tübingen in cooperation with the Romanian-German University of Sibiu (de; ro) in 2001, graduating magna cum laude in 2003.

== Member of the German Bundestag, 2013–2017 ==
Fabritius was elected to the German Bundestag in the 2013 federal elections. He served on the Committee on Foreign Affairs, its Sub-Committee on Foreign Cultural and Educational Policies, and on the Committee on Human Rights and Humanitarian Aid. On the Committee on Human Rights and Humanitarian Aid, he was his parliamentary group's rapporteur on discrimination.

Between 2014 and 2015, Fabritius was also a member of the Committee on Affairs of the European Union, where he served as his parliamentary group's rapporteur on relations with Ukraine and Romania. In 2015, he succeeded Peter Gauweiler as Chairman of the Sub-Committee on Foreign Cultural and Educational Policies. In addition to his committee assignments, he served as deputy chairman of the German-Romanian Parliamentary Friendship Group and as member of the German-Canadian Parliamentary Friendship Group and of the German-US Parliamentary Friendship Group.

From 2014 to mid-2015, Fabritius briefly served as a full member of the German delegation to the Parliamentary Assembly of the Council of Europe, where he sat on the Committee on Legal Affairs and Human Rights and on the Sub-Committee on the Rights of Minorities. Between 2015 and 2016, he served as the Assemby’s rapporteur on the rule of law in South-East European countries. From 2016, he was the rapporteur on the reform of Interpol and the rule of law in south-east European countries.

In November 2014, Fabritius was elected President of the Federation of Expellees (BdV), succeeding Erika Steinbach. He has described his goal as the organisation's leader as representing the interests of all people with roots in Eastern Europe and South Eastern Europe and as building bridges with those countries. While the Federation of Expellees has traditionally focused on the expellees of the 1940s, Fabritius has said he will also place emphasis on recent emigrants from Eastern Europe such as the Romanian Germans.

Under the umbrella of the German parliaments’ godparenthood program for human rights activists, Fabritius has been raising awareness for the work of persecuted Ukrainian filmmaker and writer Oleg Sentsov since 2015.

== Other activities ==
=== Corporate boards ===
- Autohaus Michael Schmidt GmbH, Member of the Advisory Board
- Honterus-Verlag, Member of the Supervisory Board

=== Non-profits ===
- Bavaria-Romania for Social Assistance in Romania, Co-Founder
- Carl Wolff Gesellschaft, Member of the Board of Trustees
- Foundation Flight, Expulsion, Reconciliation, Member of the Board of Trustees
- German Institute for Human Rights (DIMR), Member of the Board of Trustees
- Goethe-Institut, Member of the General Meeting
- Magnus Hirschfeld Foundation, Member of the Board of Trustees
- ZDF, Member of the Television Board (representing the Federation of Expellees)

== Political positions ==
In June 2017, Fabritius was one of only seven CSU members who voted in favor of Germany’s introduction of same-sex marriage.

== Personal life ==
Fabritius lives in a civil union with his partner; it became publicly known that he is gay in 2014.
