= Richard Stücklen =

German politician (1916–2002)

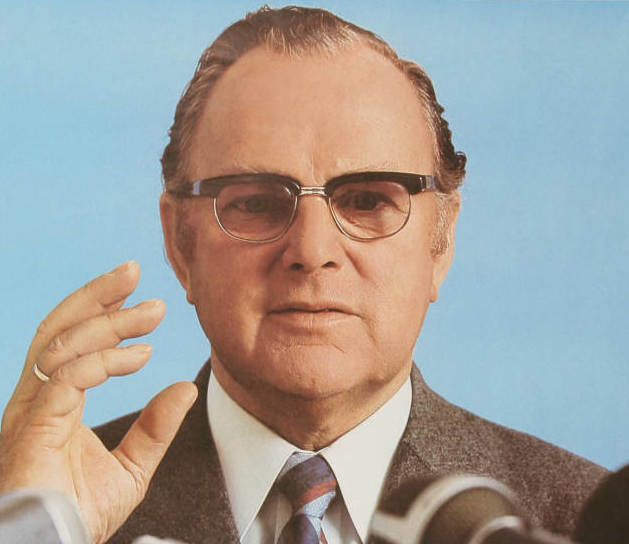
- Stücklen in 1972

President of the Bundestag
- In office 31 May 1979 – 29 March 1983
- Preceded by: Karl Carstens
- Succeeded by: Rainer Barzel

Vice President of the Bundestag (on proposal of the CDU/CSU group)
- In office 29 March 1983 – 20 December 1990
- President: Rainer Barzel; Philipp Jenninger; Rita Süssmuth
- Preceded by: Heinrich Windelen
- Succeeded by: Hans Klein
- In office 14 December 1976 – 31 May 1979
- President: Karl Carstens
- Preceded by: Kai-Uwe von Hassel; Richard Jaeger
- Succeeded by: Richard von Weizsäcker

Minister of Post and Telecommunications
- In office 29 October 1957 – 30 November 1966
- Chancellor: Konrad Adenauer; Ludwig Erhard
- Preceded by: Ernst Lemmer
- Succeeded by: Werner Dollinger

Member of the Bundestag
- In office 7 September 1949 – 20 December 1990
- Preceded by: Constituency established
- Succeeded by: Hansgeorg Hauser
- Constituency: Weißenburg (1949–1976); Roth (1976–1990)

Personal details
- Born: 20 August 1916 Heideck, Germany
- Died: 2 May 2002 (aged 85) Weißenburg in Bayern, Germany
- Party: Christian Social Union
- Children: 2
- Education: Hochschule Mittweida

Richard Stücklen (20 August 1916 – 2 May 2002) was a German politician of the Christian Social Union (CSU). He had previously been a member of the NSDAP (1939–1945). From 1957 to 1966, he served as Federal Minister for Post and Communication. A member of the German parliament for more than 40 years, he served as the seventh president of the Bundestag from 1979 to 1983.

== Early life and career ==
Stücklen was born in Heideck. After an apprenticeship, he worked as an electrician while studying engineering in a correspondence course. He was drafted into the Reichsarbeitsdienst in 1936 and later into the Wehrmacht, where he served as a soldier in World War II from 1940 to 1943, when he was released as unfit for service due to a knee injury. He then worked in the electrical industry and was able to finish his training as an electrical engineer in Mittweida, after which he became a departmental manager at AEG. After 1945, he worked in his parents' locksmithery at Heideck. He co-founded the BMS Ingenieurgesellschaft mbH & Co. KG engineering company in 1952 and was a company associate until 1989.

== Political career ==
Stücklen joined the Nazi Party in 1939. After the end of World War II in 1945, Stücklen was one of the founders of the CSU in Heideck and in Hilpoltstein. He was elected to the Bundestag in 1949 as representative of the electoral district of Weißenburg. He was the youngest member of the first Bundestag and stayed a directly elected member of the Bundestag (first representing Weißenburg, later Roth) for eleven legislative periods until the end of 1990, longer than any other member before or after him.

Stücklen was part of a group of parliamentarians who unsuccessfully proposed changing the German voting system to plurality voting in 1955.

After the 1957 Federal elections, Stücklen became Federal Minister for Post and Communication in Konrad Adenauer's cabinet on 29 October 1957. He was the youngest German Federal minister at that time. He kept his post in the cabinets of Ludwig Erhard. On 1 December 1966, Stücklen left office and was replaced by Werner Dollinger in Kurt Georg Kiesinger's grand coalition cabinet. Between 1967 and 1976, he was chairman of the CSU parliamentary group and deputy chairman of the CDU/CSU group.

After the 1976 Federal elections, where he ran as a potential minister in a possible Helmut Kohl cabinet, he was elected vice president of the Bundestag on 14 December 1976. Shortly after the Bundesversammlung had elected Karl Carstens as President of Germany, Stücklen became his successor as president of the Bundestag. After the 1983 elections, Rainer Barzel became president of the parliament, and Stücklen returned to his vice presidential post which he held until he quit parliament on 20 December 1990.

One of the most famous Bundestag sessions presided over by Stücklen was that of 18 October 1984, when Stücklen excluded Green Party member Jürgen Reents from the session for calling Helmut Kohl "bought by Flick". Christa Nickels then requested an interruption. Stücklen turned her microphone off, which prompted Joschka Fischer to address him, "With respect, Mr. President, you are an asshole", for which he in turn was excluded by Stücklen. Fischer apologized to Stücklen two days later.

== Personal life and death ==
Stücklen was married and had two children. He died in 2002 in Weißenburg in Bayern from a heart disease.

== Works ==
- (in German) Stücklen, Richard: Mit Humor und Augenmaß. ISBN 3-00-008155-0 (autobiography)

== Literature ==
- Michael F. Feldkamp (ed.), Der Bundestagspräsident. Amt – Funktion – Person. 16. Wahlperiode, München 2007, ISBN 978-3-7892-8201-0
