= Tobias Zech =

German politician

Tobias Josef Zech
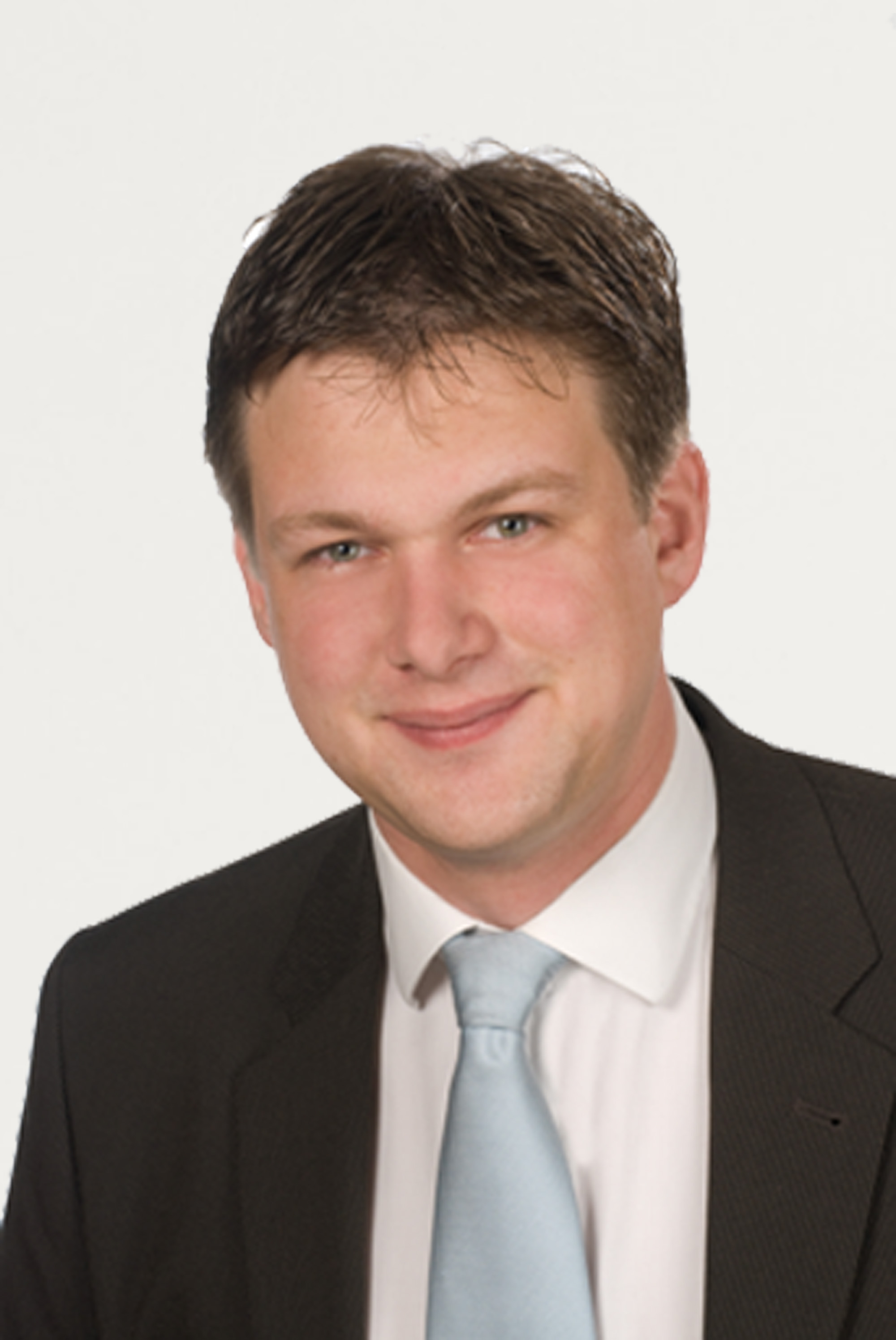
- Zech 2009

Member of the Bundestag; from Bavaria
- In office 25 May 2020 – 19 March 2021
- Preceded by: Astrid Freudenstein
- Succeeded by: Bernd Fabritius
- Constituency: Roth
- In office 22 October 2013 – 24 October 2017
- Constituency: State list

Personal details
- Born: 9 July 1981 (age 45) Trostberg, West Germany
- Party: Christian Social Union
- Children: 2
- Education: Munich University of Applied Sciences

Tobias Josef Zech (born 9 July 1981) is a German politician of the Christian Social Union in Bavaria (CSU) who served as a member of the Bundestag from 2013 until 2017 and from 2020 until 2021.

== Early life and career ==
Zech was born in Trostberg. After receiving vocational training at Edeka, Zech was a contract soldier in a combat company in Brannenburg. Since 2009 he studied business administration at the Munich University of Applied Sciences and joined EADS in Munich in 2010. Then Zech was a project manager of the Commercial Ludwig Bolkow research campus.

== Political career ==
In 2002, Zech was elected to the regional council of Garching an der Alz, where since 2007 worked as a tourism consultant and since 2008 as a fraction chairman of the CSU. In 2009 he was elected as a district chairman of the CSU Garching as well as regional chairman of the Junge Union of Altötting, since 2011 he worked as a regional Chairman of the Junge Union of Upper Bavaria's largest regional association of the Junge Union of Germany.

From 2013 until 2017 Zech served as a Member of the German Bundestag, where he was a full member of the Committee on Employment and Social Affairs and for Economic Cooperation and Development, and a deputy member of the Parliamentary Advisory Council for Sustainable Development. On the Committee on Economic Cooperation and Development, he served as rapporteur on China, Japan, Kazakhstan, Kyrgyzstan, North Korea, South Korea, Tajikistan, Turkmenistan and Uzbekistan.

From 2014, Zech was also a member of the German delegation to the Parliamentary Assembly of the Council of Europe (PACE), where he served on the Committee on Equality and Non-Discrimination; the Committee on Political Affairs and Democracy; the Committee on Rules of Procedure, Immunities and Institutional Affairs; and the Sub-Committee on the Middle East and the Arab World. He served as the Assembly's rapporteur on Lebanon.

Zech returned to the Bundestag in May 2020, when he succeeded Astrid Freudenstein.

In March 2021 Zech became part of a political scandal. On 19 March 2021, he resigned from the Bundestag due to allegations related to Azerbaijan's "Caviar diplomacy" and for receiving a large sum to campaign for former Macedonian PM Nikola Gruevski. He continued business relations with that country through cannabis-related company PharmCann Deutschland AG.

== Other activities ==
- German Military Reserve Association, Vice President (since 2016)
- Katholische Arbeitnehmer-Bewegung (KAB), Member

== Political positions ==
In June 2017, Zech voted against his parliamentary group’s majority and in favor of same-sex marriage.

== Personal life ==
Zech is a Roman Catholic; he is married and has two children.
