= Astrid Freudenstein =

German civil servant and politician

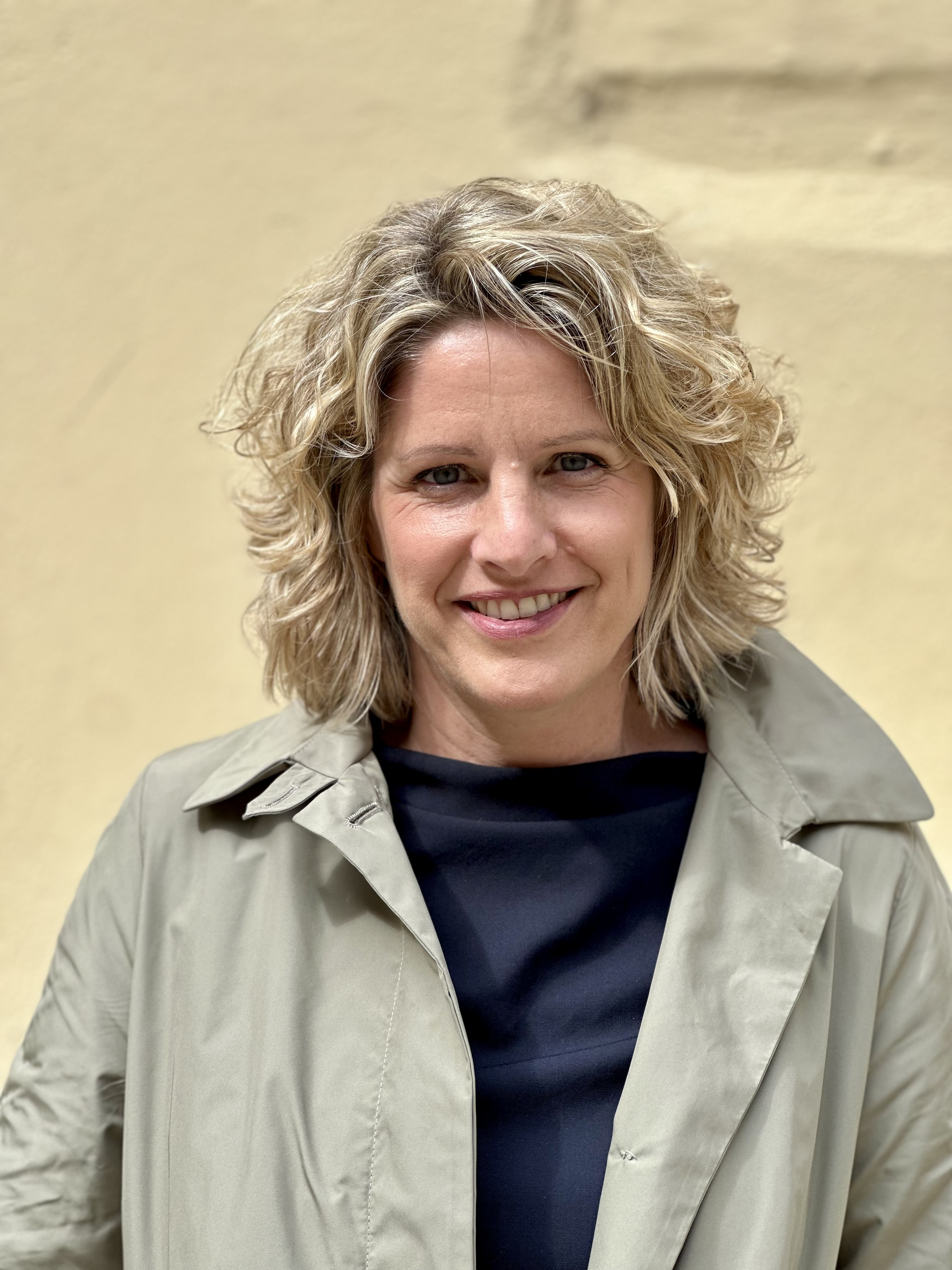
- Freudenstein in 2024

Second (Deputy) Mayor of Regensburg
- Incumbent
- Assumed office 14 May 2020
- First Mayor: Gertrud Maltz-Schwarzfischer

Member of the Bundestag; from Bavaria
- In office 2 July 2019 – 15 May 2020
- Preceded by: Marlene Mortler
- Succeeded by: Tobias Zech
- Constituency: Roth
- In office 22 October 2013 – 24 October 2017
- Constituency: State list

Member of the Regensburg City Council
- Incumbent
- Assumed office 2008

Personal details
- Born: 9 October 1973 (age 52) Bad Griesbach im Rottal, West Germany
- Party: Christian Social Union
- Children: 1
- Education: University of Passau

Astrid Freudenstein (born 9 October 1973) is a German civil servant and politician of the Christian Social Union in Bavaria (CSU).

== Education and early career ==
After graduating from Wilhelm-Diess-Gymnasium Pocking in 1992, Freudenstein initially completed an internship at unserRadio, a local radio station in Passau. In 1993 she began her studies at the University of Passau, which she completed in 1998. In addition to her studies, she completed another internship at Passauer Neue Presse as a scholarship holder of the Dr. Hans-Kapfinger-Stiftung.

After completing her studies, Freudenstein worked as a journalist for Bayerischer Rundfunk and as an author in the Neue Zürcher Zeitung. In 2009, she received the title of Dr. phil. (PhD) with the thesis The Power Physicist against the Media Chancellor, in which she analyzed the gender aspect in the coverage of the 2005 federal election campaign. Since 2010, she has been a research associate and academic lecturer in media studies at the University of Regensburg.

In 2018, Freudenstein became head of the central department of the Federal Ministry of Transport and Digital Infrastructure, led by minister Andreas Scheuer.

== Political career ==
Freudenstein joined the CSU in 2004 and has been a councilor in Regensburg since 2008.

She surprisingly entered the German Bundestag in the 2013 general election. There, she was a full member of the Committee on Employment and Social Affairs and the Committee on Culture and Media, as well as a deputy member of the Committee on Transport and Digital Infrastructure. Since 2014, she also chaired the German-Croatian Parliamentary Friendship Group and was a member of the session board of the German Bundestag.

The focus of Freudenstein's work in the Bundestag was disability policy. As the rapporteur of the CDU/CSU parliamentary group, she contributed to the legislative process of the Federal Law on Participation. In transport policy, she successfully argued for the inclusion of the 6-lane expansion of the A3 motorway between Regensburg and Nittendorf in the Federal Transport Infrastructure Plan.

Freudenstein could not enter the Bundestag again in the 2017 general election because the CSU won all constituencies in Bavaria and thus, no CSU deputy could enter the Bundestag via the state list. However, she replaced Marlene Mortler, who was elected to the European Parliament in the 2019 European election, in the 19th German Bundestag on July 2, 2019. She has since been serving on the Committee on Food and Agriculture.

In the 2020 Bavarian local elections, Freudenstein ran for mayor of the city of Regensburg and was in the lead in the first round of voting on March 15, 2020 with 29.5 percent of the valid votes cast. However, she was defeated in the run-off election on March 29, 2020 by the SPD candidate Gertrud Maltz-Schwarzfischer with 49.3 percent compared to 50.7 percent of the votes.

In the constituent meeting of the Regensburg City Council on May 14, 2020, Freudenstein was elected Second Mayor. As a result, she resigned from her seat in the Bundestag on May 15, 2020.

Freudenstein is a member of the CSU district board of Oberpfalz and a member of the state executive committee of the Women's Union of Bavaria. On October 18, 2019, she was also elected to the CSU Executive Committee as Secretary.

== Political positions ==
Freudenstein is one of the 75 members of the Union – 68 from the CDU (26.9% of all CDU deputies) and 7 from the CSU (12.5% of all CSU deputies) – who voted in favor of allowing same-sex marriage in July 2017.

== Personal life ==
Freudenstein is Roman Catholic, married, and has one child.
