= Röttenbach, Roth =

Röttenbach
- Municipality
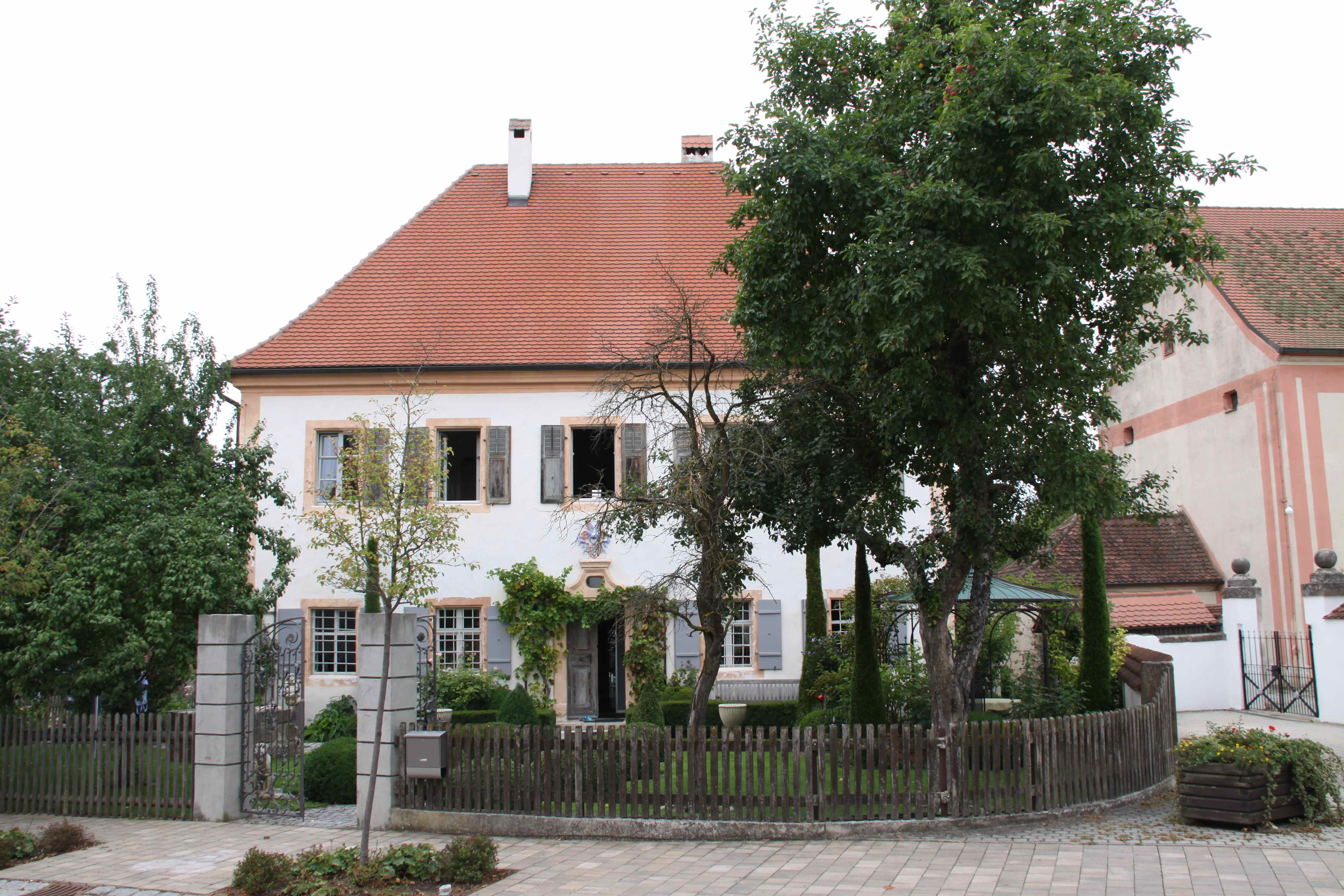
- Rectory

- Coat of arms

- Location of Röttenbach within Roth district
- Interactive map of Röttenbach
- Location within Germany Location within Bavaria
- Coordinates: 49°8′N 11°1′E
- Country: Germany
- State: Bavaria
- Admin. region: Mittelfranken
- District: Roth
- Subdivisions: 5 districts

Government
  - Mayor (2020–26): Thomas Schneider (FW)

Area
  - Total: 21.64 km^{2} (8.36 sq mi)
- Elevation: 372 m (1,220 ft)

Population (2025-12-31)
  - Total: 3,351
  - Density: 154.9/km^{2} (401.1/sq mi)
- Time zone: UTC+01:00 (CET)
  - Summer (DST): UTC+02:00 (CEST)
- Postal codes: 91187
- Dialling codes: 09172
- Vehicle registration: RH
- Website: www.roettenbach.de

Röttenbach (German pronunciation: [ˈʁœtn̩bax]) is a municipality in the district of Roth, in Bavaria, Germany.
