= Abenberg =

- Town
- Coat of arms

- Location of Abenberg within Roth district
- Interactive map of Abenberg
- Location within Germany Location within Bavaria
- Coordinates: 49°15′N 10°58′E
- Country: Germany
- State: Bavaria
- Admin. region: Mittelfranken
- District: Roth
- Subdivisions: 7 districts

Government
  - Mayor (2020–26): Susanne König (SPD)

Area
  - Total: 48.41 km^{2} (18.69 sq mi)
- Elevation: 414 m (1,358 ft)

Population (2025-12-31)
  - Total: 5,455
  - Density: 112.7/km^{2} (291.8/sq mi)
- Time zone: UTC+01:00 (CET)
  - Summer (DST): UTC+02:00 (CEST)
- Postal codes: 91183
- Dialling codes: 09178
- Vehicle registration: RH, HIP
- Website: www.abenberg.de

Abenberg (German: [ˈaːbm̩bɛʁk]) is a town in the Middle Franconian district of Roth, in Bavaria, Germany. It is situated 9 km west of Roth bei Nürnberg and 25 km southwest of Nuremberg.

== Subdivisions ==
Abenberg has 14 Districts:

- Abenberg
- Bechhofen
- Beerbach
- Dürrenmungenau
- Ebersbach
- Fischhaus
- Kapsdorf
- Kleinabenberg
- Louisenau
- Obersteinbach ob Gmünd
- Pflugsmühle
- Pippenhof
- Wassermungenau
- Weihermühle

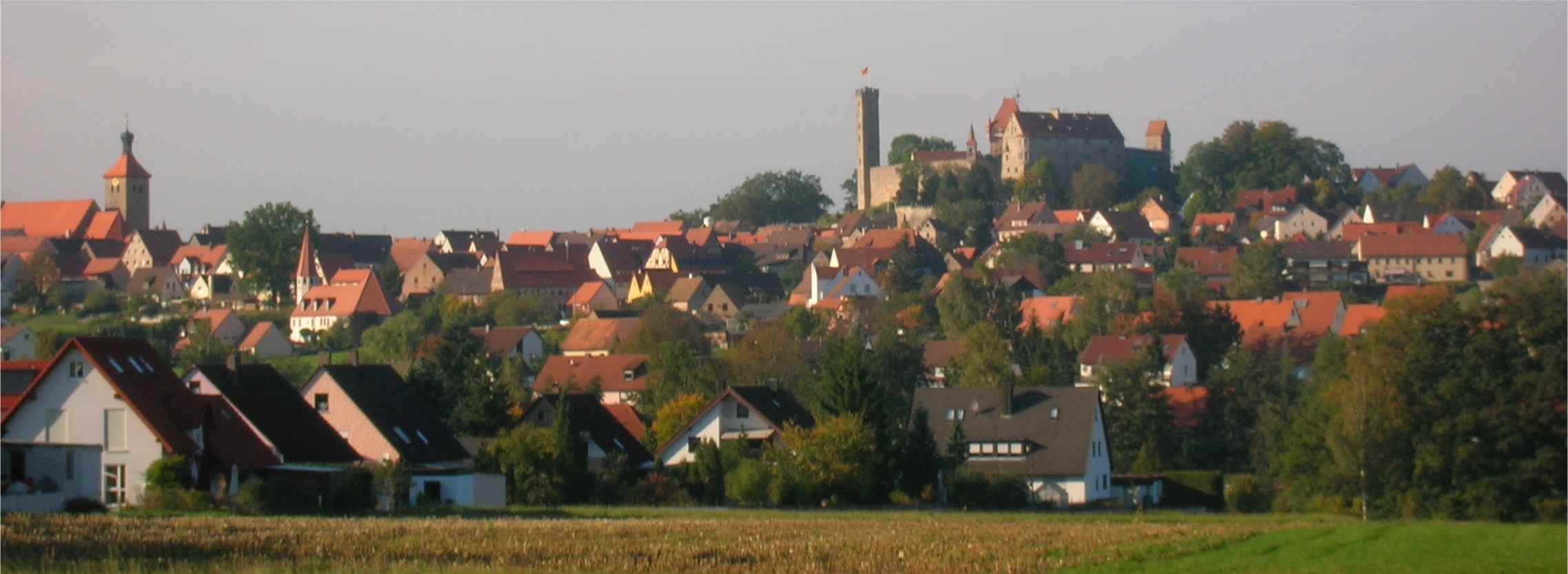
Abenberg

== Place Name ==
The place name was first mentioned between 1057 and 1075 as "Abinberch", and in 1099 as "Auenberg". The first spelling in today's form "Abenberg" occurred in a document from the year 1152. The Old High German base word "Berg" means a larger hill, or later a castle. The determining word is the personal name Abbo. So the place name means "settlement by the mountain or castle of an Abbo".

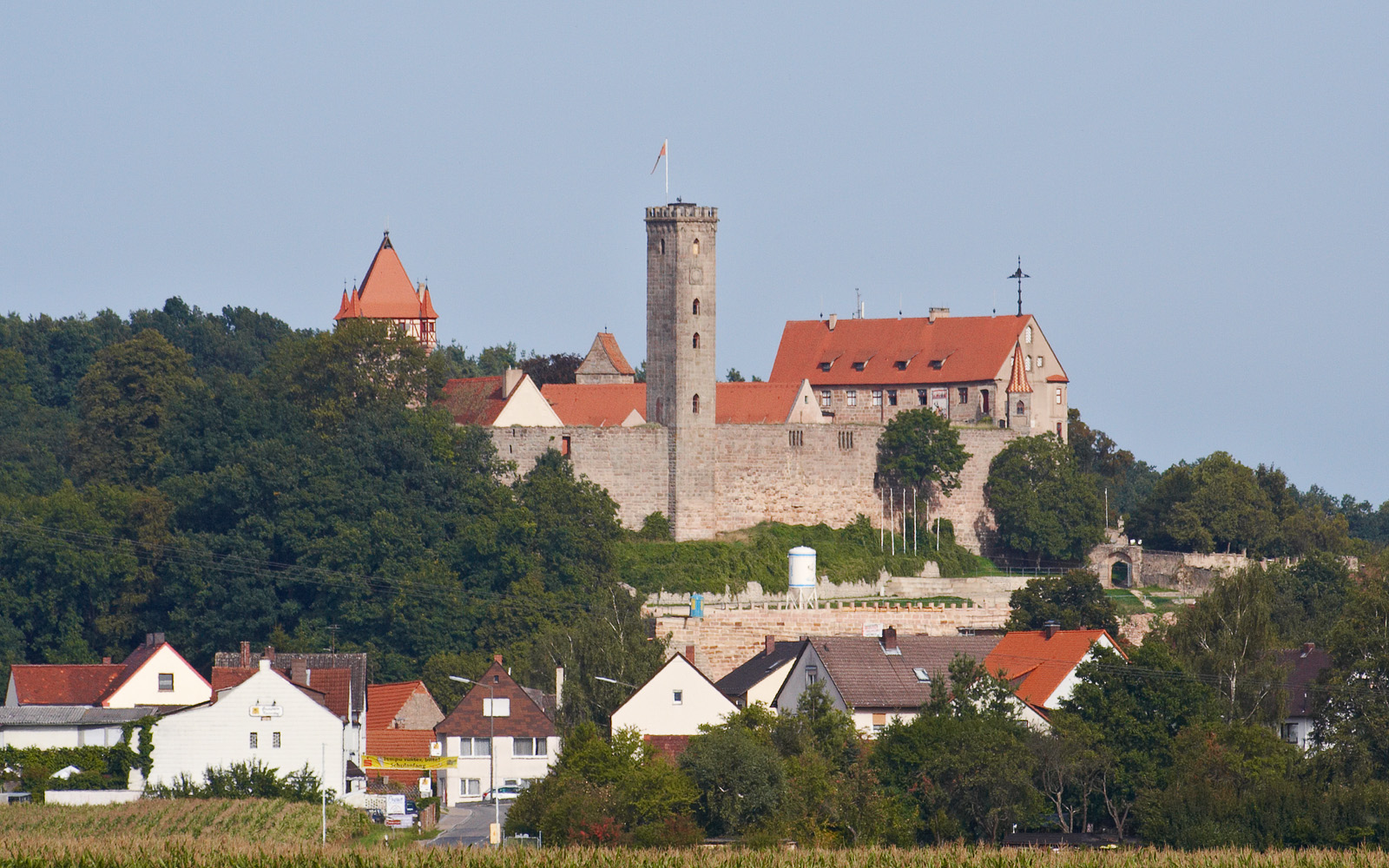
Abenberg Castle

== History ==
The County of Abenberg was established under the Ottonians between 1002 and 1024. The town was founded around 1040 by Wolfram von Abenberg. Within the next 150 years, members of the Abenberger family, including stewards of the Hochstift of Bamberg, the Bishop of Würzburg Reginhard, an abbess in Kitzingen, and other high dignitaries, emerged. Stilla von Abenberg (died around 1140) was beatified in 1927. At the turn of the 13th century, the male line of the Abenbergers died out. Through marriage, Abenberg came to the Burgraves of Nuremberg around 1236 and thus to the Hohenzollerns. At the beginning of the 1200s, the Abenberg Monastery existed relatively briefly. Around 1260, the oppidum of Abenberg was established. In 1296, the Bishop of Eichstätt Reinboto acquired the castle and the town and further expanded Abenberg. In 1299, Abenberg received city rights, and in 1356 it became the Eichstätt district office. The city was the administrative seat of the Prince-Bishopric of Eichstätt and, beginning in 1500 it belonged to the Franconian Circle. During the witch hunts in the Eichstätt witch trials, at least eleven women from Abenberg were executed as alleged witches. Towards the end of the 18th century, there were 169 estates in Abenberg. The high court and city lordship were exercised by the Eichstätt district office of Abenberg. The Abenberg district office was secularized in favor of Bavaria in 1803 and in the same year fell to the Principality of Ansbach, from which it finally passed to the Kingdom of Bavaria in 1806 (Treaty of Paris). The tax district of Abenberg was formed in 1808. In 1811, the municipal municipality of Abenberg was established, which was identical to the tax district. It was assigned to the Pleinfeld district court (renamed Roth district court in 1858, and reassigned to the Schwabach district court in 1970) for administration and jurisdiction, and to the Spalt revenue office (renamed Spalt finance office in 1919) for financial administration. With the Second Municipal Edict in 1818, Abenberg received the status of a second-class city. In 1932, the Spalt finance office was dissolved and Abenberg was assigned to the Schwabach finance office. The municipality originally had a territorial area of 8,420 km^{2}. The Abenberg Castle was bequeathed to the city of Frankfurt by its last owner in 1959, but the city did not accept this gift. From 1982 to 1984, the city of Abenberg acquired the castle and renovated it from the ground up. Today, the House of Franconian History, the Abenberg Lace Museum, and a hotel with a restaurant are located there. The castle is used for exhibitions as well as for public and private events.

== Geography and climate ==
The city is around 25 kilometers southwest of Nuremberg and ten kilometers west of the district town of Roth, on the northern edge of the Franconian Lake District, broadly seen between the Frankenhöhe in the northwest, Nuremberg in the north and the Franconian Jura in the south and east. The small rivers in the city area drain via the Rednitz/Regnitz to the Main. The spalter hill country rises south of Abenberg.

== Sons and daughters of the town ==
- John Schopper, 27th abbot of monastery Heilsbronn (1529–1540)
- Georg Schwarz (1873–1948), politician, (Bavarian People's Party, Center Party), member of Reichstag and Landtag
