= Ralph Edelhäußer =

German politician

Ralph Edelhäußer MdB
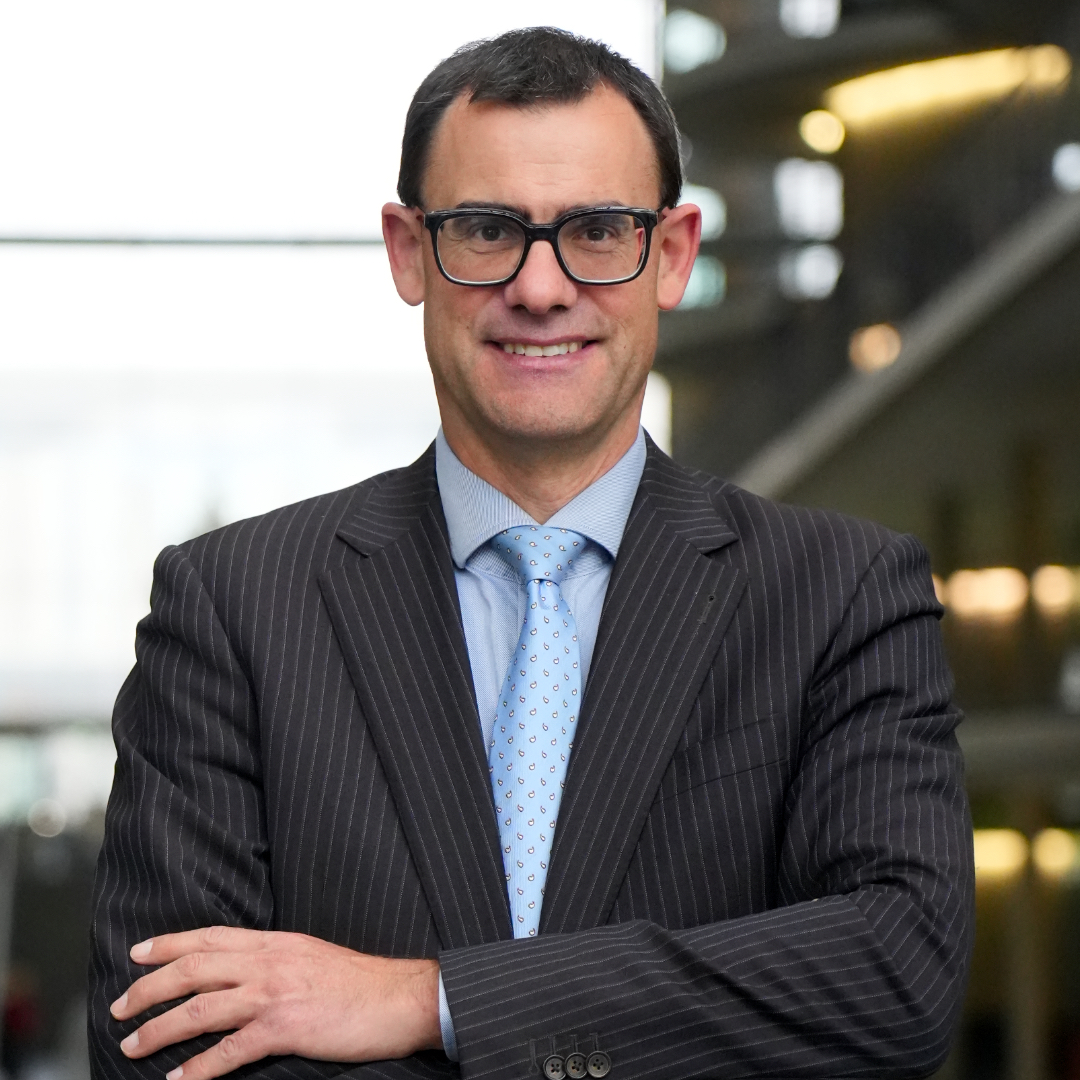
- Edelhäußer in 2023

Member of the Bundestag; for Roth
- Incumbent
- Assumed office 26 October 2021
- Preceded by: Bernd Fabritius

Personal details
- Born: 22 March 1973 (age 53) Roth, Bavaria, West Germany
- Party: Christian Social Union
- Education: Technische Hochschule Nürnberg

Ralph Edelhäußer (born 22 March 1973) is a German politician for the CSU and banker. He has been a member of the German Bundestag since 2021.

== Life ==
Edelhäußer was born in the West German town of Roth. Ralph Edelhäußer attended the Roth-Gartenstraße Elementary School from 1979 to 1983 and then transferred to the Roth Grammar School, where he graduated in 1992. After twelve months of basic military service at the Otto-Lilienthal barracks in Roth, he completed a so-called "combined study program" based on the "Hamburg model" at the former Stadtsparkasse Nürnberg (now: Sparkasse Nürnberg). In August 1998, Edelhäußer graduated in business administration at the Georg Simon Ohm University of Applied Sciences in Nuremberg (predecessor of the Georg Simon Ohm University of Applied Sciences in Nuremberg). This included a degree in banking and business administration from September 1993 to August 1998. From 1997 onwards, he worked as a securities consultant. On 1 July 2000, he moved to Sparkasse Mittelfranken-Süd, working as a corporate customer advisor for the liberal professions until 22 March 2011.

Edelhäußer is married and has one son.

== Politics ==
From May 2002, he was an honorary member of Roth's city council for the CSU and the third mayor from 2008 to 2011. On 23 March 2011, he succeeded Richard Erdmann (SPD) as the first mayor of Roth. He has been an honorary member of the Roth district council since 2008

Edelhäußer was directly elected to the German Bundestag in 2021, running for the first time as a direct candidate for the CSU in the Bundestag constituency of Roth 246, which includes the districts of Nürnberger Land and Roth and was elected to the 20th German Bundestag with 38.0% of the first votes of all 13 direct candidates. In the Bundestag, he is a full member of the Committee on Family Affairs, Senior Citizens, Women and Youth and the Petitions Committee. He is a deputy member of the Committee on Internal Affairs and Homeland Affairs. He is also chairman of the CDU/CSU parliamentary group in the Subcommittee on Civic Engagement and secretary.
