= Heideck =

- Town
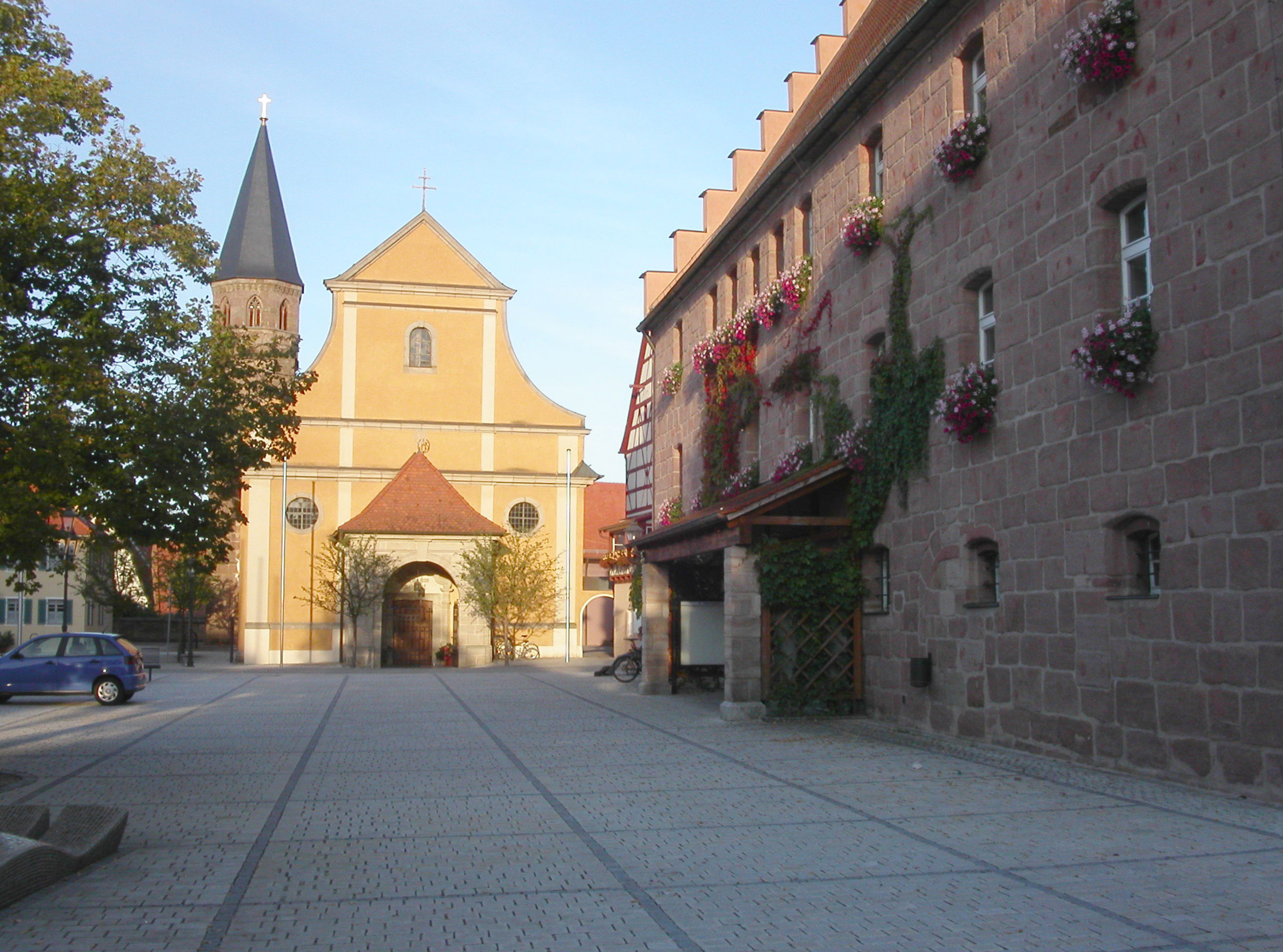
- Town square with the Church of Saint John the Baptist and the town hall (right)

- Coat of arms

- Location of Heideck within Roth district
- Interactive map of Heideck
- Location within Germany Location within Bavaria
- Coordinates: 49°7′N 11°7′E
- Country: Germany
- State: Bavaria
- Admin. region: Mittelfranken
- District: Roth
- Subdivisions: 16 districts

Government
  - Mayor (2020–26): Ralf Beyer (FW)

Area
  - Total: 58.64 km^{2} (22.64 sq mi)
- Elevation: 407 m (1,335 ft)

Population (2025-12-31)
  - Total: 4,662
  - Density: 79.50/km^{2} (205.9/sq mi)
- Time zone: UTC+01:00 (CET)
  - Summer (DST): UTC+02:00 (CEST)
- Postal codes: 91180
- Dialling codes: 09177
- Vehicle registration: RH
- Website: www.heideck.de

Heideck (German pronunciation: [ˈhaɪdɛk]) is a town with full legal town charter in the district of Roth, in Bavaria, Germany. It is situated in the Metropolitan Area of Nuremberg and at the same time in the Franconian Lake District.

== History ==
Heideck was first mentioned in 1288.

== Mayors ==
- 1945-1948: Georg Stücklen (CSU)
- 1948-1972: Johann "Hans" Stücklen (CSU)
- 1972-1990: Benno Eckert (CSU)
- 1990-2002: Hans Herger (Free voters Bavaria)
- 2002-2014: Ottmar Brunner (CSU)
- From 2014 onwards: Ralf Beyer (Free voters Heideck)

== Notable people ==
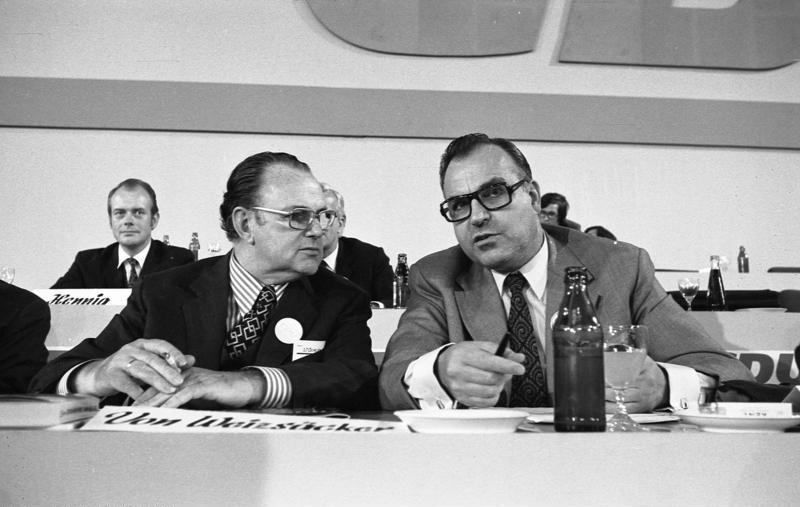
Wiesbaden, CDU party convent 1972, later chancellor Helmut Kohl, Richard Stücklen (left)

- Richard Stücklen (20 August 1916 - 2 May 2002): German politician (CSU), President of the Bundestag, Federal Minister for Post and Communication
