= Roth (electoral district) =

Federal electoral district of Germany

245 Roth
- Electoral district for the Bundestag
- Roth in 2025
- State: Bavaria
- Population: 297,500 (2019)
- Electorate: 227,701 (2025)
- Major settlements: Lauf an der Pegnitz; Roth; Altdorf bei Nürnberg
- Area: 1,694.7 km^{2}

Current electoral district
- Created: 1976
- Party: CSU
- Member: Ralph Edelhäußer
- Elected: 2021, 2025

Roth is an electoral constituency (German: Wahlkreis) represented in the Bundestag. It elects one member via first-past-the-post voting. Under the current constituency numbering system, it is designated as constituency 245. It is located in northern Bavaria, comprising the districts of Nürnberger Land and Roth.

Roth was created for the 1976 federal election. Since 2021, it has been represented by Ralph Edelhäußer of the Christian Social Union (CSU).

== Geography ==
Roth is located in northern Bavaria. As of the 2021 federal election, it comprises the districts of Nürnberger Land and Roth.

== History ==
Roth was created in 1976. In the 1976 through 1998 elections, it was constituency 232 in the numbering system. In the 2002 and 2005 elections, it was number 247. In the 2009 through 2021 elections, it was number 246. From the 2025 election, it has been number 245.

Originally, the constituency comprised the independent city of Schwabach and the districts of Roth and Weißenburg-Gunzenhausen. It acquired its current borders in the 1990 election.

Election	No.	Name	Borders
1976	232	Roth	Schwabach city; Roth district; Weißenburg-Gunzenhausen district
1980	232	Roth	Schwabach city; Roth district; Weißenburg-Gunzenhausen district
1983	232	Roth	Schwabach city; Roth district; Weißenburg-Gunzenhausen district
1987	232	Roth	Schwabach city; Roth district; Weißenburg-Gunzenhausen district
1990	232	Roth	Nürnberger Land district; Roth district
1994	232	Roth	Nürnberger Land district; Roth district
1998	232	Roth	Nürnberger Land district; Roth district
2002	247	Roth	Nürnberger Land district; Roth district
2005	247	Roth	Nürnberger Land district; Roth district
2009	246	Roth	Nürnberger Land district; Roth district
2013	246	Roth	Nürnberger Land district; Roth district
2017	246	Roth	Nürnberger Land district; Roth district
2021	246	Roth	Nürnberger Land district; Roth district
2025	245	Roth	Nürnberger Land district; Roth district

== Members ==
The constituency has been held continuously by the Christian Social Union (CSU) since its creation. It was first represented by Richard Stücklen from 1976 to 1990, followed by Hansgeorg Hauser from 1990 to 2002. Marlene Mortler served as representative from 2002 to 2019, when she resigned to sit in the European Parliament. She was succeeded by Ralph Edelhäußer in 2021, who was re-elected in 2025.

Election	Member	Party	%
1976	Richard Stücklen	CSU	60.7
1980	Richard Stücklen	CSU	60.4
1983	Richard Stücklen	CSU	64.7
1987	Richard Stücklen	CSU	59.2
1990	Hansgeorg Hauser	CSU	49.6
1994	Hansgeorg Hauser	CSU	50.7
1998	Hansgeorg Hauser	CSU	47.6
2002	Marlene Mortler	CSU	55.2
2005	Marlene Mortler	CSU	51.0
2009	Marlene Mortler	CSU	44.6
2013	Marlene Mortler	CSU	50.6
2017	Marlene Mortler	CSU	44.5
2021	Ralph Edelhäußer	CSU	38.0
2025	Ralph Edelhäußer	CSU	42.9

== Election results ==
=== 2025 election ===
Federal election (2025): Roth
Notes:	Blue background denotes the winner of the electorate vote. Pink background denotes a candidate elected from their party list. Yellow background denotes an electorate win by a list member, or other incumbent. A ✓ or ✗ denotes status of any incumbent, win or lose respectively.						
Party	Candidate	Votes	%	±%	Party votes	%	±%
CSU	✓ Ralph Edelhäußer	84,143	42.9	▲4.9	74,208	37.8	▲5.4
AfD	Klaus Peter Norgall	33,197	16.9	▲9.0	35,443	18.0	▲9.5
SPD	Jan Heinz Stefan Plobner	25,556	13.0	▼3.9	26,319	13.4	▼7.2
Greens	Dr. Bianca Pircher	24,180	12.3	▼1.0	23,879	12.1	▼1.7
Left	Evelyn Schötz	9,949	5.1	▲2.4	10,626	5.4	▲2.8
FW	Jürgen Joos	8,870	4.5	▼4.3	7,155	3.6	▼3.0
FDP	Kristine Lütke	5,524	2.8	▼3.9	7,482	3.8	▼5.2
BSW					5,859	3.0	
APT					1,818		
Volt	Gabriel Adrian Bremer	1,884	1.0		1,082	0.6	▲0.4
PARTEI					753	0.4	▼0.3
ÖDP	Walter Stadelmann	1,397	0.7	▼0.1	657	0.3	▼0.1
dieBasis					656	0.3	▼1.6
Voice for Referendums	Daniela Maria Barbara Zibi	829	0.4				
BD	Birgit Ruder	655	0.3		283	0.1	
BP					187	0.1	▼0.1
Humanists					110	0.1	Steady
MLPD					27	0.0	Steady
Informal votes		990			630		
Total valid votes		196,184			196,544		
Turnout		197,174	86.6	▲3.9			
CSU hold	Majority	50,946	26.0	▲4.9			

=== 2021 election ===
Federal election (2021): Roth
Notes:	Blue background denotes the winner of the electorate vote. Pink background denotes a candidate elected from their party list. Yellow background denotes an electorate win by a list member, or other incumbent. A ✓ or ✗ denotes status of any incumbent, win or lose respectively.						
Party	Candidate	Votes	%	±%	Party votes	%	±%
CSU	Ralph Edelhäußer	71,478	38.0	▼6.5	60,980	32.3	▼5.5
SPD	Jan Plobner	31,806	16.9	▼3.7	38,786	20.6	▲2.1
Greens	Felix Erbe	25,140	13.4	▲5.5	26,197	13.9	▲4.1
FW	Felix Locke	16,528	8.8	▲3.8	12,601	6.7	▲3.4
AfD	Klaus Norgall	14,944	7.9	▼2.3	16,043	8.5	▼3.1
FDP	Kristine Lütke	12,596	6.7	▲2.0	16,974	9.0	▲0.3
Left	Evelyn Schötz	5,076	2.7	▼2.1	4,950	2.6	▼3.7
dieBasis	Stefan Kuschel	4,720	2.5		3,696	2.0	
Tierschutzpartei					2,401	1.3	▲0.2
PARTEI	Max Weggenmann	2,149	1.1		1,322	0.7	0.0
Pirates	Julian Häffner	1,696	0.9	▼0.2	1,056	0.6	▲0.1
ÖDP	Pascal Henninger	1,534	0.8	▼0.4	866	0.5	▼0.2
Team Todenhöfer					541	0.3	
Independent	Udo Schlot	431	0.2				
BP					376	0.2	▼0.1
Volt					376	0.2	
Unabhängige					356	0.2	
Gesundheitsforschung					264	0.1	0.0
Bündnis C					191	0.1	
V-Partei3					176	0.1	▼0.1
NPD					151	0.1	▼0.2
Humanists					131	0.1	
The III. Path					103	0.1	
du.					90	0.0	
LKR	Marcus Nehring	185	0.1		63	0.0	
MLPD					19	0.0	0.0
DKP					21	0.0	0.0
Informal votes		1,392			945		
Total valid votes		188,283			188,730		
Turnout		189,675	82.7	▲1.0			
CSU hold	Majority	39,672	21.1	▼2.8			

=== 2017 election ===
Federal election (2017): Roth
Notes:	Blue background denotes the winner of the electorate vote. Pink background denotes a candidate elected from their party list. Yellow background denotes an electorate win by a list member, or other incumbent. A ✓ or ✗ denotes status of any incumbent, win or lose respectively.						
Party	Candidate	Votes	%	±%	Party votes	%	±%
CSU	✓ Marlene Mortler	81,874	44.5	▼6.2	69,743	37.8	▼7.7
SPD	Alexander Horlamus	37,920	20.6	▼7.0	34,040	18.4	▼6.1
AfD	Siegfried Lang	18,925	10.3		21,317	11.6	▲7.6
Greens	Gabriele Drechsler	14,465	7.9	▲1.2	18,033	9.8	▲1.3
FW	Wolfgang Hauber	9,191	5.0	▲0.8	6,080	3.3	▼0.4
Left	Helmut Johach	8,887	4.8	▲1.2	11,635	6.3	▲2.5
FDP	Andreas Helmut Neuner	8,583	4.7	▲1.4	15,990	8.7	▲4.2
Tierschutzpartei					1,914	1.0	▲0.3
PARTEI					1,257	0.7	
ÖDP	Walter Stadelmann	2,271	1.2		1,206	0.7	0.0
Pirates	Jonas Schwemmer	2,070	1.1	▼1.4	851	0.5	▼1.5
NPD					557	0.3	▼0.6
BP					488	0.3	▼0.1
DM					343	0.2	
V-Partei³					280	0.2	
Gesundheitsforschung					256	0.1	
DiB					249	0.1	
BGE					227	0.1	
MLPD					36	0.0	0.0
DKP					30	0.0	
BüSo					22	0.0	0.0
Informal votes		1,709			1,341		
Total valid votes		184,186			184,554		
Turnout		185,895	81.7	▲7.0			
CSU hold	Majority	43,954	23.9	▲0.9			

=== 2013 election ===
Federal election (2013): Roth
Notes:	Blue background denotes the winner of the electorate vote. Pink background denotes a candidate elected from their party list. Yellow background denotes an electorate win by a list member, or other incumbent. A ✓ or ✗ denotes status of any incumbent, win or lose respectively.						
Party	Candidate	Votes	%	±%	Party votes	%	±%
CSU	✓ Marlene Mortler	84,618	50.6	▲6.0	76,181	45.5	▲7.3
SPD	Christian Nürnberger	46,200	27.6	▲3.7	41,107	24.5	▲3.1
Greens	Tom Aurnhammer	11,142	6.7	▼3.1	14,247	8.5	▼3.0
FW	Hartwig Kohl	7,069	4.2		6,192	3.7	
Left	Helmut Johach	6,064	3.6	▼2.1	6,394	3.8	▼2.8
FDP	Marina Schuster	5,371	3.2	▼7.9	7,467	4.5	▼9.2
AfD					6,533	3.9	
Pirates	Michael Ceglar	4,137	2.5	▲0.6	3,252	1.9	▼0.2
NPD	Torsten Steinbeck	2,598	1.6	▼0.4	1,471	0.9	▼0.6
Tierschutzpartei					1,235	0.7	▲0.1
ÖDP					1,095	0.7	0.0
REP					803	0.5	▼0.4
BP					560	0.3	0.0
DIE FRAUEN					293	0.2	
Party of Reason					192	0.1	
DIE VIOLETTEN					180	0.1	▼0.1
PRO					141	0.1	
RRP					68	0.0	▼1.0
MLPD					24	0.0	0.0
BüSo					18	0.0	0.0
Informal votes		1,566			1,312		
Total valid votes		167,199			167,453		
Turnout		168,765	74.6	▼1.4			
CSU hold	Majority	38,418	23.0	▲2.4			

=== 2009 election ===
Federal election (2009): Roth
Notes:	Blue background denotes the winner of the electorate vote. Pink background denotes a candidate elected from their party list. Yellow background denotes an electorate win by a list member, or other incumbent. A ✓ or ✗ denotes status of any incumbent, win or lose respectively.						
Party	Candidate	Votes	%	±%	Party votes	%	±%
CSU	✓ Marlene Mortler	75,280	44.6	▼6.4	64,763	38.2	▼7.0
SPD	Hannedore Nowotny	40,464	24.0	▼9.6	36,327	21.4	▼10.6
FDP	Marina Schuster	18,809	11.1	▲6.7	23,177	13.7	▲5.8
Greens	Jutta Berlinghof	16,521	9.8	▲4.5	19,517	11.5	▲4.1
Left	Richard Schlappa	9,610	5.7	▲2.6	11,262	6.6	▲3.1
NPD	Sigurd Engelmann	3,289	1.9	▲0.2	2,487	1.5	▲0.1
Pirates	Christian Kubisch	3,205	1.9		3,690	2.2	
RRP	Karin Arnold	1,642	1.0		1,822	1.1	
REP					1,474	0.9	▲0.2
Tierschutzpartei					1,162	0.7	
FAMILIE					1,139	0.7	▲0.2
ÖDP					1,065	0.6	
BP					495	0.3	▲0.1
DIE VIOLETTEN					361	0.2	
PBC					359	0.2	▼0.3
CM					120	0.1	
DVU					94	0.1	
BüSo					42	0.0	0.0
MLPD					28	0.0	0.0
Informal votes		2,256			1,692		
Total valid votes		168,820			169,384		
Turnout		171,076	76.1	▼6.0			
CSU hold	Majority	34,816	20.6	▲3.2			

=== 2005 election ===
Federal election (2005):Roth
Notes:	Blue background denotes the winner of the electorate vote. Pink background denotes a candidate elected from their party list. Yellow background denotes an electorate win by a list member, or other incumbent. A ✓ or ✗ denotes status of any incumbent, win or lose respectively.						
Party	Candidate	Votes	%	±%	Party votes	%	±%
CSU	✓ Marlene Mortler	91,633	51.0	▼4.2	81,783	45.3	▼7.3
SPD	Hannedore Nowotny	60,277	33.6	▼1.6	57,883	32.0	▼0.3
Greens	Paul Brunner	9,557	5.3	▲0.3	13,359	7.4	▼0.1
FDP	Marina Schuster	7,968	4.4	▲0.6	14,254	7.9	▲3.3
Left	Elisabeth Altmann	5,511	3.1		6,333	3.5	▲2.9
NPD	Michael Paulus	3,227	1.8		2,528	1.4	▲1.1
PBC	Hans Mehl	1,437	0.8	0.0	871	0.5	▲0.2
REP					1,213	0.7	▲0.1
Familie					935	0.5	
GRAUEN					488	0.3	▲0.2
Feminist					444	0.2	▲0.1
BP					375	0.2	▲0.1
MLPD					76	0.0	
BüSo					72	0.0	0.0
Informal votes		3,627			2,623		
Total valid votes		179,610			180,614		
Turnout		183,237	82.1	▼2.6			
CSU hold	Majority	31,356	17.4				
