= Schwanstetten =

- Municipality
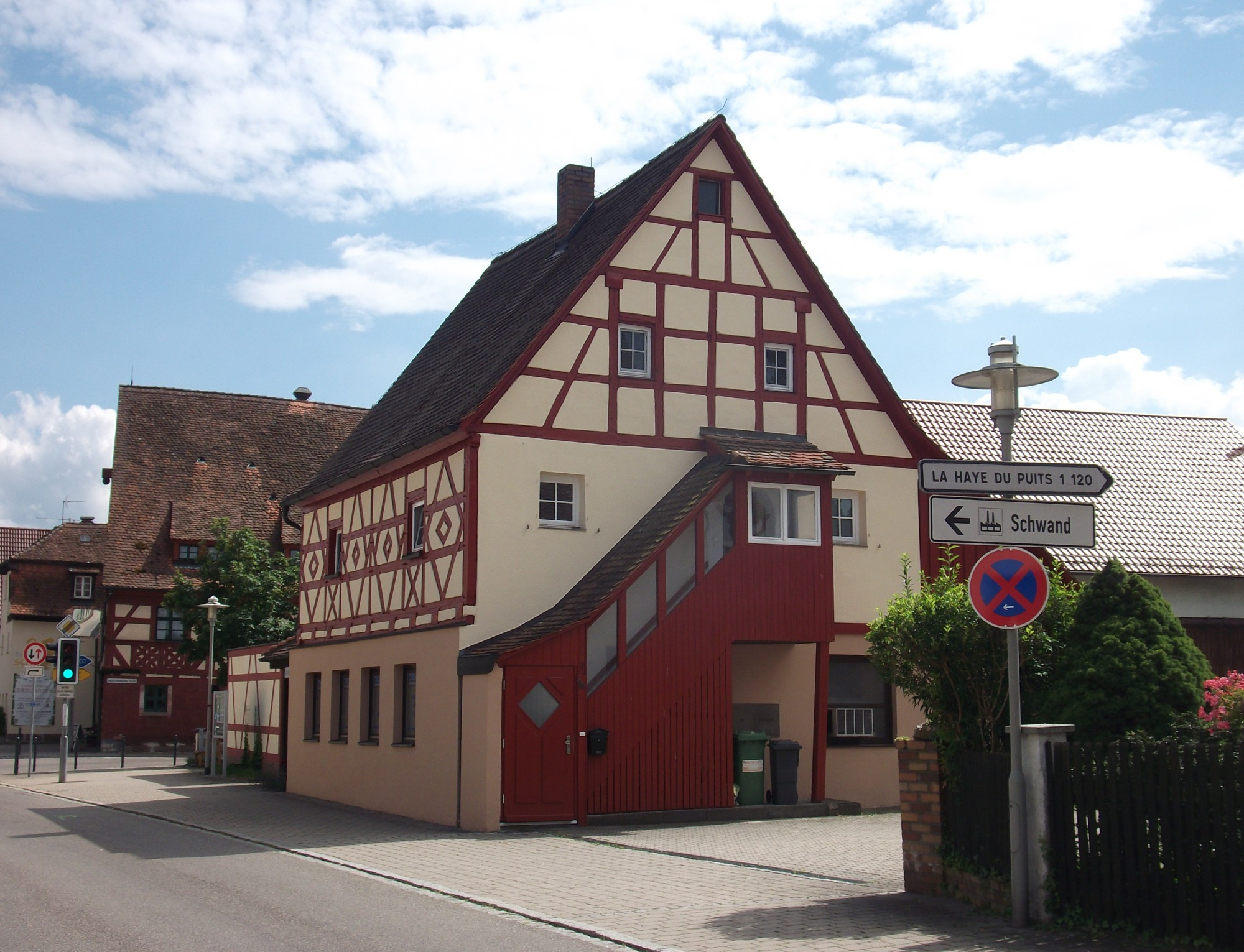
- Historical building in Schwand bei Nürnberg

- Coat of arms

- Location of Schwanstetten within Roth district
- Interactive map of Schwanstetten
- Location within Germany Location within Bavaria
- Coordinates: 49°18′40″N 11°7′40″E
- Country: Germany
- State: Bavaria
- Admin. region: Mittelfranken
- District: Roth
- Subdivisions: 6 districts

Government
  - Mayor (2020–26): Robert Pfann (SPD)

Area
  - Total: 32.35 km^{2} (12.49 sq mi)
- Elevation: 350 m (1,150 ft)

Population (2025-12-31)
  - Total: 7,146
  - Density: 220.9/km^{2} (572.1/sq mi)
- Time zone: UTC+01:00 (CET)
  - Summer (DST): UTC+02:00 (CEST)
- Postal codes: 90596
- Dialling codes: 09170
- Vehicle registration: RH
- Website: www.schwanstetten.de

Schwanstetten (German pronunciation: [ʃvaːnˈʃtɛtn̩]) is a municipality in the district of Roth, in Bavaria, Germany. Schwanstetten is located 15 km south of Nuremberg.

== Geography ==
=== Division of the municipality ===
After the local government reforms of 1978 Schwanstetten consists of 6 districts:

- Leerstetten
- Schwand
- Furth
- Mittelhembach
- Harm
- Hagershof

== History ==
The town district Schwand was first mentioned in 1186, another one, Leerstetten, in 1194.

=== Mayors ===
- since 2008: Robert Pfann (SPD)
- 1996–2008:Dietmar Koltzenburg
- 1990–1996: Alfred Herzig
- 1984–1990: Leonhard Kohl
- 1978–1984: Fritz Meyer

=== Twin towns ===
- La Haye-du-Puits (Normandy, France) – since 1988
