= Büchenbach =

- Municipality
- Coat of arms

- Location of Büchenbach within Roth district
- Interactive map of Büchenbach
- Location within Germany Location within Bavaria
- Coordinates: 49°16′N 11°4′E
- Country: Germany
- State: Bavaria
- Admin. region: Mittelfranken
- District: Roth
- Subdivisions: 13 districts

Government
  - Mayor (2020–26): Helmut Bauz

Area
  - Total: 30.76 km^{2} (11.88 sq mi)
- Elevation: 366 m (1,201 ft)

Population (2025-12-31)
  - Total: 5,419
  - Density: 176.2/km^{2} (456.3/sq mi)
- Time zone: UTC+01:00 (CET)
  - Summer (DST): UTC+02:00 (CEST)
- Postal codes: 91186
- Dialling codes: 09171
- Vehicle registration: RH
- Website: www.buechenbach.de

Büchenbach (German pronunciation: [ˈbyːçn̩bax]) is a municipality in the district of Roth, in Bavaria, Germany.

== History ==
During the Thirty Years' War the population decreased very sharp. Later protestant refugees came from Austria. In 1886 the train station was opened. In 1913 electricity was installed. In 1939 Büchenbach had 705 inhabitants. After 1945 refugees came to Büchenbach, so in 1962 there were 2200 inhabitants.
