= Rohr, Middle Franconia =

Rohr
- Municipality
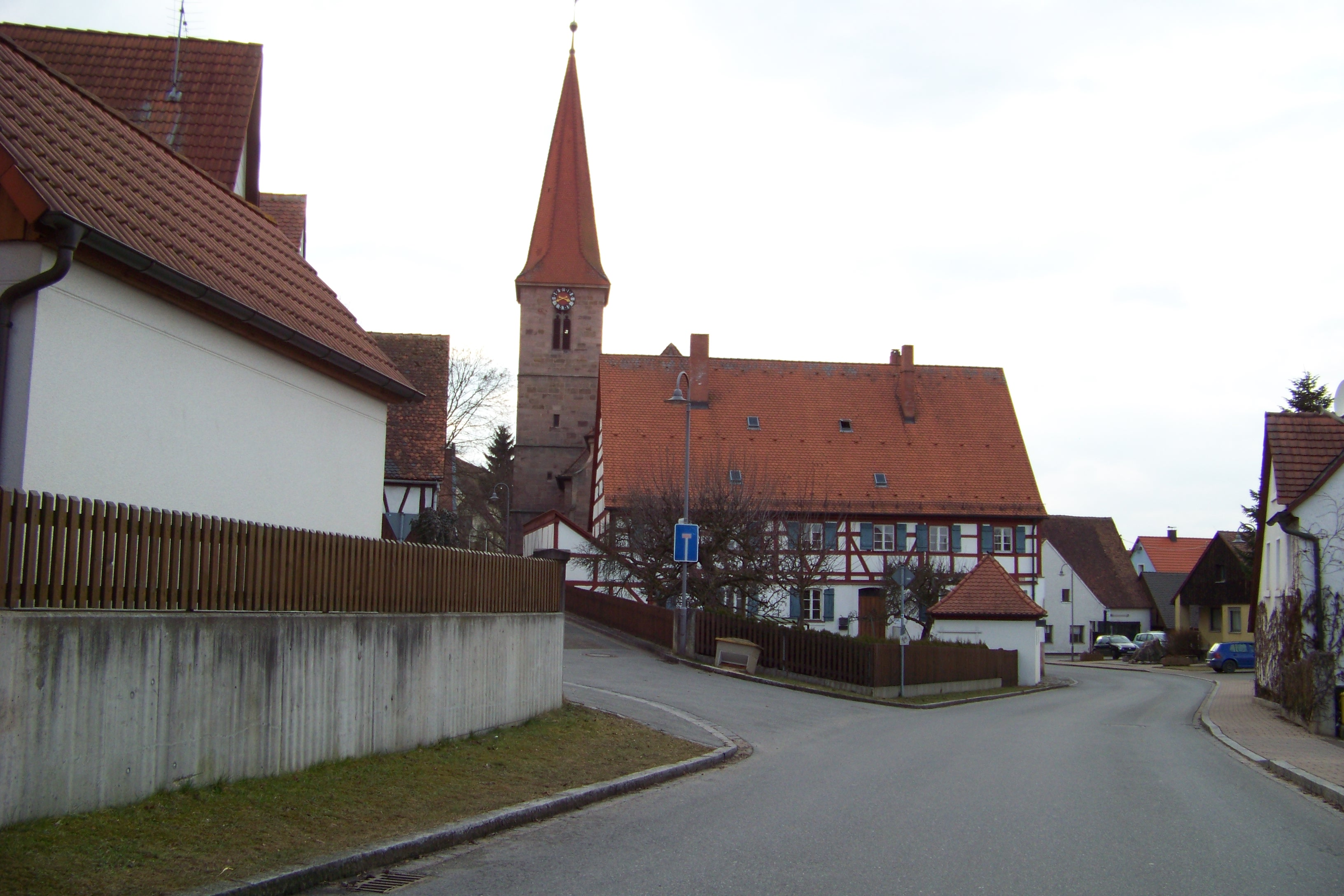
- Church of Saint Emmeram and the rectory

- Coat of arms

- Location of Rohr within Roth district
- Interactive map of Rohr
- Location within Germany Location within Bavaria
- Coordinates: 49°20′N 10°53′E
- Country: Germany
- State: Bavaria
- Admin. region: Mittelfranken
- District: Roth
- Subdivisions: 17 districts

Government
  - Mayor (2020–26): Felix Fröhlich (SPD)

Area
  - Total: 46.53 km^{2} (17.97 sq mi)
- Elevation: 350 m (1,150 ft)

Population (2025-12-31)
  - Total: 3,724
  - Density: 80.03/km^{2} (207.3/sq mi)
- Time zone: UTC+01:00 (CET)
  - Summer (DST): UTC+02:00 (CEST)
- Postal codes: 91189
- Dialling codes: 09876
- Vehicle registration: RH
- Website: www.rohr-mfr.de

Rohr (German pronunciation: [ʁoːɐ̯]) is a municipality in the district of Roth, in Bavaria, Germany.
