= Lauf an der Pegnitz =

- Town
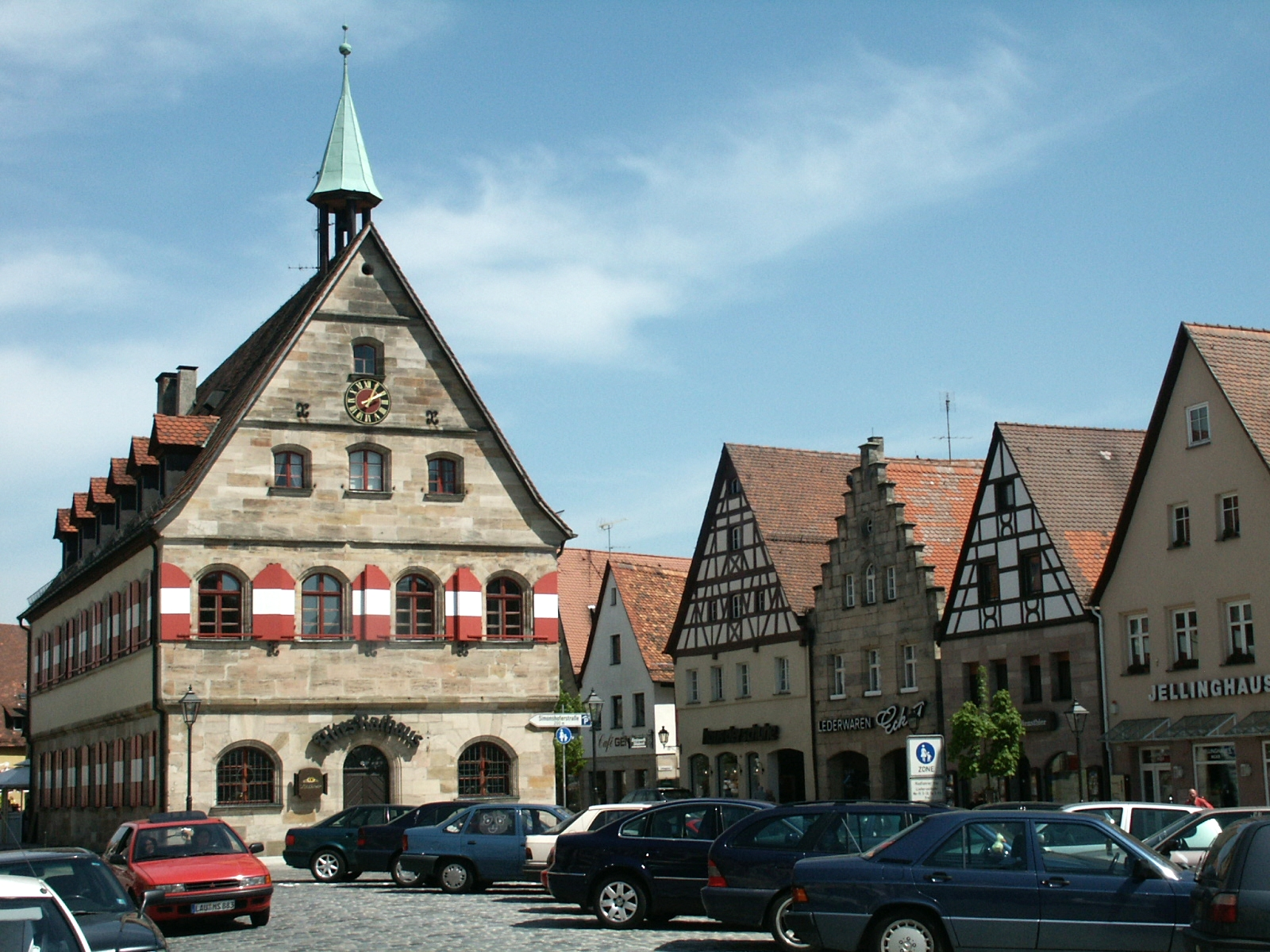
- Old town hall and the market square

- Coat of arms

- Location of Lauf an der Pegnitz within Nürnberger Land district
- Interactive map of Lauf an der Pegnitz
- Location within Germany Location within Bavaria
- Coordinates: 49°30′37″N 11°16′38″E
- Country: Germany
- State: Bavaria
- Admin. region: Mittelfranken
- District: Nürnberger Land
- Subdivisions: 29 Stadtteile

Government
  - Mayor (2020–26): Thomas Lang (FW)

Area
  - Total: 59.77 km^{2} (23.08 sq mi)
- Elevation: 327 m (1,073 ft)

Population (2025-12-31)
  - Total: 25,754
  - Density: 430.9/km^{2} (1,116/sq mi)
- Time zone: UTC+01:00 (CET)
  - Summer (DST): UTC+02:00 (CEST)
- Postal codes: 91207
- Dialling codes: 09123 (09126)
- Vehicle registration: LAU, ESB, HEB, N, PEG
- Website: www.lauf.de

Lauf an der Pegnitz (German pronunciation: [ˈlaʊf ʔan deːɐ̯ ˈpeːɡnɪts], lit. 'Lauf on the Pegnitz'; Northern Bavarian: Lauf an da Pegnitz) is a town east of Nuremberg, Germany. It is the capital of the Nürnberger Land district in Bavaria. It is in the Pegnitz river valley, which flows through the town.

In 2009, the municipality developed a climate protection plan which was supported by the German Ministry for the Environment.

== Twin towns – sister cities ==
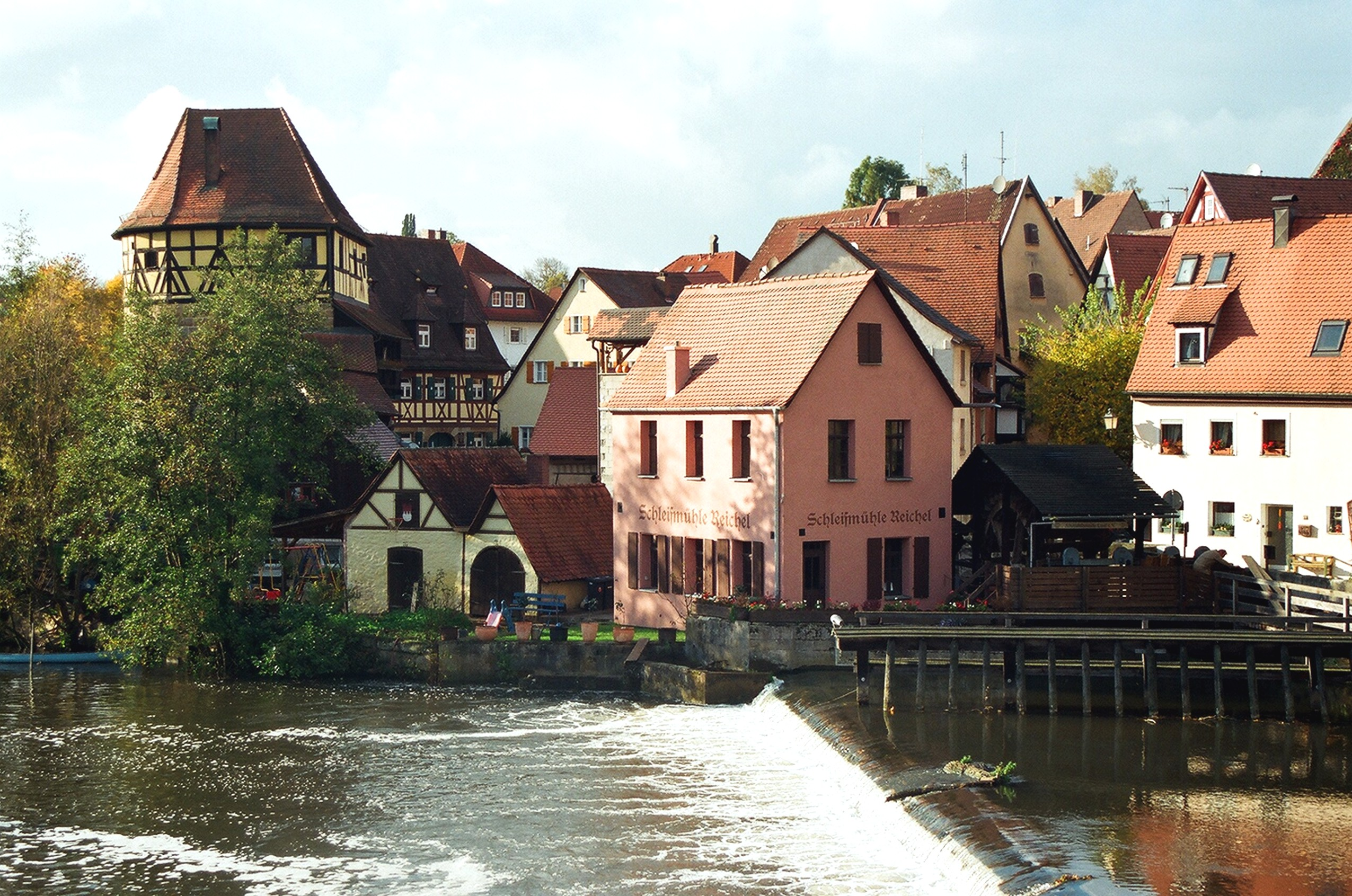
View to the old town and Pegnitz

Lauf an der Pegnitz is twinned with:

- Brive-la-Gaillarde, France
- Drama, Greece
- Nyköping, Sweden
- Tirschenreuth, Germany

== Notable people ==
- Hermann Roesler (1834–1894), economist
- Martin Lauer (1937–2019), athlete, Olympic medalist, lived here
- Martin Jellinghaus (born 1944), athlete, Olympic medalist
- Marlene Mortler (born 1955), politician (CSU), Member of the Bundestag (2002–2019), Member of the European Parliament
- Timo Rost (born 1978), footballer
