= Rednitzhembach =

- Municipality
- Coat of arms

- Location of Rednitzhembach within Roth district
- Interactive map of Rednitzhembach
- Location within Germany Location within Bavaria
- Coordinates: 49°18′19″N 11°04′13″E
- Country: Germany
- State: Bavaria
- Admin. region: Mittelfranken
- District: Roth
- Subdivisions: 7 districts

Government
  - Mayor (2020–26): Jürgen Spahl (Ind.)

Area
  - Total: 13.01 km^{2} (5.02 sq mi)
- Elevation: 327 m (1,073 ft)

Population (2025-12-31)
  - Total: 6,922
  - Density: 532.1/km^{2} (1,378/sq mi)
- Time zone: UTC+01:00 (CET)
  - Summer (DST): UTC+02:00 (CEST)
- Postal codes: 91126
- Dialling codes: 09122
- Vehicle registration: RH
- Website: www.rednitzhembach.de

Rednitzhembach is municipality in the district of Roth in Bavaria in Germany. It is located 18 kilometers south of the Nuremberg-Fürth city axis, five kilometers southeast of Schwabach and six kilometers north of Roth.
