= Kammerstein =

- Municipality
- Coat of arms

- Location of Kammerstein within Roth district
- Interactive map of Kammerstein
- Location within Germany Location within Bavaria
- Coordinates: 49°17′N 10°58′E
- Country: Germany
- State: Bavaria
- Admin. region: Mittelfranken
- District: Roth
- Subdivisions: 16 districts

Government
  - Mayor (2020–26): Wolfram Göll (CSU)

Area
  - Total: 37.08 km^{2} (14.32 sq mi)
- Elevation: 424 m (1,391 ft)

Population (2025-12-31)
  - Total: 3,046
  - Density: 82.15/km^{2} (212.8/sq mi)
- Time zone: UTC+01:00 (CET)
  - Summer (DST): UTC+02:00 (CEST)
- Postal codes: 91126
- Dialling codes: 09122, 09178
- Vehicle registration: RH
- Website: www.kammerstein.de

Kammerstein (German pronunciation: [ˈkamɐʃtaɪn]) is a municipality in the district of Roth in Bavaria in Germany.
