= Roth (district) =

Coordinates: 49°15′N 11°05′E

- District
- Flag Coat of arms
- Country: Germany
- State: Bavaria
- Adm. region: Middle Franconia
- Capital: Roth

Government
  - District admin.: Ben Schwarz (SPD)

Area
  - Total: 895 km^{2} (346 sq mi)

Population (31 December 2025)
  - Total: 128,210
  - Density: 143/km^{2} (371/sq mi)
- Time zone: UTC+01:00 (CET)
  - Summer (DST): UTC+02:00 (CEST)
- Vehicle registration: RH, HIP
- Website: www.landkreis-roth.de

Roth is a Landkreis (district) in Middle Franconia, Bavaria, Germany. It is bounded by (from the northeast and clockwise) the districts of Nürnberger Land, Neumarkt, Eichstätt, Weißenburg-Gunzenhausen, Ansbach and Fürth, and the cities of Schwabach and Nürnberg.

In medieval times the area was ruled by many lords. Brandenburg-Ansbach and Nuremberg owned possessions in the territory, and other parts were the property of clerical states. When these clerical states were dissolved in 1803, the territory fell to Bavaria.

The district was established in 1972 through the merger of the former districts of Roth, Schwabach and Hilpoltstein.

== Coat of arms ==
The coat of arms displays:
- the black and white pattern of the Hohenzollern family, symbolising Brandenburg-Ansbach
- a bishop's staff, symbolising the clerical states
- a rose from the arms of the city of Roth

== Towns and municipalities ==
Clickable map of towns and municipalities in the district

Towns
Municipalities

1. Abenberg
2. Greding
3. Heideck
4. Hilpoltstein
5. Roth
6. Spalt
1. Allersberg
2. Büchenbach
3. Georgensgmünd
4. Kammerstein
5. Rednitzhembach
6. Rohr
7. Röttenbach
8. Schwanstetten
9. Thalmässing
10. Wendelstein
