= Roth, Bavaria =

Roth
- Town
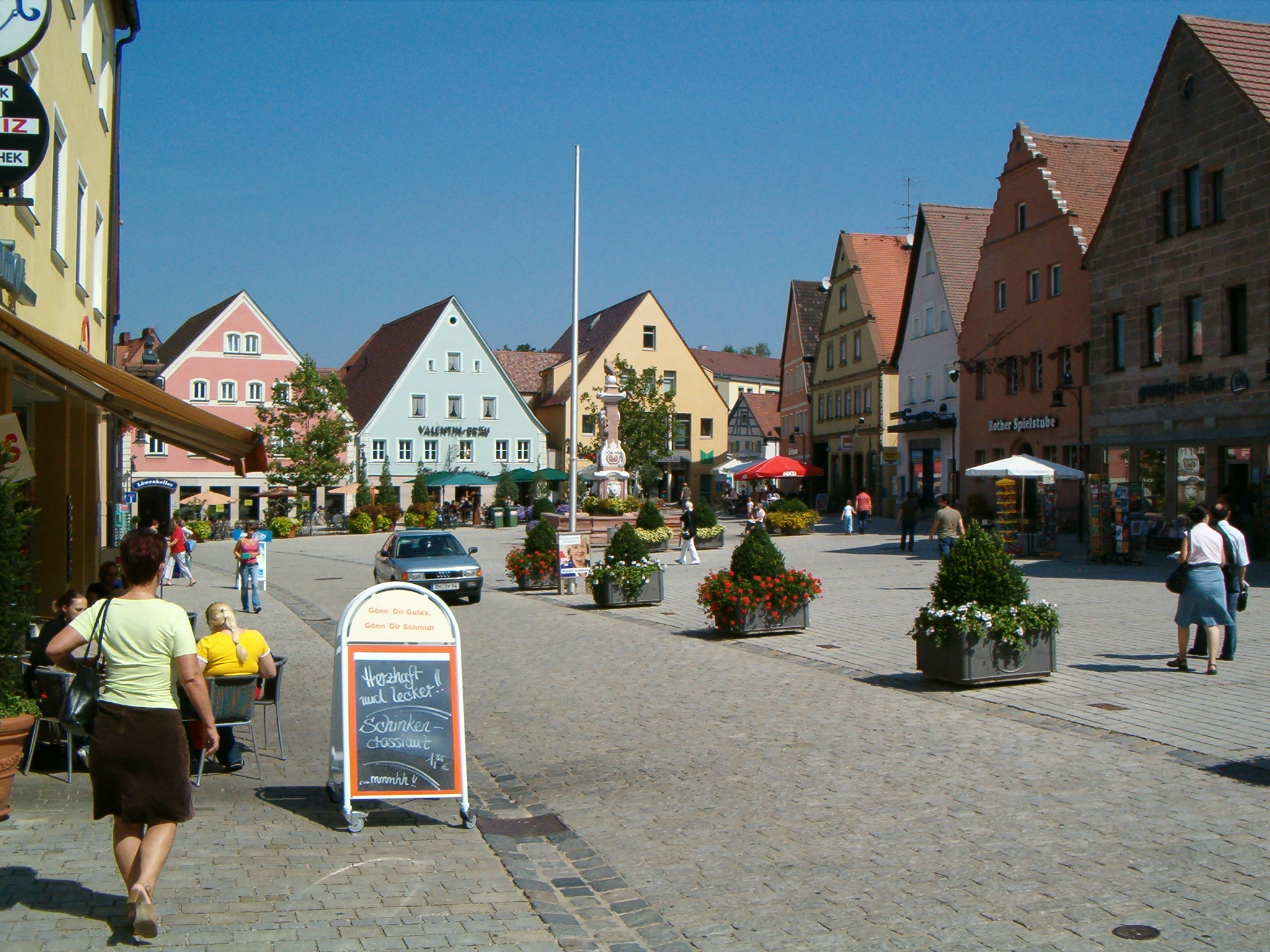
- Market square

- Coat of arms

- Location of Roth within Roth district
- Interactive map of Roth
- Location within Germany Location within Bavaria
- Coordinates: 49°14′46″N 11°5′28″E
- Country: Germany
- State: Bavaria
- Admin. region: Middle Franconia
- District: Roth
- Subdivisions: 20 districts

Government
  - Mayor (2022–28): Andreas Buckreus (SPD)

Area
  - Total: 96.33 km^{2} (37.19 sq mi)
- Elevation: 339 m (1,112 ft)

Population (2025-12-31)
  - Total: 25,473
  - Density: 264.4/km^{2} (684.9/sq mi)
- Time zone: UTC+01:00 (CET)
  - Summer (DST): UTC+02:00 (CEST)
- Postal codes: 91154
- Dialling codes: 09171
- Vehicle registration: RH
- Website: www.stadt-roth.de

Roth (German pronunciation: [ʁoːt]; formerly Roth bei Nürnberg) is a town in Bavaria, Germany, the capital of the Roth District. It is located about 25 kilometres (16 miles) south of Nuremberg.

== History ==
The town was first mentioned in documents in the year 1060, but settlements at its location date back much further. During the Middle Ages the town was given the right to grant asylum within the city walls. Later this tradition attracted Huguenot refugees who had to flee France because of religious persecution. They brought with them knowledge about the making of wires and founded an industry in Roth which exists until today. It plays host to a yearly Jazz & Blues festival and the Datev Challenge Roth triathlon race.

== Main sights ==
The main tourist attraction is the Ratibor Castle, a castle built as a hunting lodge by the Margraves of Brandenburg-Ansbach between 1535 and 1538.

After years of neglect it was sold in 1792 to Johann Philipp Stieber. After being used for nearly a century as court of justice and factory it was refurbished as residence for the Stieber family (created Barons of Stieber by Ludwig III of Bavaria in 1917) between 1892 and 1916.

Different styles were used to redecorate the castle varying from German Renaissance to Louis XVI. The masterpiece of the central block of the four wing castle is the so-called "Prunksaal" with a decoration in Neo-Venetian-Baroque. The painter Ferdinand Wagner the Younger was responsible for most of the paintings in the castle. In 1942 Freifrau Minna von Stieber offered the castle to the town of Roth as a present. Today a museum, a restaurant, the municipal library and the offices and meeting rooms of the town council occupy most parts of the castle.

The Protestant Church was built in the Late Gothic Style between 1511 and 1513. The older Romanesque Tower was incorporated in the building. In 1738 the church was redecorated by Johann David Steingruber in a severe Baroque Style typical for Protestant churches at that time.

After the fire of 1878 a new Neo-Gothic tower was built in the middle axis of the church. Altar and other furnishings were also added during that time.

== Twin towns – sister cities ==
Roth is twinned with:

- Opava, Czech Republic
- Racibórz, Poland
- Regen, Germany
- Xinbei (Changzhou), China
- (United Kingdom) Brentwood, Essex, Great Britain

== Notable people ==
- Johann Matthias Gesner (1691–1761), classical scholar and schoolmaster
- Ralf Speth (born 1955), British-German automotive executive
- Ralph Edelhäußer (born 1973), German politician
- Patrick Lange (born 1981), conductor
