= Anlauter =

River in southern Germany

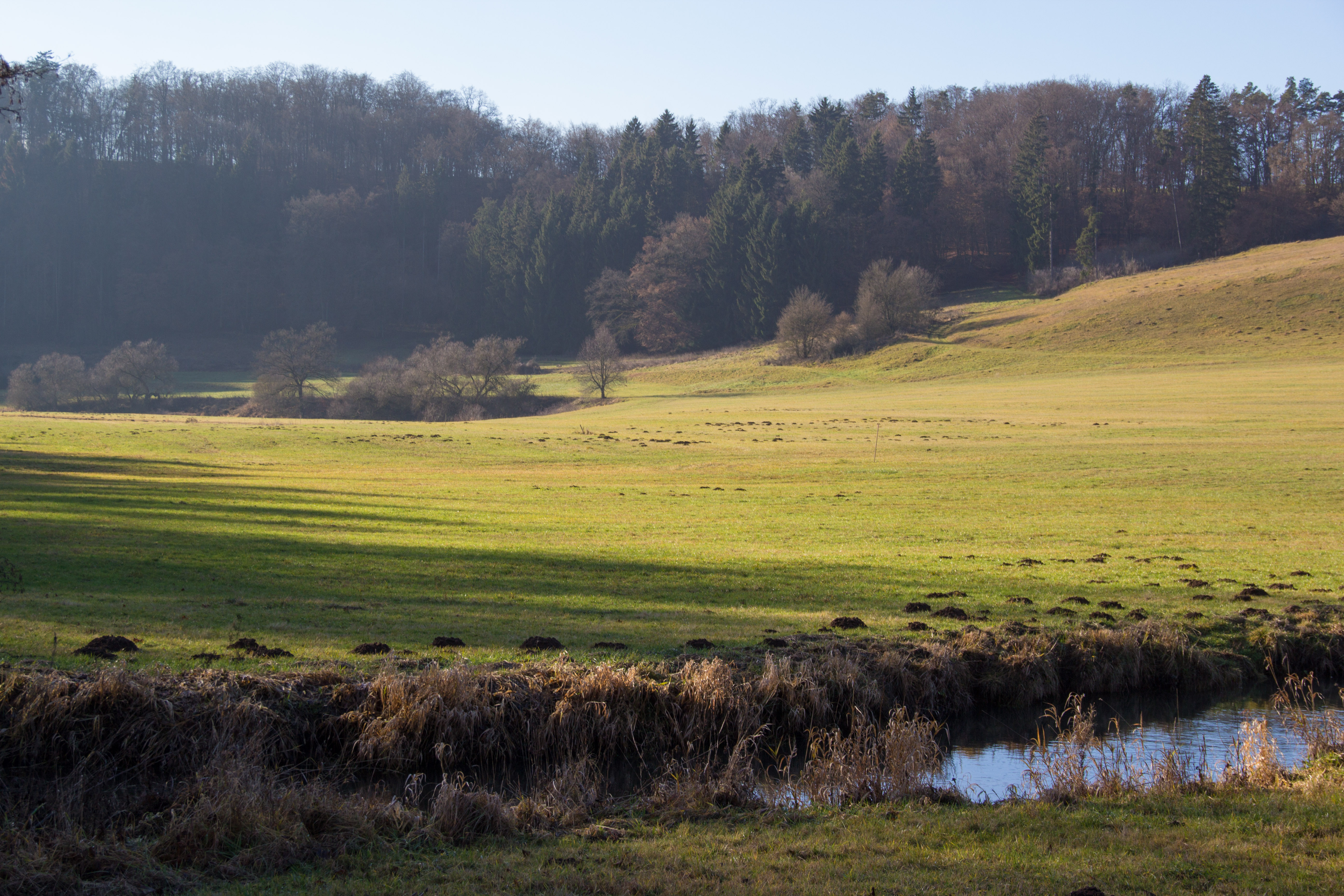
- The Anlauter near Bechthal (part of Raitenbuch)

- Location of mouth in Bavaria

Location
- Country: Germany
- State: Bavaria

Physical characteristics
- Mouth
  - location: Schwarzach
  - coordinates: 49.0012°N 11.3723°E
- Length: 35.6 km (22.1 mi)
- Basin size: 189 km^{2} (73 sq mi)

Basin features
- Progression: Schwarzach→ Altmühl→ Danube→ Black Sea

The Anlauter is a 29-kilometre long tributary of the Schwarzach, located in the Franconian Jura of Bavaria, Germany.

== Geography ==
The Anlauter rises on the outskirts of the village of Geyern (a part of Bergen), with its source being the pond Zeiselweiher.

== See also ==
- List of rivers of Bavaria
