= Schlangenbach (Altmühl) =

River in Germany

Location
- Country: Germany
- States: Bavaria

Physical characteristics
- Mouth
  - location: Altmühl
  - coordinates: 49.0869°N 10.7894°E

Basin features
- Progression: Altmühl→ Danube→ Black Sea

Schlangenbach is a nearly 7 km long stream in the area of the municipality of Dittenheim in the district of Weißenburg-Gunzenhausen, Bavaria, Germany, which flows into the Altmühl from the right near Windsfeld (a borough of Dittenheim) after an northeasterly course. It stretches approximately 6.9 km and drains an area of around 14.1 km².

== Geography ==
=== Course ===
Its source is southwest of Sammenheim (a borough of Dittenheim) at an altitude of around 482m above sea level at a path junction in the flat northern foothills of the Hahnenkamm in the Altmühltal Nature Park, not far from the municipal boundary with Gnotzheim. It flows further, alternating between a northerly and northeasterly direction through open countryside in the Altmühl valley. The stream flows past Sammenheim and under the district roads WUG 26 and WUG 28. It then takes in two unnamed tributaries north of Sammenheim. It then crosses Sausenhofen and passes Windsfeld in the west. After a total course of around 6.9 km, it flows into the river Unterasbach just above Windsfeld and opposite the Gunzenhausen village of Unterasbach at an altitude of around 412m above sea level.

== See also ==
- List of rivers of Bavaria
