= Pleinfeld =

- Municipality
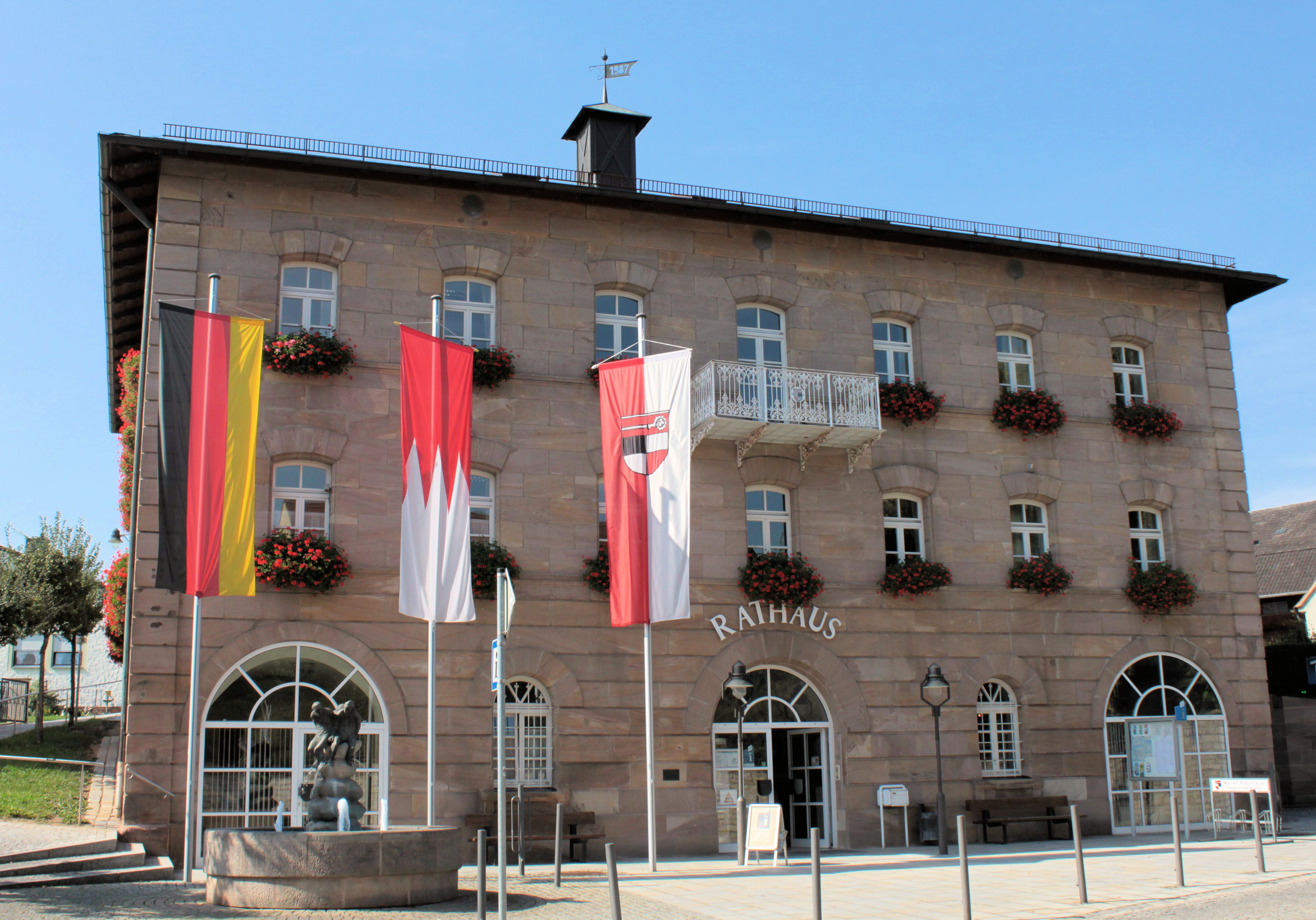
- Pleinfeld town hall

- Coat of arms

- Location of Pleinfeld within Weißenburg-Gunzenhausen district
- Interactive map of Pleinfeld
- Location within Germany Location within Bavaria
- Coordinates: 49°6′N 10°58′E
- Country: Germany
- State: Bavaria
- Admin. region: Mittelfranken
- District: Weißenburg-Gunzenhausen

Government
  - Mayor (2019–25): Stefan Frühwald (CSU)

Area
  - Total: 71.37 km^{2} (27.56 sq mi)
- Elevation: 382 m (1,253 ft)

Population (2025-12-31)
  - Total: 7,322
  - Density: 102.6/km^{2} (265.7/sq mi)
- Time zone: UTC+01:00 (CET)
  - Summer (DST): UTC+02:00 (CEST)
- Postal codes: 91785
- Dialling codes: 09144
- Vehicle registration: WUG
- Website: www.pleinfeld.de

Pleinfeld (German pronunciation: [ˈplaɪnfɛlt]) is a Franconian municipality and market town in the Weißenburg-Gunzenhausen district, in the German state of Bavaria. It is situated in the Metropolitan Area of Nuremberg and in the Franconian Lake District. Pleinfeld is a nationally recognized recreation area.

== Geography ==
Pleinfeld is located in central Bavaria, in the south of the administrative region Mittelfranken. The municipal area borders on the neighbouring Bavarian district Roth. Neighbouring townships are Pfofeld, Ellingen, Ettenstatt, Höttingen, Absberg, Spalt, Heideck and Röttenbach. The landscape is hilly and forested.

Pleinfeld is situated on the rivers Swabian Rezat and Arbach, 8 kilometres (5.0 mi) north of Weißenburg in Bayern, and 45 kilometres (28 mi) south of Nuremberg. Other rivers in the municipality area are Brombach river and Banzerbach river, both tributary of the Swabian Rezat. The town's altitude is around 382 metres (1,253 feet) above sea level. The highest point of the municipality is located near Dorsbrunn, 505 m (1,657 ft) asl. Pleinfeld is the biggest town at the Großer Brombachsee, a lake in the Franconian Lake District. Simultaneously, Pleinfeld is located on the most northern part of the Altmühl Valley Nature Park.

=== Administrative subdivisions ===
Pleinfeld has 35 subdivisions:

- Allmannsdorf
- Banzermühle
- Birklein
- Böschleinsmühle
- Dorsbrunn
- Engelreuth
- Erlingsdorf
- Gündersbach
- Heinzenmühle
- Hohenweiler
- Kemnathen
- Ketschenmühle
- Kleinweingarten
- Langweidmühle
- Mackenmühle
- Mandlesmühle
- Mannholz
- Mäusleinsmühle
- Mischelbach
- Pleinfeld
- Prexelmühle
- Ramsberg am Brombachsee
- Regelsberg
- Reichertsmühle
- Roxfeld
- Sankt Veit
- Schloss Sandsee
- Seemannsmühle
- Stirn
- Utzenmühle
- Veitserlbach
- Walkerszell
- Walting
- Wurmmühle

== History ==
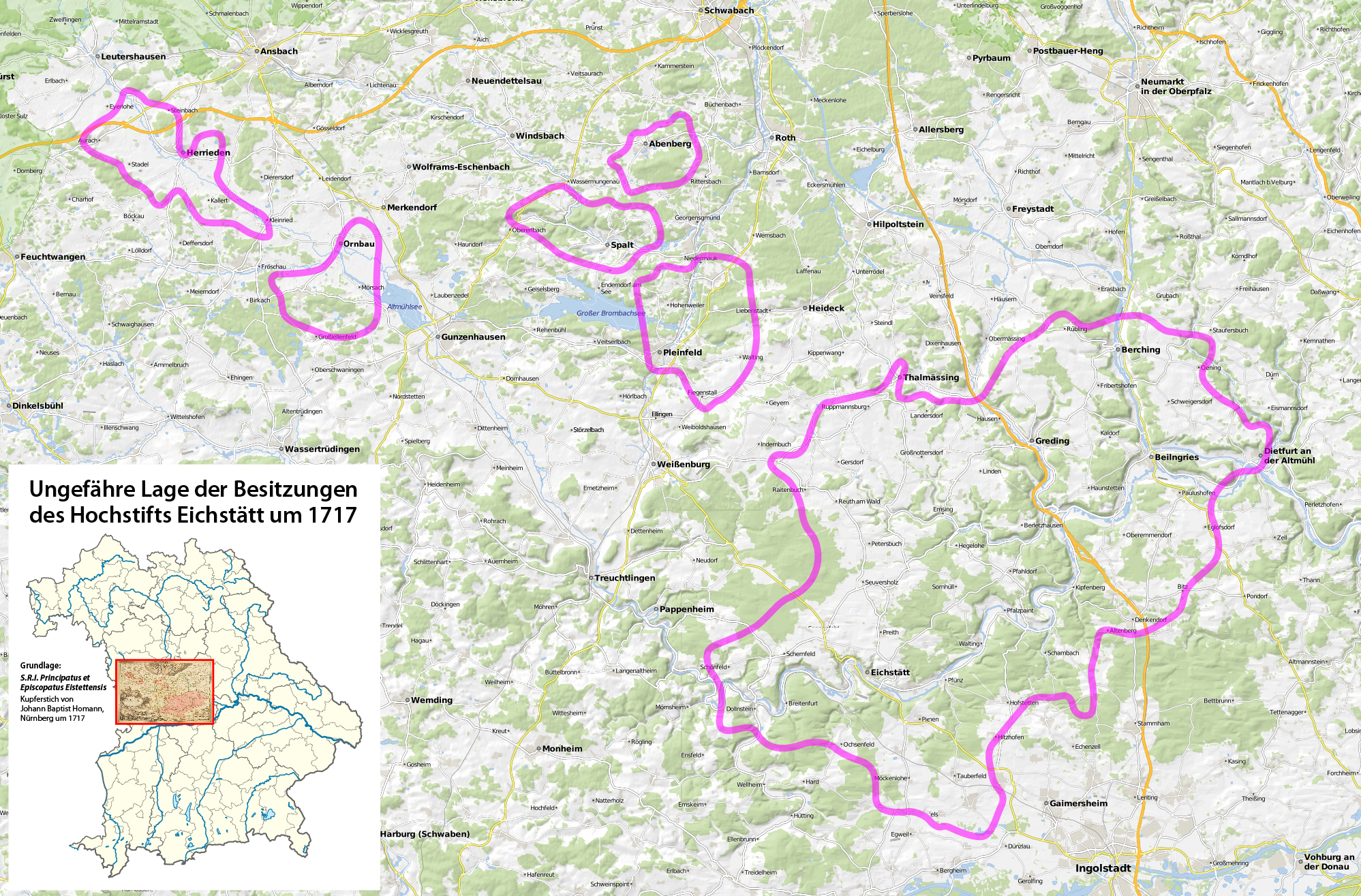
Map of the Bishopric of Eichstätt with its exclaves Herrieden, Ornbau, Spalt, Pleinfeld und Abenberg

The origins of the town date back to the 7th century. Pleinfeld was first mentioned in 770. In medieval and early modern period Pleinfeld was part of Prince-Bishopric of Eichstätt and remained under their jurisdiction until the late 18th century. During the Thirty Years' War the population decreased very sharply. Pleinfeld becomes part of Bavaria in 1803 by the process of mediatisation. The train station was opened at 1 October 1849. Parts of Pleinfeld were damaged in April 1945 by an Allied bombing raid, but large parts of the old town remained undamaged. The reorganisation of communities in Bavaria between 1972 and 1978 meant that Pleinfeld came in charge of the previously independent surrounding villages, enlarging the town in size and population. The Franconian Lake District has made Pleinfeld a tourist destination in 21st century.

== Transportation ==
Pleinfeld has a railway station at the Nuremberg–Augsburg railway and the Pleinfeld-Gunzenhausen railway, which is served every 30 minutes on weekdays. By the Bundesstraße 2 and its three junctions as well as the nearby Bundesstraße 13 it is well connected to Nuremberg, Augsburg, Ingolstadt and Ansbach. The town is served by several local buses.

== Religion ==
Like most of Bavaria, Pleinfeld is predominantly Roman Catholic. There are nine Roman Catholic churches (four parish churches among them), one Evangelical Lutheran parish church and a Kingdom Hall for Jehovah's Witnesses. There are six cemeteries overall.

== Politics ==
Stefan Frühwald has held the office of mayor since May 2019. He is a member of the CSU political party.

== Culture and places of interest ==
=== Architecture ===
Pleinfeld's old town is surrounded by an early modern town wall with a fortified gate, the Spalter Tor, as landmark building. The wall was erected in the 16th century. Several fountains, statues and historic buildings including the town hall, the castle and the Saint Nicholas Church are in the old town. The center is the market square. Several mills are lined up along the river in the north of Pleinfeld, starting nearby the old town. Other points of interests are the Sandsee castle on a hill northeast of the town and the Saint John of Nepomuk bridge, an old stone bridge.

=== Museums ===
The Pleinfeld local history museum shows the history of the town and of the old tradition to brew beer.

=== Upper Germanic-Rhaetian Limes ===
Since 2005, the Upper Germanic-Rhaetian Limes, a 550-kilometre-long external frontier of the Roman Empire which runs through the Pleinfeld municipal area, is a UNESCO World Heritage Site.

== Economy ==
Several companies and plants are located in Pleinfeld including a plant of W. L. Gore and Associates. There are four industrial parks.

Tourism, retail, light industry and still agriculture are an important factor.

== Education ==
Pleinfeld has 4 kindergartens, one primary school, one Hauptschule, a music school and a private school which provides Montessori education. There is a library. The Mehrgenerationenhaus offers courses for adult education.

== Sports ==
In Pleinfeld several sports clubs are located. The two biggest are the Catholic sports club DJK Pleinfeld and the general sports club 1. FC/Vfl Pleinfeld which provides for instance football, athletics, table tennis and gymnastics. Furthermore, there are several Yacht clubs in the municipality.

The Pleinfeld Brombachhalle, which seats 1,400, is the county's largest arena. Nearby the arena is a public swimming pool.

The biggest sports event in Pleinfeld is the marathon every September.

The water sports center (Wassersportzentrum) of the University of Erlangen–Nuremberg is located in Pleinfeld.

== International relations ==
Pleinfeld is twinned with:

- (Republic of Ireland) - Killarney Ireland

== Local Dialect ==
The local dialect of the region is East Franconian German, referred to in German as Fränkisch, with Pleinfeld being at the southern point of its extension. Traveling south, people speak Bavarian German and Alemannic German dialects.

== Media ==
The local paper is the Weißenburger Tagblatt.

== Sons and daughters of the town ==
- Maurus Xaverius Herbst (1701-1757), Benedictine abbot
- Wilhelm Uebler (1899-1968), shot putter

== Photogallery ==
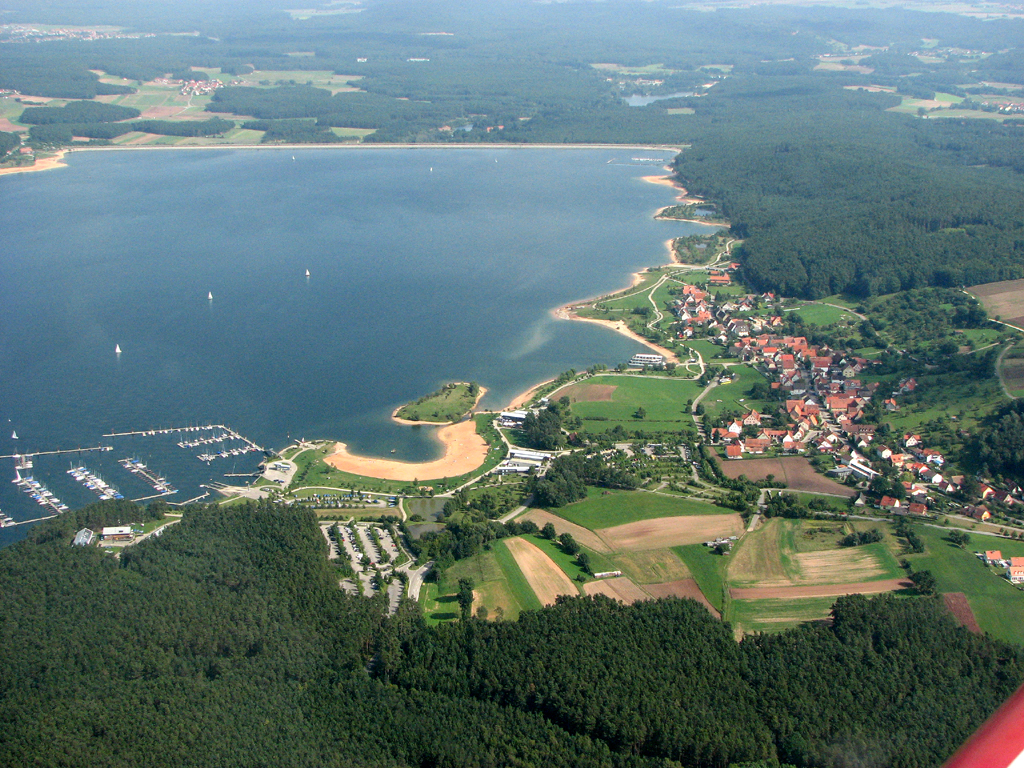
Lake

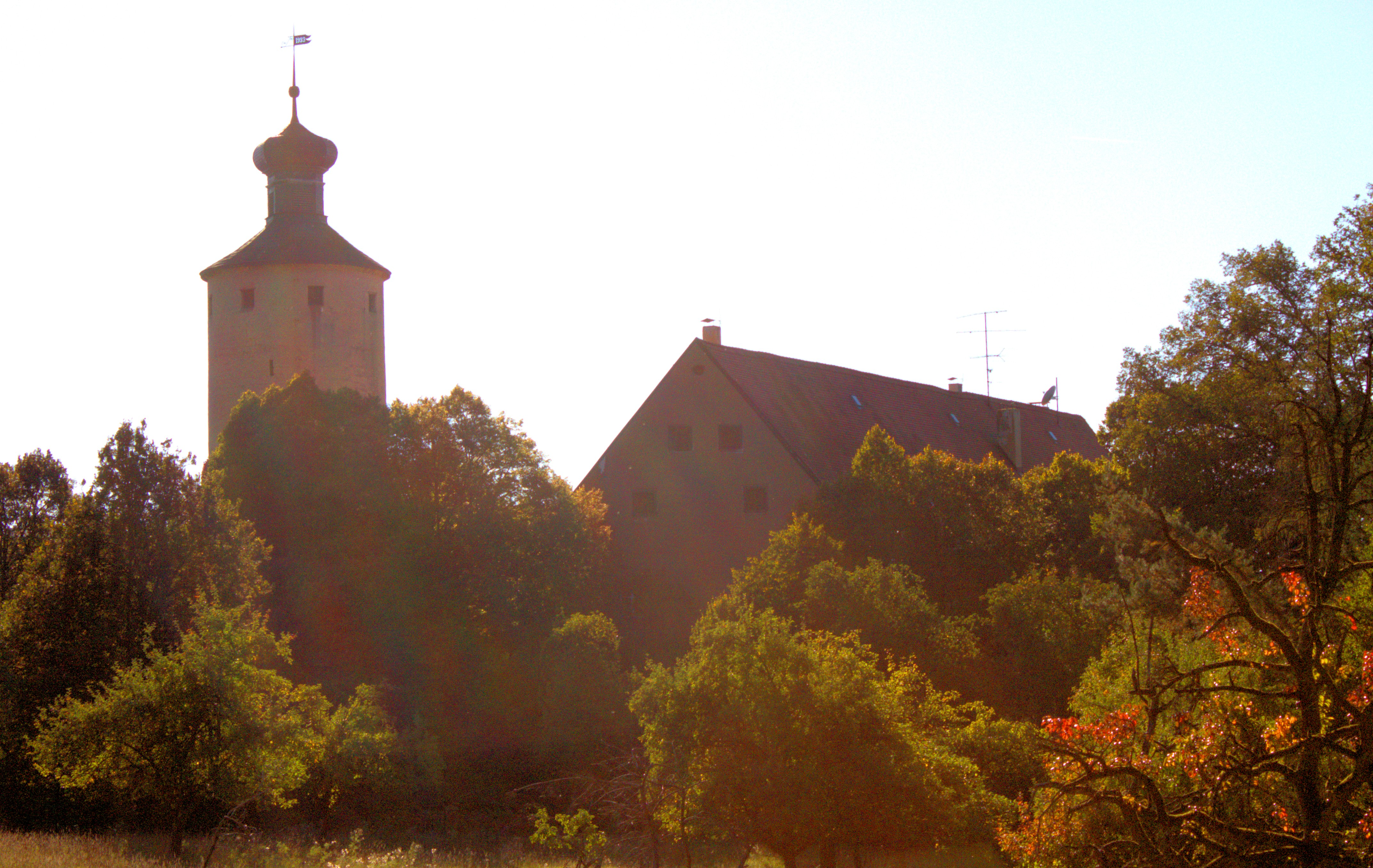
Sandsee Castle

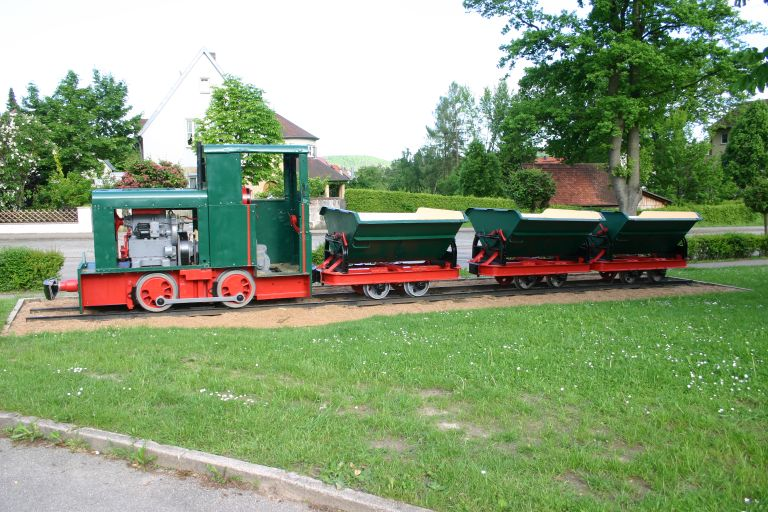
Former train, now a playground

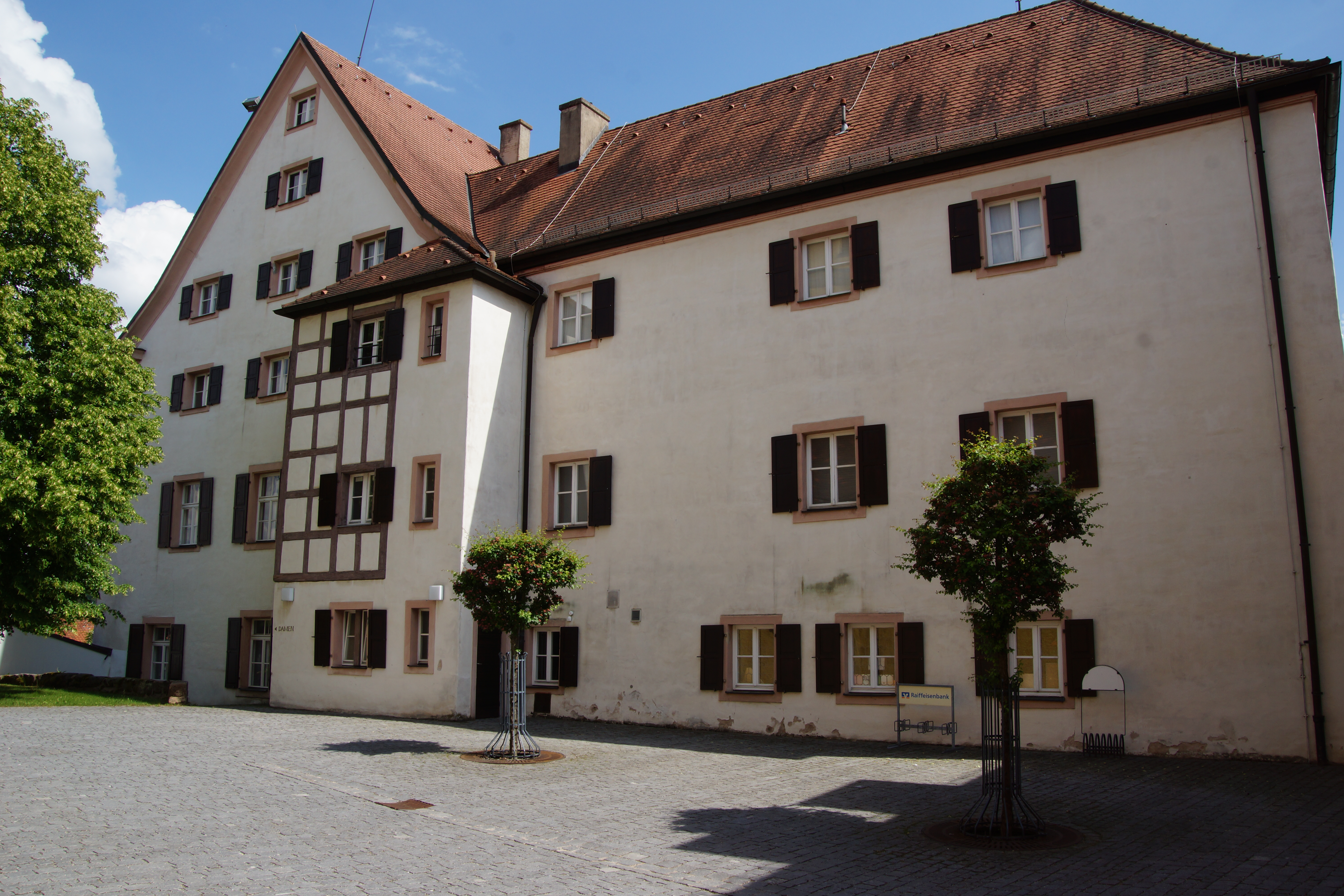
Museum in Pleinfeld town center

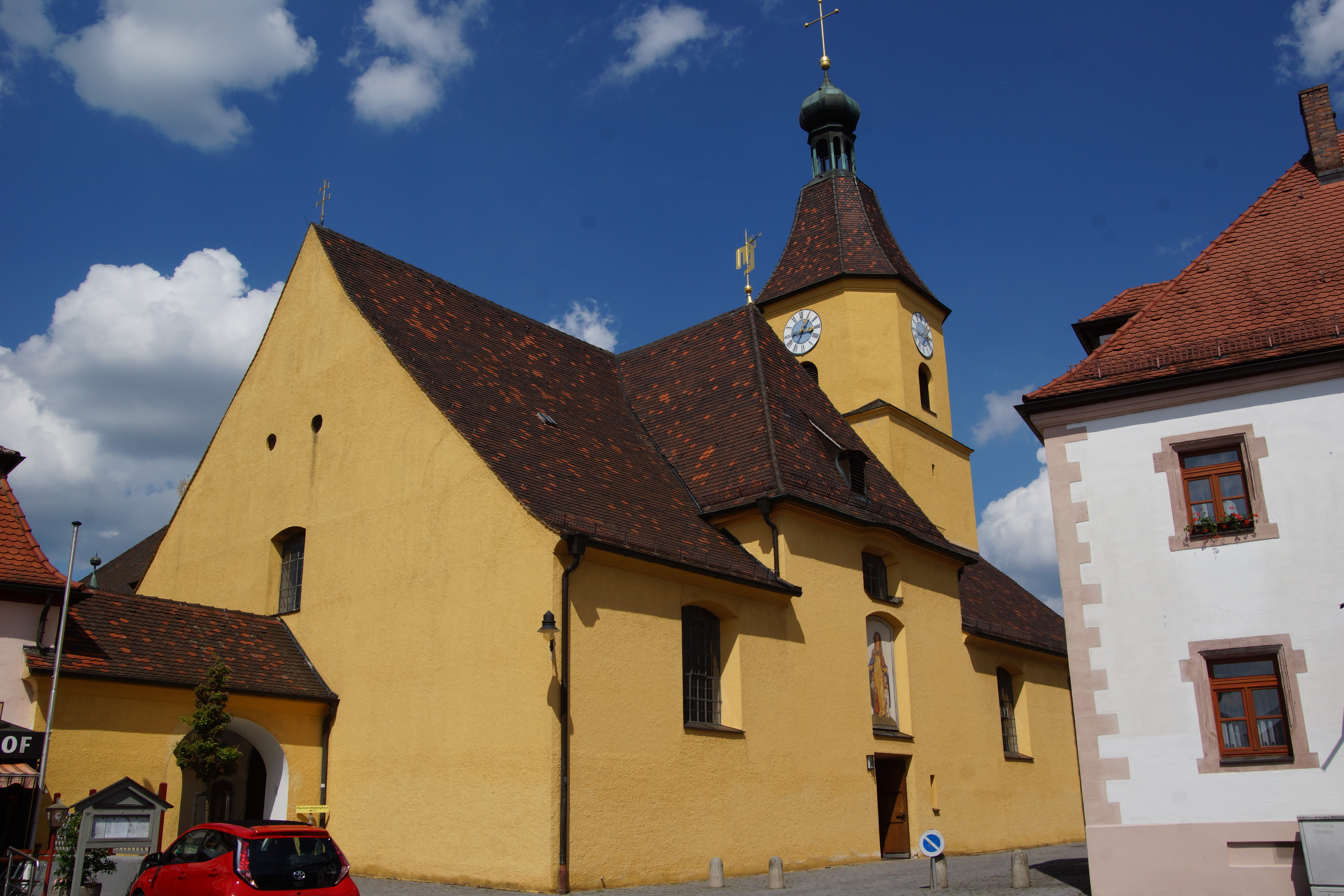
Church St. Nicholas

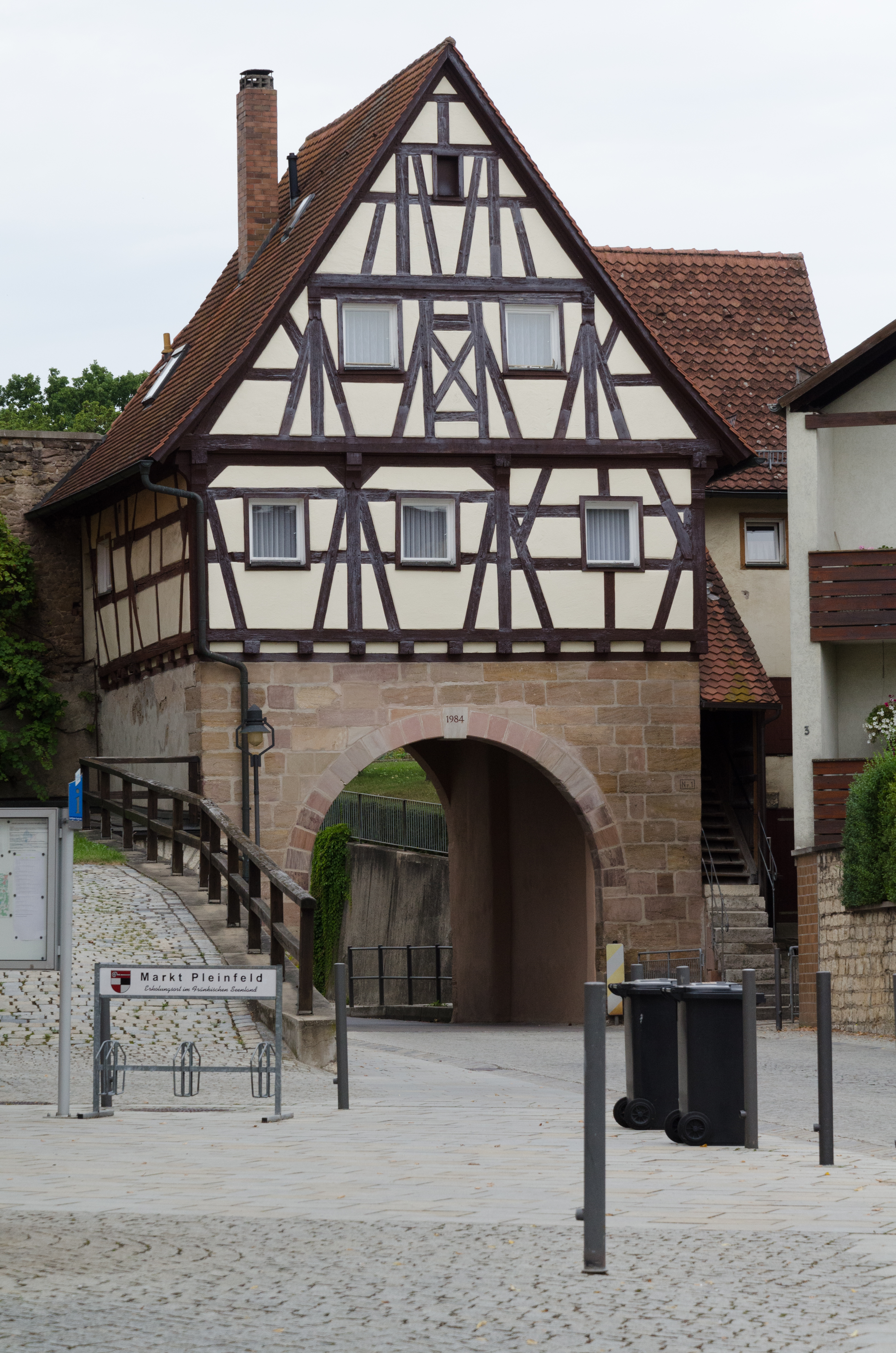
Gate "Spalter Tor"

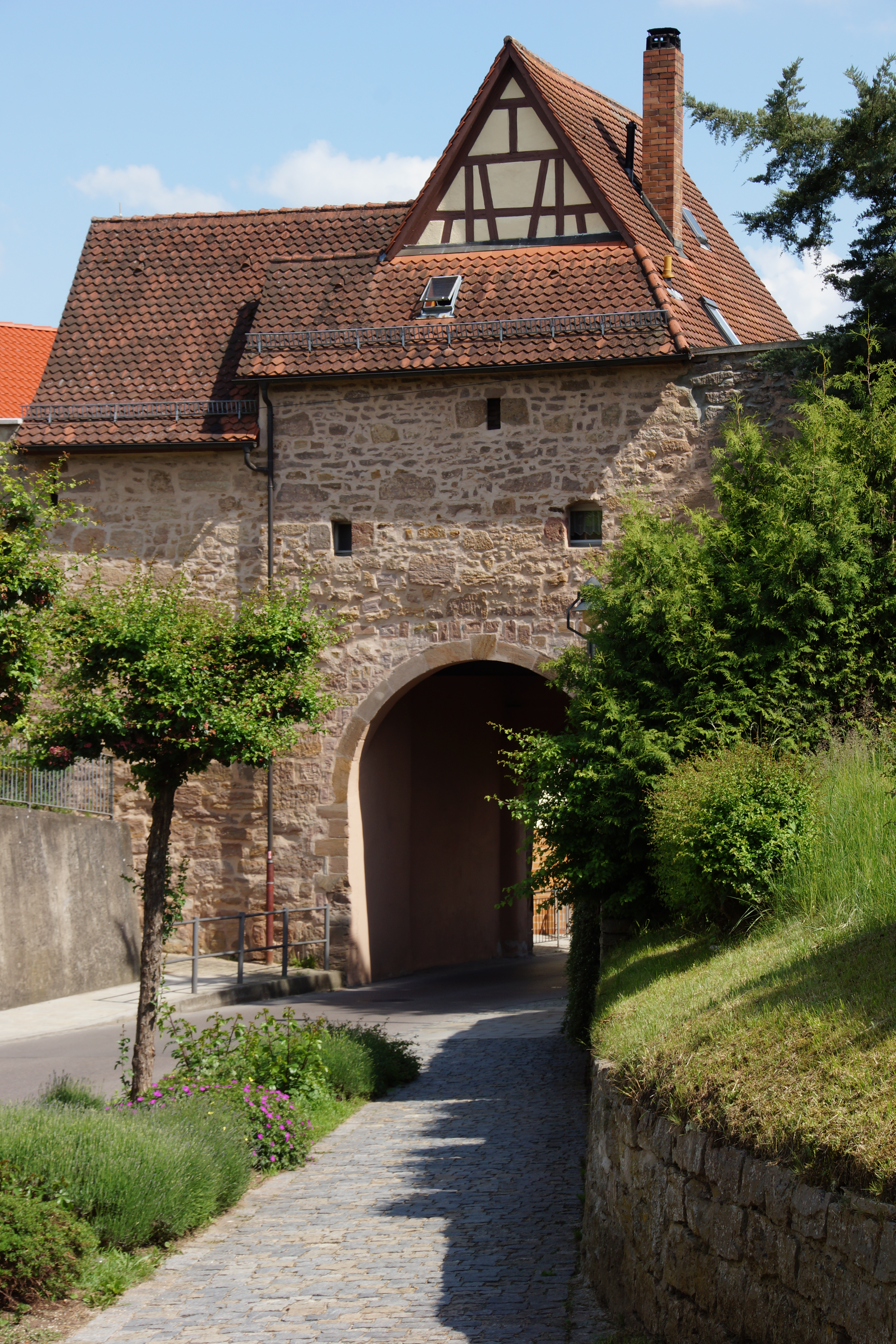
historic city wall

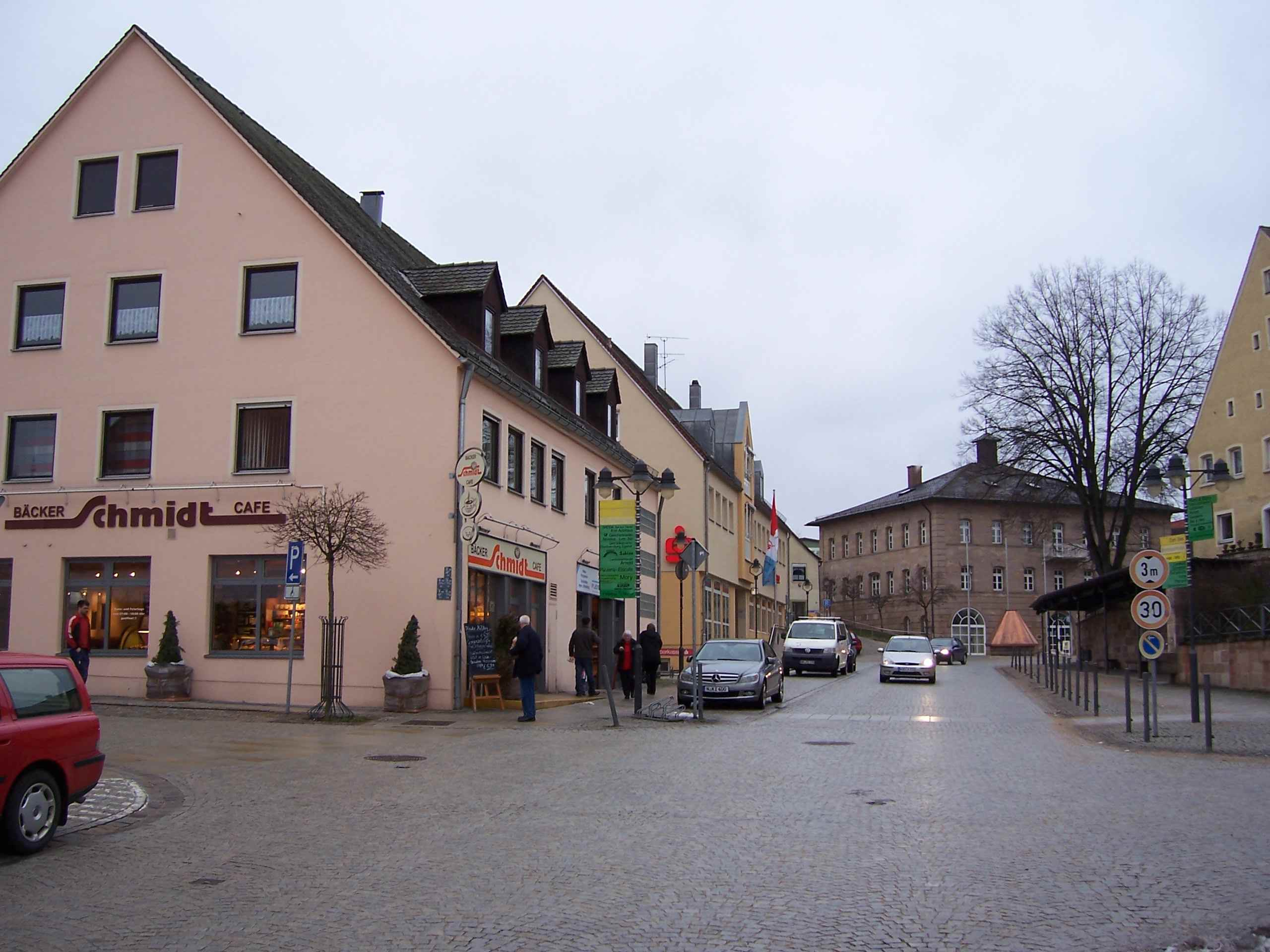
market square

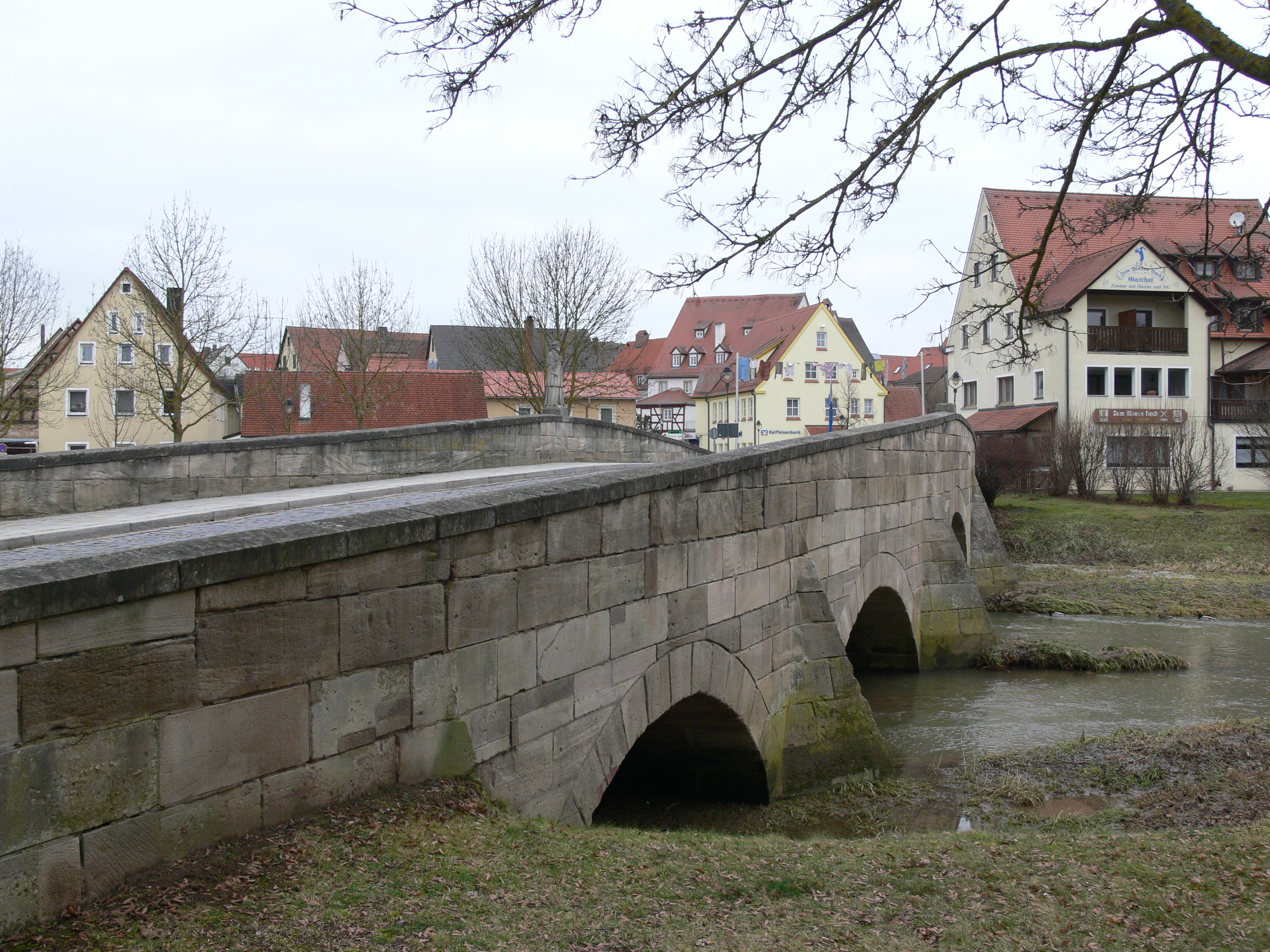
Saint Nepomuk Bridge

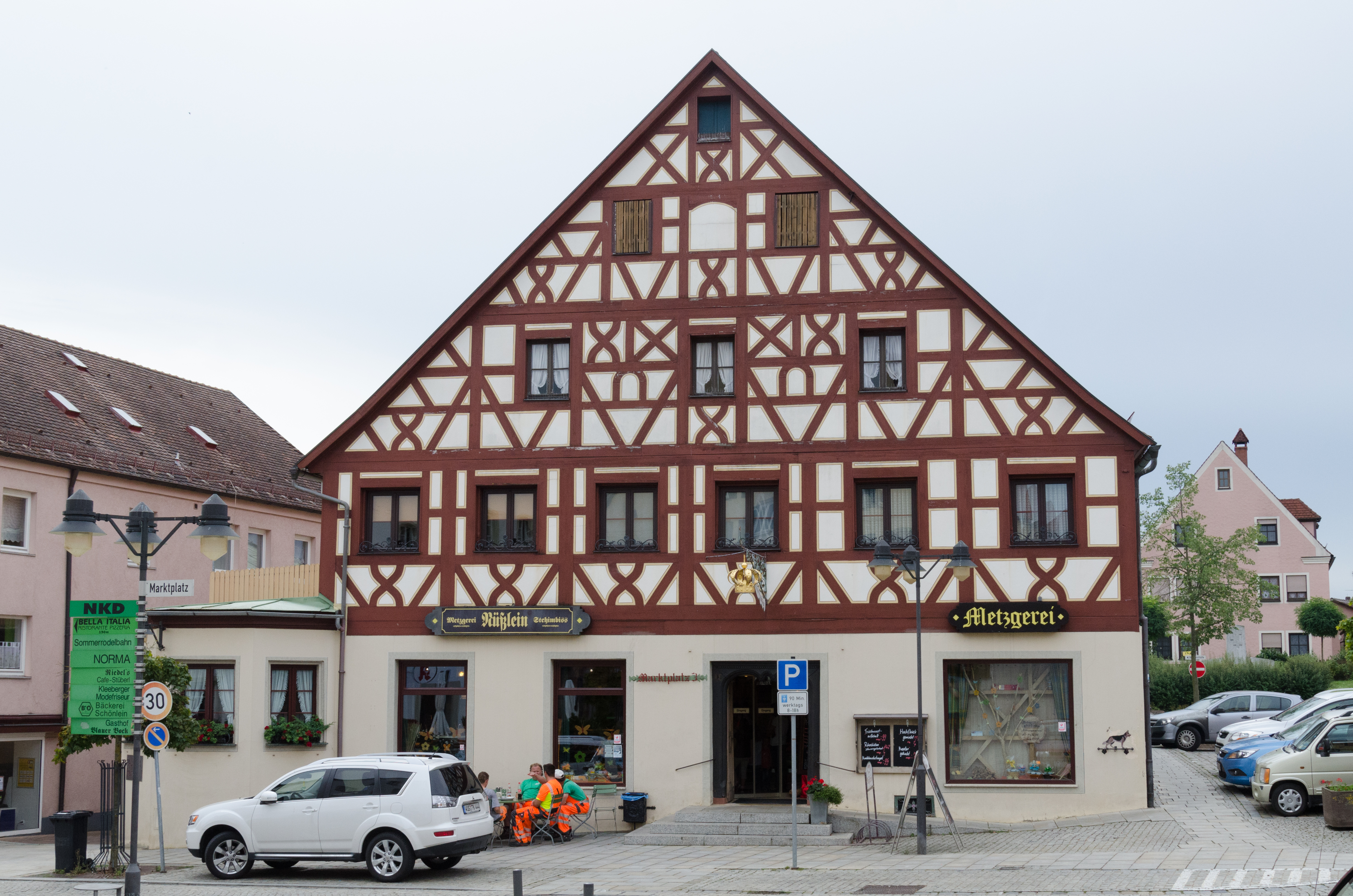
timber-framed house "Zur Krone"
