= Hahnenkamm =

Hahnenkamm (meaning "comb" in German) may refer to:

== Austria ==
- Hahnenkamm, Kitzbühel, a mountain of the Kitzbühel Alps, Tyrol
  - Hahnenkamm Races, an annual alpine skiing competition
- Hahnenkamm (Tannheim Mountains), a mountain of the Allgäu Alps

== Germany ==
- Hahnenkamm (Verwaltungsgemeinschaft), a federation of municipalities in Bavaria
- Hahnenkamm (Altmühl valley), a mountain ridge in Bavaria
- Hahnenkamm, Spessart, a mountain in the Spessart

== Greenland ==
- Hahnenkamm, Greenland, a mountain of the Stauning Alps
