= Mischelbach =

- Ortsteil of Pleinfeld
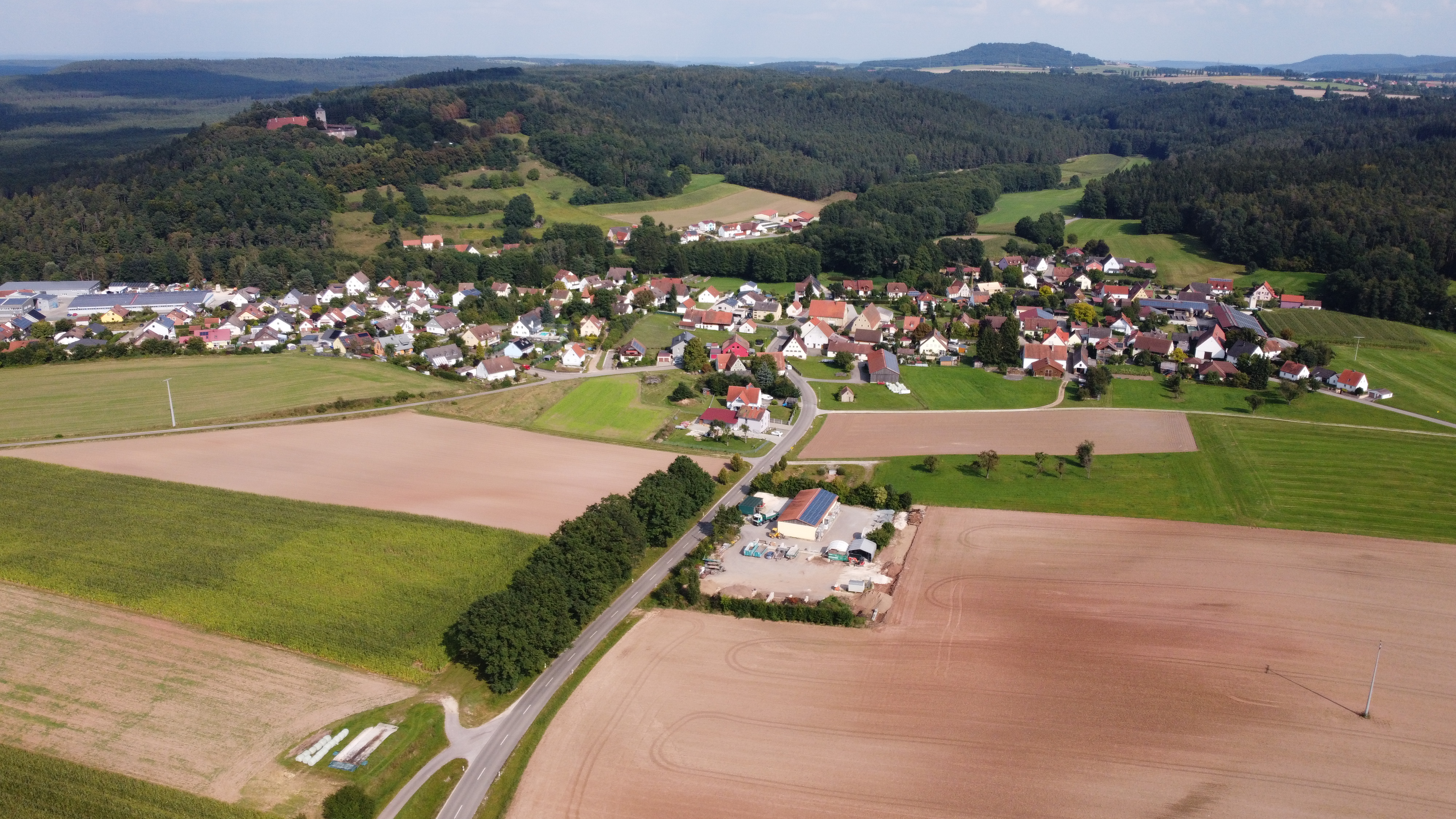
- Interactive map of Mischelbach
- Location within Germany Location within Bavaria
- Coordinates: 49°06′43″N 11°01′02″E
- Country: Germany
- State: Bavaria
- Admin. region: Mittelfranken
- District: Weißenburg-Gunzenhausen
- Municipality: Pleinfeld
- Elevation: 390 m (1,280 ft)

Population
  - Total: 400
- Time zone: UTC+01:00 (CET)
  - Summer (DST): UTC+02:00 (CEST)
- Postal codes: 91785
- Dialling codes: 09144

Mischelbach is a district of Pleinfeld in Bavaria, in the governmental district Central Franconia and administrative district Weißenburg-Gunzenhausen. The village has about 400 inhabitants.
