= Dürrenberg =

Mountain in Germany

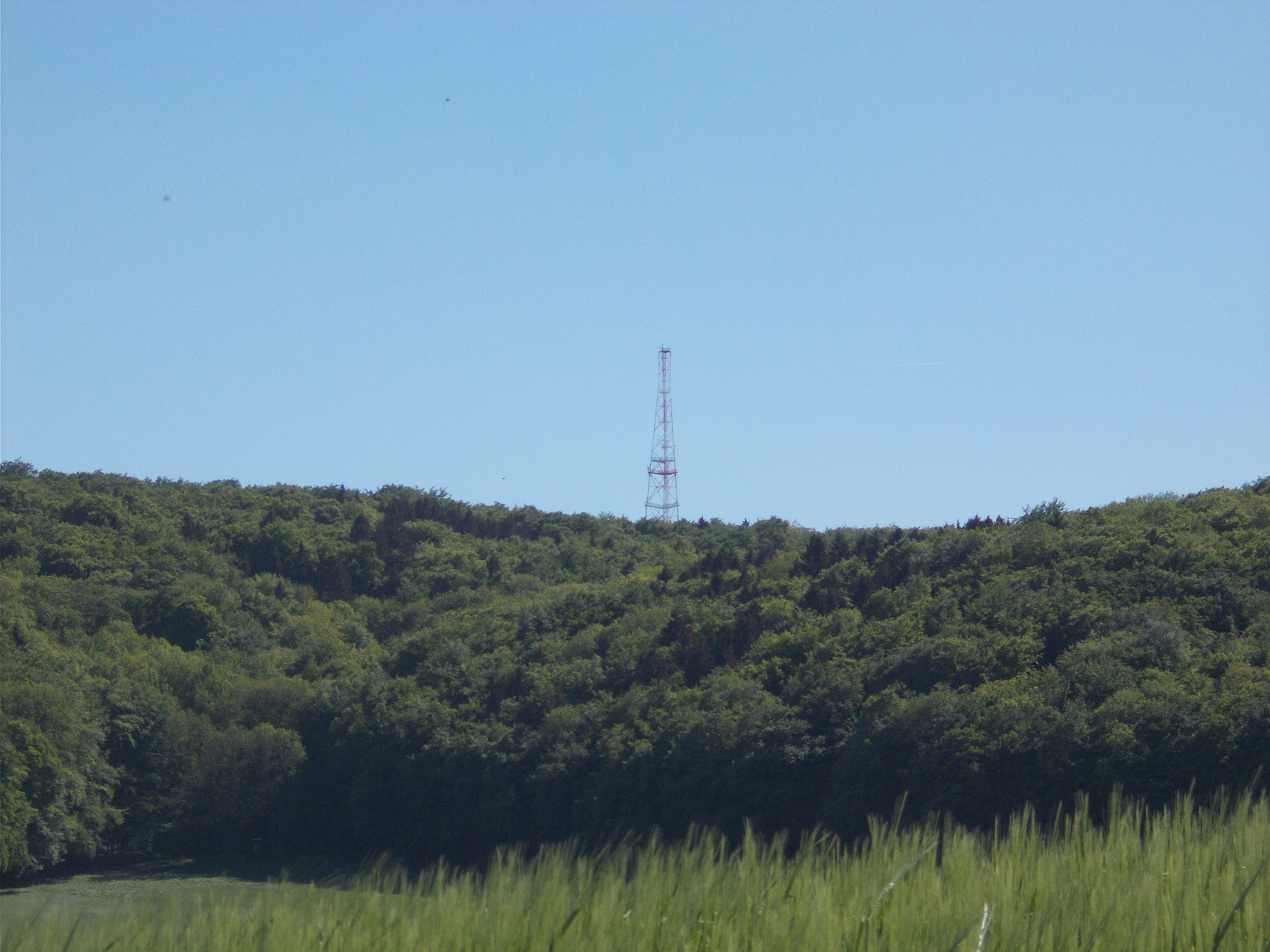

Highest point
- Elevation: 656.4 m (2,154 ft)
- Isolation: 17.24 km (10.71 mi) to P.673
- Coordinates: 49°00′59″N 10°45′54″E

Geography
- Location within Germany
- Location: Weißenburg-Gunzenhausen, Middle Franconia, Germany
- Parent range: Hahnenkamm

Dürrenberg (German pronunciation) (656.4 m above sea level) is a mountain of Bavaria. It is the highest point of the Weißenburg-Gunzenhausen district and of the Hahnenkamm and is situated between Heidenheim and Meinheim 60 km south west of Nuremberg, Germany.
