= Wolfgang Freyberg =

German historian and slavicist

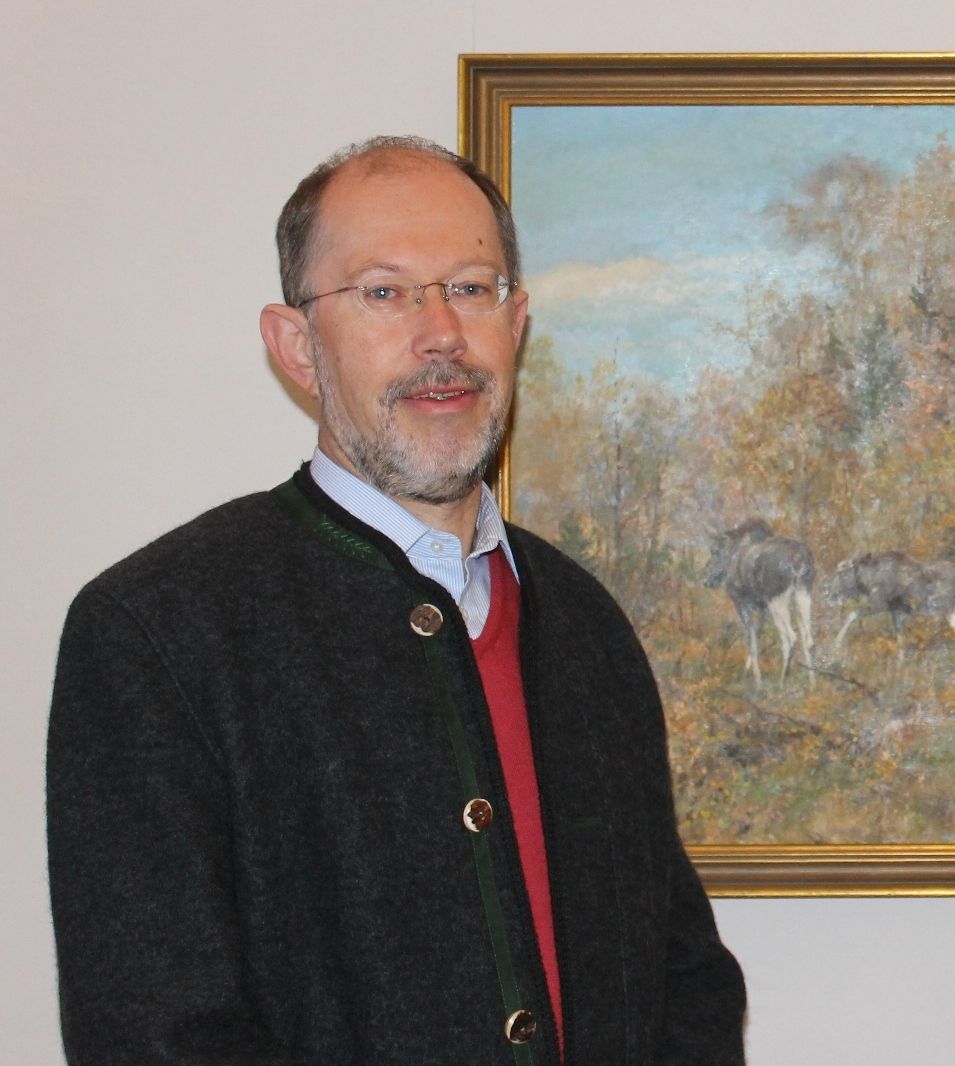
- Born: 12 April 1956
- Employer: Cultural Center East Prussia
- Political party: Christian Social Union in Bavaria
- Position held: museum director

Wolfgang Freyberg (born 12 April 1956) is a German historian and slavicist. Freyberg was born in Göttingen, Lower Saxony and studied at the University of Göttingen. Since 1985 he is the director of the Cultural Center East Prussia in Ellingen, Bavaria.
