= Syburg (disambiguation) =

Syburg may refer to:

- Syburg, the southernmost borough of Dortmund, North Rhine-Westphalia
  - Hohensyburg, a ruined castle in Dortmund-Syburg
  - Zeche Syburg, a coal mine in Dortmund-Syburg, now closed
- Syburg (Bergen), an area of Bergen, Middle Franconia, in Bavaria

== People ==
- Friedrich Wilhelm von Syburg (1709–1770), a Prussian major general
- Otto Ludwig von Syburg (1721–1788), another Prussian major general
