= Schlangenbach =

Schlangenbach may refer to:

- Schlangenbach (Altmühl), a river of Bavaria, Germany, tributary of the Altmühl
- Schlangenbach (Regnitz), a river of Bavaria, Germany, tributary of the Regnitz
