= Georg Bachmann =

German politician (1885–1971)

Georg Bachmann (6 December 1885 Westheim – 23 October 1971 Gunzenhausen) was a German politician. During his political career he represented the DNVP, CNBL and the Christian Social Union of Bavaria (CDU) during 1949 - 1954. From 1940 to 1945 he was a member of the Nazi Party. He was a member of the Landtag of Bavaria.

== Life ==
After completing elementary school and attending advanced training school in Westheim, Bachmann completed agricultural and cooperative training courses at the Nuremberg Business School. He worked in agricultural cooperatives from 1903, and did military service with the 6th Bavarian Chevauleger Regiment from 1906 to 1909 and was ultimately appointed as a non-commissioned officer. From 1914 to 1918 he took part in the First World War as a soldier. During the war he initially served with the Bavarian Reserve Cavalry Regiment No. 5, where he was promoted to vice-sergeant. After being wounded, he was transferred to the garrison administration in Fürth as an administrative inspector.

After the end of the war, Bachmann worked as a self-employed farmer in Westheim and continued to work part-time in agricultural cooperatives. He was managing director of the Middle Franconian Dairy Association in 1919, became its chairman in 1922, and in the same year chairman of the Bavarian Cooperative Association in Ansbach. He also served as chairman of the Middle Franconian District Loan Association and chairman of the Agricultural District Association in Heidenheim.

After the Second World War, Economics Counsel Bachmann was president of the Bavarian Raiffeisen Association and chairman of the supervisory board of its business establishments. He also served as third president of the Bavarian Farmers' Association, chairman of the State Association of Dairy Industry, and district attorney for Middle Franconia. He was also a member of the State Synod of the Evangelical Lutheran Church in Bavaria. From 1958 to 1963 he was also chairman of the supervisory board of the Bavarian Commodity Brokerage of Agricultural Cooperatives AG (BayWa).

== Literature ==
- Reichshandbuch der Deutschen Gesellschaft. Das Handbuch der Persönlichkeiten in Wort und Bild, Erster Band, Deutscher Wirtschaftsverlag, Berlin 1930, S. 49. Mikrofiche-Ausgabe, München: Saur, o. J. ISBN 3-598-30664-4

== See also ==
- List of Bavarian Christian Social Union politicians
