= Franz Hesselberger =

German industrialist and patron of the arts

Franz Hesselberger (March 12, 1876, in Munich, Kingdom of Bavaria – July 15, 1935, ibid.) was a German industrialist, councilor of commerce and patron of the arts.

== Life and work ==
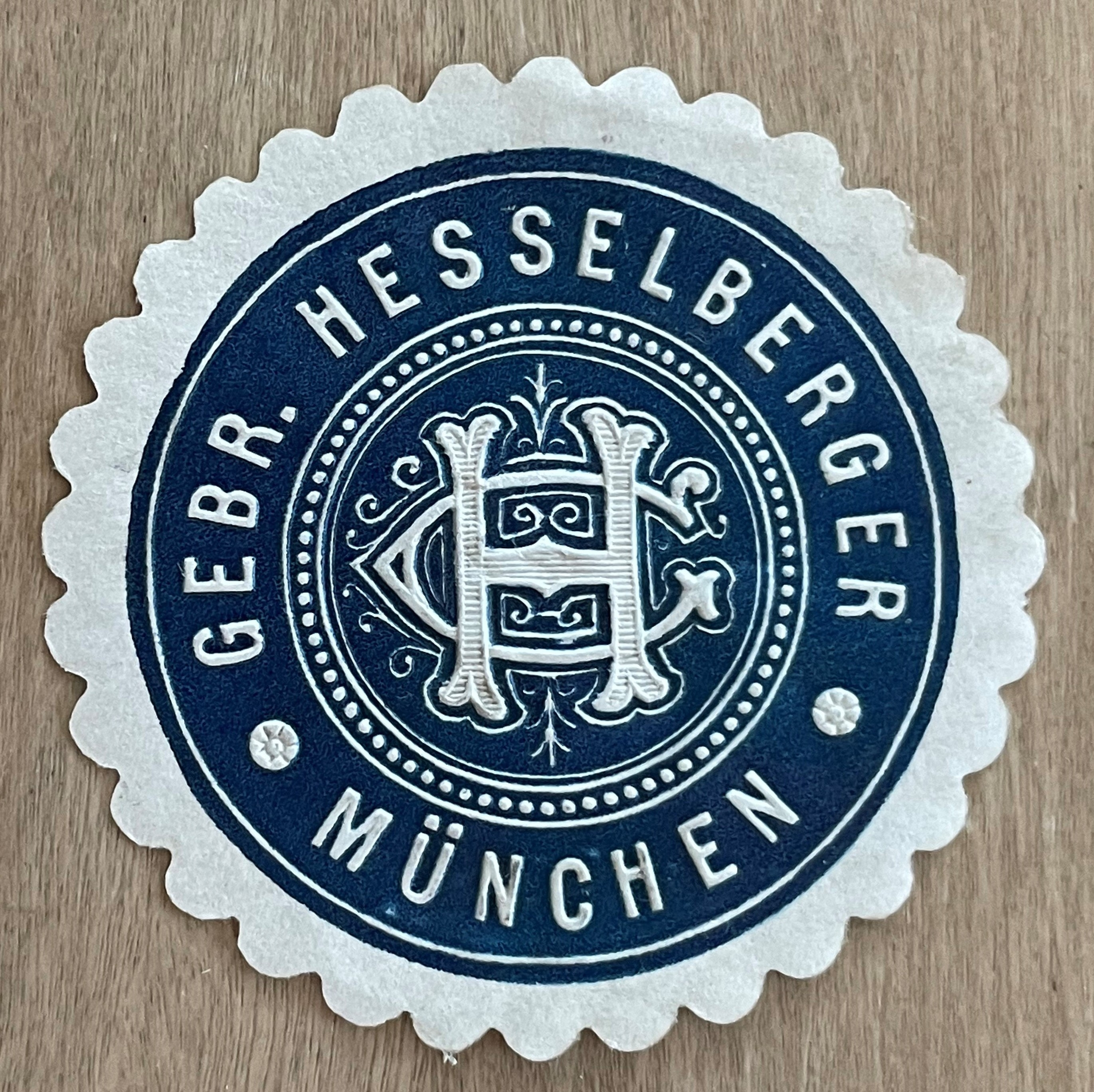
Siegelmarke der Leather factory, Hesselberger Brothers Munich

Franz Hesselberger was the second oldest of the five children (Else, Erich, Stefanie and Dorothea) of the leather goods wholesaler Julius Hesselberger and his wife Berta, née Gutmann. Julius Hesselberger came from an important hop merchant family from Dittenheim, about 30 kilometers east of the Hesselberg in Middle Franconia. On June 22, 1903, he was appointed a Kommerzienrat. Julius and his brother Isador founded the company Gebrüder Hesselberger in Biederstein, a district of Munich's Schwabing neighborhood, in 1869. To the north of the site was Biederstein Castle.

The business dealt in leather and leather goods, importing raw materials, initially from India, and later also from Asia, America and Africa. The Gebrüder Hesselberger company also began tanning and producing leather goods itself in its own factory at Biederstein 7 in Munich (now Isarring 11) in 1889. Extensions were constructed by Heilmann & Littmann. A new administration and canteen building was built in 1917. The factory had the latest leather processing machines, which were driven by a 260 hp steam engine from the MAN company and was capable of processing 60,000 large cattle hides and 30,000 skins annually in the 400 pits. For the approximately 250 workers, there was a canteen, a workers' sick support association, baths and residential buildings. In addition to the tannery, the leather was processed on site.

=== Social Ascent ===
After the death of his uncle Isidor on May 23, 1901, Hesselberger became a partner in the company. When Julius Hesselberger died on March 15, 1904, Franz took over management of the company together with brother Erich and cousin Max Alfons. A court-sworn expert for tanning and red tanning, he also sat on the supervisory board of the shoe factory Silberstein & Neumann AG in Schweinfurt and was a member of the admission board for securities at the Munich stock exchange. The company Gebrüder Hesselberger was one of the founding members of the Munich and Upper Bavaria district association of the Federation of Industrialists.

Franz Hesselberger owned considerable real estate in Munich, including, in addition to the manufacturing site at Biederstein 7, a retail store in the city center at Burgstraße 15, and properties at Brienner Strasse 48 and Osterwaldstrasse 8.

On August 14, 1908, Franz Hesselberger married Ilse Minna Rosa Wertheim (born April 11, 1888) in Frankfurt am Main, a granddaughter of the founder of the German sewing machine factory Joseph Wertheim. The couple moved to the third floor of the Prinz-Georg-Palais at Karolinenplatz 5, rnext to Emil Hirsch's antiquarian bookshop. Franz Hesselberger he leased an estate in 1901 and acquired the overall hunting rights. In September 1910 their son Heinz Julius was born, three years later, on October 13, 1913, their daughter Gertraud, called Trudy, was born. Both children were baptized Protestants, since Ilse Hesselberger had previously converted to the Protestant faith.

On January 7, 1918, he was appointed a Kommerzienrat. The family was engaged in philanthropy. Shortly after the death of his mother, Julius Hesselberger sent 500 Reichsmark in cash to the First Mayor of Munich, Wilhelm Ritter von Borscht, in March 1902, asking him to use the sum "in the spirit of our deceased mother (...) without distinction of denomination (...) for the poor of the city gefl." On the anniversary two years later, the sum of 1000 Reichsmark was again made available to the mayor.

Hesselberger established the Gebrüder Hesselberger Kriegswohlfahrtsstiftung (Hesselberger Brothers War Welfare Foundation), which was endowed with a capital stock of 250,000 Reichsmarks for the purpose of supporting needy war invalids as well as widows and orphans of war victims and donated 6000 Reichsmarks for the naming of a room in the Prinz-Ludwig-Heim. In addition, he founded the Gebrüder Hesselberger Wohlfahrtsstiftung (Hesselberger Brothers Welfare Foundation) to support the employees and officials of their factory. In 1918, he donated 50,000 Reichsmark to the Deutsches Museum, of which he was a committee member. Hesselberger also made a generous donation to the "Chemisches Laboratorium des Staates" (Chemical Laboratory of the State).[23] In addition, he was a member of the Kaiser Wilhelm Society for the Advancement of Science[24] and the Geographical Society of Munich[25]. Together with other local companies as well as the Verein zur Verbesserung der Wohnungsverhältnisse in München e.V. (today: Gemeinnütziger Wohnungsverein München 1899 e.V.), the Gebrüder Hesselberger company founded a non-profit society in 1918 with a capital stock of one million Reichsmark for the construction of workers' housing in the Alte Heide.[26] During World War I, Franz Hesselberger set up a club hospital at Karolinenplatz 5a for 40 to 45 wounded men. Hesselberger was also a member of the "Vereinslazarett".

The workers of the leather factory Gebrüder Hesselberger participated in the munitions workers' strike organized by Kurt Eisner at the end of January 1918.[28] As a large industrialist, Hesselberger was concerned about the threat of violence against himself and his family and in 1919, he brought his children to his mother Berta at his estate "Hirschlehen"[29] in Berchtesgaden and hid in an unknown place. His wife went temporarily to her sister in Frankfurt am Main.[30] The Hesselbergers' apartment on Karolinenplatz was then searched unsuccessfully for weapons by revolutionaries - despite the hunting weapons kept there. In addition, on the night of May 6, 1919, the cellar of the Prinz-Georg-Palais was the scene of a massacre perpetrated by the Freikorps Bayreuth on members of the Catholic journeymen's association St. Joseph.[31] When the situation calmed down a few days later, Hesselberger returned to Munich with his family.

In 1921, Hesselberger was seriously injured in a car accident which killed his passenger, a local master locksmith[32] The Hesselberger family then covered the education costs for his daughter.[33]

=== Rotary Club ===
When the Rotary Club of Munich was founded on November 2, 1928, as the third oldest German club, Franz Hesselberger was among the founding members. Despite his move to Sauerlach, Hesselberger continued to regularly attend Rotary meetings at the Hotel Vier Jahreszeiten. On April 4, 1933, at the instigation of Wilhelm Arendts, he was expelled from the Rotary Club of Munich along with 13 other members, all of whom were Jewish except for Thomas Mann. With a red pen, the names of those expelled were crossed off the attendance list of the weekly Rotary meeting.

== Nazi era ==
When the Nazis came to power in 1933, the Hesselberger family was persecuted because of their Jewish heritage.

Franz Hesselberger died at the age of 59 on July 15, 1935, in the Israelitisches Kranken- und Schwesternheim[38]. He is buried in the Waldfriedhof cemetery in Munich. Soon after his death, the Gebrüder Hesselberger company ceased operations. In the summer of 1936, the Jewish Religious Community applied to set up a "training school for the education of Jewish youth as craftsmen" in the abandoned factory.[39] This served to facilitate the chances of emigration abroad for those willing to leave the country through training in craftsmanship.[40] In 1939, the building was confiscated on the instructions of the Gestapo Headquarters in Munich, and the training workshops were closed.

-Under the Nazis' anti-semitic Nuremberg Laws, Ilse Hesselberger was considered a Jew and persecuted by the Nazis. Ilse Hesselberger moved with her daughter to her villa at Biederstein 7 in October 1937. There she met Curt Mezger, a nephew of Franz Hesselberger.managed to flee to New York City in 1938, however Ilse Hesselberger remained in Munich, where she was forced to sell off her assets under the pressure of the Nazi Christian Weber. The estate in Sauerlach was acquired by Margarethe Ohnesorge, the second wife of Reich Postal Minister Wilhelm Ohnesorge. The Biederstein factory facilities went to the city of Munich on September 16, 1939. SA-Hauptsturmführer Hans Wegner, head of the "Aryanization Office Munich," gave Ilse Hesselberger hope of being spared deportation if she "donated" to the establishment of the Milbertshofen collection camp. Deceived, she transferred over 100,000 Reichsmarks to him on October 10, 1941. On November 20, 1941, she deported from Munich to Kaunas, where she was murdered in the Kauen concentration camp five days after her arrival at the age of 51.[1] A visa that would have enabled her to leave for Cuba, which had been organized by daughter Gertraud, arrived too late.

== Fate of the family members ==
Julius Hesselberger (* December 11, 1847, in Dittenheim) died at the age of 56. He is buried in the Old Jewish Cemetery in Munich, his tomb designed by the sculptor Hermann Hahn. Berta Hesselberger (b. September 26, 1853, in Göppingen) died on August 28, 1920, in Berchtesgaden. Max Alfons Hesselberger, a recipient of the Bavarian Military Order of Merit as well as the Red Cross Medal, died on March 23, 1918. He bequeathed his collection of 110 precious pocket watches to the Bavarian National Museum.

Tomb of Erich Hesselberger at the Waldfriedhof Munich in March 2022.

Else Hesselberger (b. March 1, 1875, in Munich) married Philipp Mezger († April 26, 1912) and died in 1921 at the age of 46. Their son Curt Mezger was arrested as the last head of the Milbertshofen collection and deportation camp on March 14, 1943, and deported to the Auschwitz concentration camp. In January 1945, he was transferred to the Ebensee subcamp in Mauthausen, where he was murdered a month and a half later.

Erich Hesselberger (b. August 13, 1877, in Munich) first served in the 4th Replacement Company of the Royal Bavarian 1st Field Artillery Regiment "Prinzregent Luitpold" from 1915, and was then transferred to the Royal Bavarian Balloon Defense Gun Platoon 117. On March 27, 1916, Erich Hesselberger fell with the rank of lieutenant in Landwehr II on the Côte de Talou, south of Samogneux near Verdun. He left behind his wife Elisabeth, née von Wolfner and two daughters Maria Vera and Marion Ruth. His grave is in the old part of the Waldfriedhof Munich. His name can also be found on the memorial for the Jewish fallen at the New Israeli Cemetery in Schwabing.

Dorothea Hesselberger (* September 16, 1882, in Munich) married on December 4, 1916, in her second marriage, the k.u.k. First Lieutenant Fritz Reiner. Together with her sister-in-law Ilse Hesselberger, Dorothea Reiner was deported to Kaunas on November 20, 1941, and murdered there in the Kauen concentration camp on November 25, 1941.

Stefanie Hesselberger (* 27 October 1887 in Munich) married the Nazi functionary Leo Karl von Bayer-Ehrenberg in her second marriage. Until the beginning of 1942, she lived intermittently on the Murnau-Hochried estate of the philanthropist James Loeb, who died in 1933. She was then officially registered in the Milbertshofen collection camp, but lived with her nephew Curt Mezger in the boarding house of Countess Helene Maria von Harrach, the wife of the sculptor Hans Albrecht von Harrach. Stefanie Hesselberger committed suicide by Veronal in Munich on April 3, 1942, one day before her planned deportation to the Piaski camp.

Heinz Julius Hesselberger went to the Wilhelmsgymnasium Munich in the school year 1920/21,[53] then to the Swiss boarding school Lyceum Alpinum Zuoz, finally lived in Lisbon and, according to official readings, died in a swimming accident in Porto on September 14, 1935, shortly after his 25th birthday.[1] He possibly put an end to his life voluntarily. He is buried in the Waldfriedhof in Munich.

Gertraud "Trudy" Hesselberger (b. October 13, 1913, in Munich) was taken by her mother to Milan and from there flew to Rotterdam, where she boarded a ship for New York City on August 20, 1938.[55] Soon after emigrating, she married Lee Sommer, a childhood friend from Cologne. The marriage remained childless. Gertraud Sommer died in New York City on July 30, 2012.[45]

== Restitution of Nazi-looted art ==
In 2022, Portrait of A Man, Facing Left, With A Quill and a Sheet of Paper, c. 1527 was restituted by German government to the heirs of Isle Hesselberger. Many artworks looted from Hesselberger are still being searched for.
