= Hottingen =

Hottingen may refer to:

- Hottingen, Rickenbach, Rickenbach, Baden-Württemberg, Germany
- Hottingen (Zürich), Canton of Zürich, Switzerland

== See also ==
- Höttingen, a municipality in the Weißenburg-Gunzenhausen district, Bavaria, Germany
