= Burgsalach =

- Municipality
- Coat of arms

- Location of Burgsalach within Weißenburg-Gunzenhausen district
- Interactive map of Burgsalach
- Location within Germany Location within Bavaria
- Coordinates: 49°2′N 11°6′E
- Country: Germany
- State: Bavaria
- Admin. region: Mittelfranken
- District: Weißenburg-Gunzenhausen
- Municipal assoc.: Nennslingen
- Subdivisions: 3 Ortsteile

Government
  - Mayor (2020–26): Volker Satzinger

Area
  - Total: 19.31 km^{2} (7.46 sq mi)
- Elevation: 583 m (1,913 ft)

Population (2025-12-31)
  - Total: 1,141
  - Density: 59.09/km^{2} (153.0/sq mi)
- Time zone: UTC+01:00 (CET)
  - Summer (DST): UTC+02:00 (CEST)
- Postal codes: 91790
- Dialling codes: 09147
- Vehicle registration: WUG
- Website: www.nennslingen.de

Burgsalach is a municipality in the Weißenburg-Gunzenhausen district in Bavaria, Germany.
