= Altmühltal =

- Verwaltungsgemeinschaft
- Location of Altmühltal within Weißenburg-Gunzenhausen district
- Interactive map of Altmühltal
- Location within Germany Location within Bavaria
- Coordinates: 49°02′N 10°49′E
- Country: Germany
- State: Bavaria
- Admin. region: Middle Franconia
- District: Weißenburg-Gunzenhausen
- Seat: Meinheim
- Subdivisions: 4 municipalities

Area
  - Total: 80.69 km^{2} (31.15 sq mi)

Population (2025-12-31)
  - Total: 4,934
  - Density: 61.15/km^{2} (158.4/sq mi)
- Time zone: UTC+01:00 (CET)
  - Summer (DST): UTC+02:00 (CEST)
- Website: vgem-altmuehltal.de

Altmühltal (lit.: "Altmühl valley") is a Verwaltungsgemeinschaft (federation of municipalities) in the district of Weißenburg-Gunzenhausen in Bavaria in Germany. The seat of the Verwaltungsgemeinschaft is in Meinheim.

It consists of the following municipalities:

- Alesheim
- Dittenheim
- Markt Berolzheim
- Meinheim
