= Weißenburg-Gunzenhausen =

Coordinates: 49°05′N 10°50′E

- District
- Flag Coat of arms
- Country: Germany
- State: Bavaria
- Adm. region: Middle Franconia
- Capital: Weißenburg

Government
  - District admin.: Manuel Westphal (CSU)

Area
  - Total: 970.83 km^{2} (374.84 sq mi)

Population (31 December 2025)
  - Total: 94,407
  - Density: 97.244/km^{2} (251.86/sq mi)
- Time zone: UTC+01:00 (CET)
  - Summer (DST): UTC+02:00 (CEST)
- Vehicle registration: GUN, WUG
- Website: landkreis-wug.de

Weißenburg-Gunzenhausen (German pronunciation: [ˈvaɪsn̩ˌbʊʁk ɡʊntsn̩ˈhaʊzn̩]) is a Landkreis (district) in the west of Bavaria, Germany with a population of 95,000. Neighbouring districts are (from the north clockwise) Ansbach, Roth, Eichstätt and Donau-Ries. It is located in the south of Middle Franconia, 50 kilometres south of Nuremberg. Largest city and the administrative center is Weißenburg in Bayern.

== Geography ==
The district is located on the Hahnenkamm and on the Franconian Alb in the North of the Altmühltal. In the north there are several lakes of the Franconian Lake District. The highest point of the district is the Dürrenberg. The Altmühl flows through the district. From here comes the Solnhofen limestone. Among its nature reserves is the Brombachmoor.

== History ==
The district was formed in 1972 by a merger of the districts of Gunzenhausen, Weißenburg, and the previously independent urban district of Weißenburg.

== Coat of arms ==
The coat of arms of the district is divided into three fields: left, right and bottom. The bottom of the coat of arms (silver kettle hats on blue) derives from the Counts of Pappenheim, and was taken from the coat of arms of the former district Weißenburg. The half eagle (black on yellow) in the right stands for the city of Weißenburg, and the red-yellow horizontal bars in the left are taken from the coat of arms of the former district Gunzenhausen.

== Towns and municipalities ==
Clickable map of towns and municipalities in the district

Towns
1. Gunzenhausen
2. Pappenheim
3. Treuchtlingen
4. Weißenburg in Bayern
Märkte
1. Pleinfeld
Municipalities
1. Langenaltheim
2. Muhr am See
3. Polsingen
4. Solnhofen

Verwaltungsgemeinschaften
1. Altmühltal; 1. Alesheim; 2. Dittenheim; 3. Markt Berolzheim^{3}; 4. Meinheim^{1}	2. Ellingen; 1. Ellingen^{1,2}; 2. Ettenstatt; 3. Höttingen	3. Gunzenhausen; 1. Absberg^{3}; 2. Haundorf; 3. Pfofeld; 4. Theilenhofen	4. Hahnenkamm; 1. Gnotzheim^{3}; 2. Heidenheim^{1,3}; 3. Westheim	5. Nennslingen; 1. Bergen; 2. Burgsalach; 3. Nennslingen^{1,3}; 4. Raitenbuch
^{1}seat of the Verwaltungsgemeinschaft; ^{2}town; ^{3}Markt

== Sights ==
- Gelbe Burg, a mountain and site of an old hill castle.
- Ellinger Tor, a city gate in Weißenburg in Bayern.
- Wülzburg, a fortress.
- Bürgermeister-Müller-Museum in Solnhofen
- Ellingen Residence
- Fossa Carolina
