= Haundorf =

- Municipality
- Coat of arms

- Location of Haundorf within Weißenburg-Gunzenhausen district
- Interactive map of Haundorf
- Location within Germany Location within Bavaria
- Coordinates: 49°11′N 10°46′E
- Country: Germany
- State: Bavaria
- Admin. region: Mittelfranken
- District: Weißenburg-Gunzenhausen
- Municipal assoc.: Gunzenhausen
- Subdivisions: 4 Ortsteile

Government
  - Mayor (2020–26): Christian Beierlein

Area
  - Total: 51.34 km^{2} (19.82 sq mi)
- Elevation: 440–530 m (1,440–1,740 ft)

Population (2025-12-31)
  - Total: 2,740
  - Density: 53.4/km^{2} (138/sq mi)
- Time zone: UTC+01:00 (CET)
  - Summer (DST): UTC+02:00 (CEST)
- Postal codes: 91729
- Dialling codes: 09837
- Vehicle registration: WUG, GUN
- Website: www.haundorf.de

Haundorf is a municipality in the Weißenburg-Gunzenhausen district, in Bavaria, Germany.

On the southeastern edge of the municipality is the Brombachmoor nature reserve.
