= Ellingen (Verwaltungsgemeinschaft) =

- Verwaltungsgemeinschaft
- Location of Ellingen within Weißenburg-Gunzenhausen district
- Interactive map of Ellingen
- Location within Germany Location within Bavaria
- Coordinates: 49°04′N 10°58′E
- Country: Germany
- State: Bavaria
- Admin. region: Middle Franconia
- District: Weißenburg-Gunzenhausen
- Seat: Ellingen
- Subdivisions: 3 municipalities

Area
  - Total: 66.35 km^{2} (25.62 sq mi)

Population (2025-12-31)
  - Total: 5,887
  - Density: 88.73/km^{2} (229.8/sq mi)
- Time zone: UTC+01:00 (CET)
  - Summer (DST): UTC+02:00 (CEST)
- Website: www.vgem-ellingen.de

Ellingen is a Verwaltungsgemeinschaft (federation of municipalities) in the district of Weißenburg-Gunzenhausen in Bavaria in Germany. The seat of the Verwaltungsgemeinschaft is in Ellingen.

It consists of the following municipalities:

1. Ellingen
2. Ettenstatt
3. Höttingen
