= Markt Berolzheim =

- Municipality
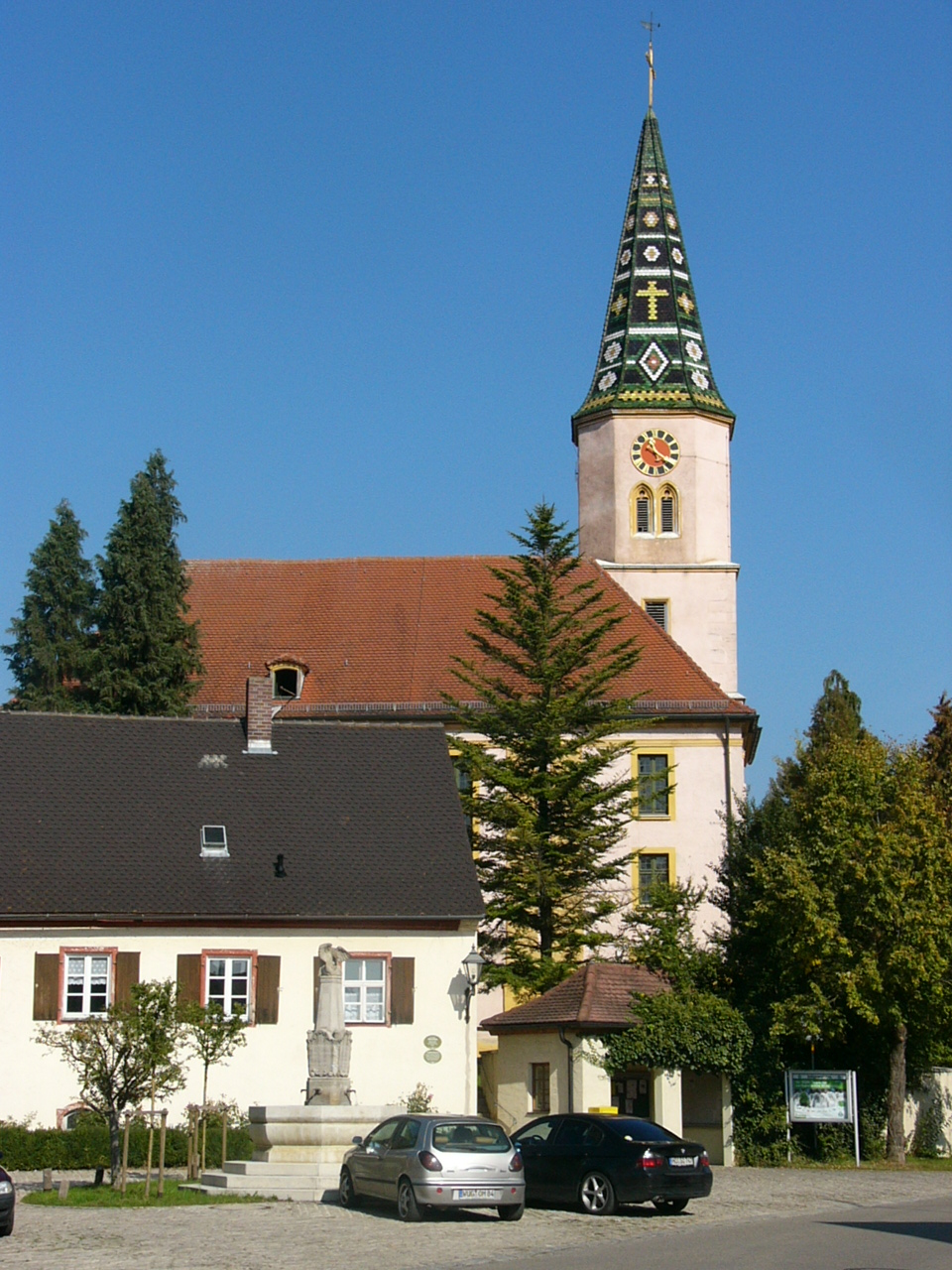
- St. Michael's church

- Coat of arms

- Location of Markt Berolzheim within Weißenburg-Gunzenhausen district
- Interactive map of Markt Berolzheim
- Location within Germany Location within Bavaria
- Coordinates: 49°1′N 10°51′E
- Country: Germany
- State: Bavaria
- Admin. region: Middle Franconia
- District: Weißenburg-Gunzenhausen
- Municipal assoc.: Altmühltal

Government
  - Mayor (2020–26): Fritz Hörner (Greens)

Area
  - Total: 14.52 km^{2} (5.61 sq mi)
- Elevation: 424 m (1,391 ft)

Population (2025-12-31)
  - Total: 1,259
  - Density: 86.71/km^{2} (224.6/sq mi)
- Time zone: UTC+01:00 (CET)
  - Summer (DST): UTC+02:00 (CEST)
- Postal codes: 91801
- Dialling codes: 09146
- Vehicle registration: WUG
- Website: www.marktberolzheim.de

Markt Berolzheim is a municipality in the Weißenburg-Gunzenhausen district in Bavaria, Germany.
