= Rohrach (Wörnitz) =

River of Bavaria

- The Rohrach at Polsingen

Location
- Country: Germany
- State: Bavaria

Physical characteristics
- Mouth
  - location: Wörnitz
  - coordinates: 48.8964°N 10.6183°E
- Length: 24.1 km (15.0 mi)

Basin features
- Progression: Wörnitz→ Danube→ Black Sea

Rohrach is a river of Bavaria, Germany. It is a left tributary of the Wörnitz.

== See also ==
- List of rivers of Bavaria
