= Wilhelm Uebler =

German shot putter

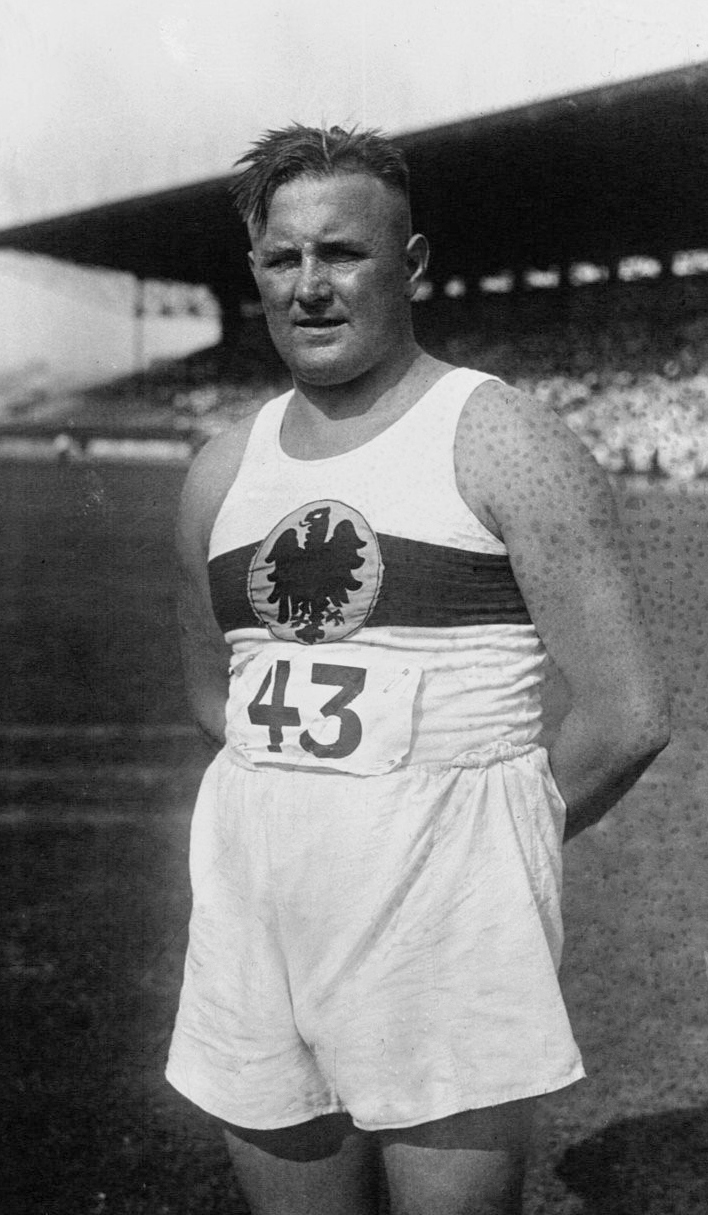
- Wilhelm Uebler in 1929

Personal information
- Born: 28 February 1899 Pleinfeld, Germany
- Died: 13 February 1968 (aged 68) Fürth, Germany

Sport
- Sport: Athletics
- Event: Shot put
- Club: TV 1860 Fürth

Achievements and titles
- Personal best: 15.61 m (1929)

Wilhelm Uebler (28 February 1899 – 13 February 1968) was a German shot putter. He competed at the 1928 Summer Olympics and finished in sixth place.
