= Nennslingen (Verwaltungsgemeinschaft) =

- Verwaltungsgemeinschaft
- Location of Nennslingen within Weißenburg-Gunzenhausen district
- Interactive map of Nennslingen
- Location within Germany Location within Bavaria
- Coordinates: 49°03′N 11°08′E
- Country: Germany
- State: Bavaria
- Admin. region: Middle Franconia
- District: Weißenburg-Gunzenhausen
- Seat: Nennslingen
- Subdivisions: 4 municipalities

Area
  - Total: 99.36 km^{2} (38.36 sq mi)

Population (2025-12-31)
  - Total: 4,932
  - Density: 49.64/km^{2} (128.6/sq mi)
- Time zone: UTC+01:00 (CET)
  - Summer (DST): UTC+02:00 (CEST)
- Website: www.vg-nennslingen.de

Nennslingen is a Verwaltungsgemeinschaft (federation of municipalities) in the district of Weißenburg-Gunzenhausen in Bavaria in Germany. The seat of the Verwaltungsgemeinschaft is in Nennslingen.

It consists of the following municipalities:

1. Bergen
2. Burgsalach
3. Nennslingen
4. Raitenbuch
