= Nennslingen =

- Municipality
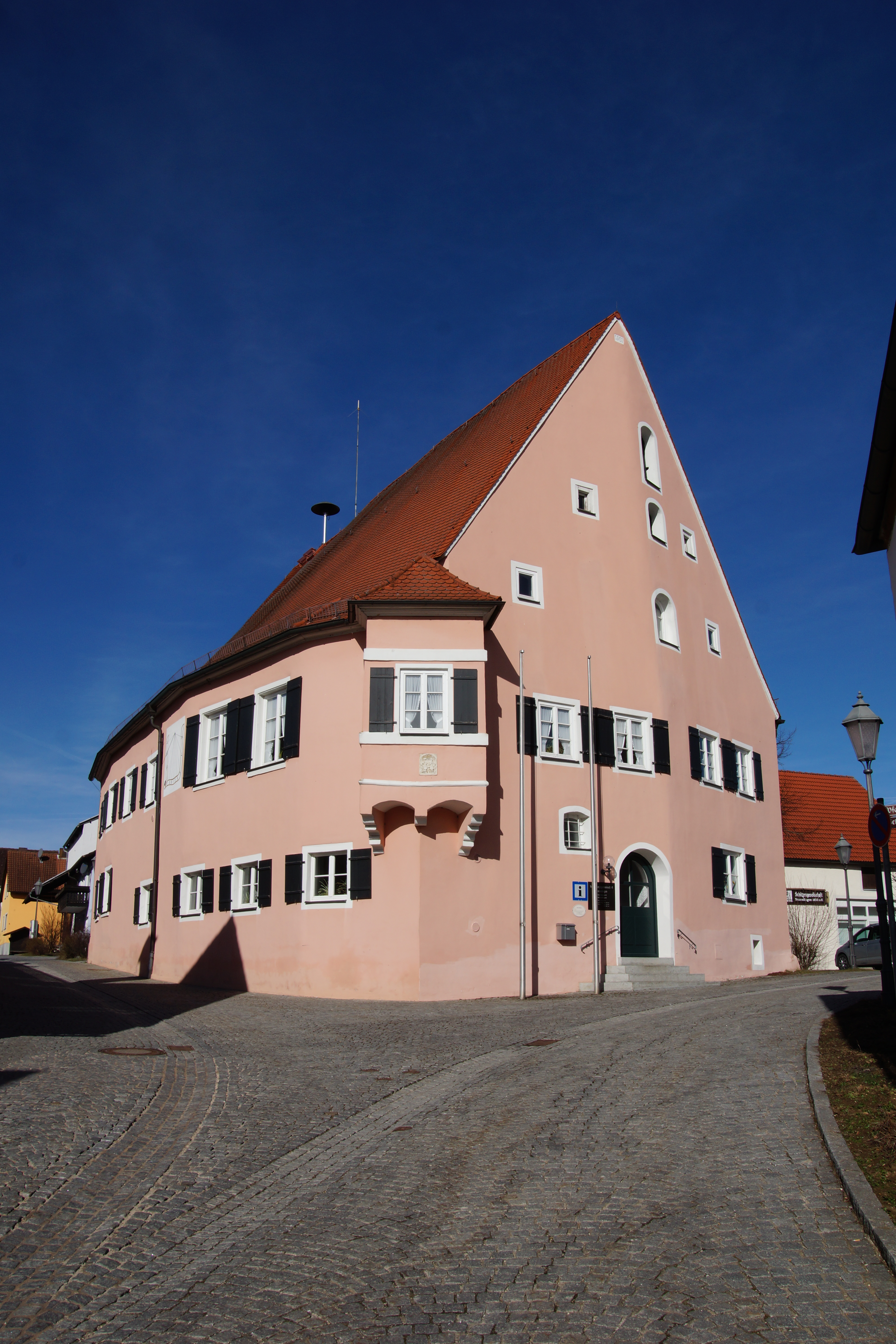
- Town hall

- Coat of arms

- Location of Nennslingen within Weißenburg-Gunzenhausen district
- Interactive map of Nennslingen
- Location within Germany Location within Bavaria
- Coordinates: 49°3′N 11°8′E
- Country: Germany
- State: Bavaria
- Admin. region: Mittelfranken
- District: Weißenburg-Gunzenhausen
- Municipal assoc.: Nennslingen
- Subdivisions: 4 Ortsteile

Government
  - Mayor (2020–26): Bernd Drescher

Area
  - Total: 21.97 km^{2} (8.48 sq mi)
- Elevation: 523 m (1,716 ft)

Population (2025-12-31)
  - Total: 1,429
  - Density: 65.04/km^{2} (168.5/sq mi)
- Time zone: UTC+01:00 (CET)
  - Summer (DST): UTC+02:00 (CEST)
- Postal codes: 91790
- Dialling codes: 09147
- Vehicle registration: WUG
- Website: www.nennslingen.de

Nennslingen is a municipality in the Weißenburg-Gunzenhausen district, in Bavaria, Germany.
