= Raitenbuch =

- Municipality
- Coat of arms

- Location of Raitenbuch within Weißenburg-Gunzenhausen district
- Interactive map of Raitenbuch
- Location within Germany Location within Bavaria
- Coordinates: 49°1′N 11°8′E
- Country: Germany
- State: Bavaria
- Admin. region: Mittelfranken
- District: Weißenburg-Gunzenhausen
- Municipal assoc.: Nennslingen
- Subdivisions: 5 Ortsteile

Government
  - Mayor (2020–26): Joachim Wegerer

Area
  - Total: 38.20 km^{2} (14.75 sq mi)
- Elevation: 559 m (1,834 ft)

Population (2025-12-31)
  - Total: 1,215
  - Density: 31.81/km^{2} (82.38/sq mi)
- Time zone: UTC+01:00 (CET)
  - Summer (DST): UTC+02:00 (CEST)
- Postal codes: 91790
- Dialling codes: 09147
- Vehicle registration: WUG
- Website: www.raitenbuch.de

Raitenbuch is a municipality in the Weißenburg-Gunzenhausen district, in Bavaria, Germany.
