= Polsingen =

- Municipality
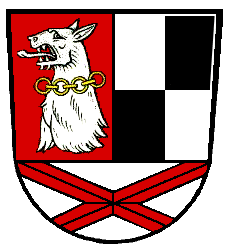
- Coat of arms

- Location of Polsingen within Weißenburg-Gunzenhausen district
- Interactive map of Polsingen
- Location within Germany Location within Bavaria
- Coordinates: 48°56′N 10°43′E
- Country: Germany
- State: Bavaria
- Admin. region: Mittelfranken
- District: Weißenburg-Gunzenhausen
- Subdivisions: 4 Ortsteile

Government
  - Mayor (2020–26): Heinz Meyer

Area
  - Total: 33.87 km^{2} (13.08 sq mi)
- Elevation: 443 m (1,453 ft)

Population (2025-12-31)
  - Total: 1,779
  - Density: 52.52/km^{2} (136.0/sq mi)
- Time zone: UTC+01:00 (CET)
  - Summer (DST): UTC+02:00 (CEST)
- Postal codes: 91805
- Dialling codes: 09093
- Vehicle registration: WUG
- Website: www.polsingen.de

Polsingen is a municipality in the Weißenburg-Gunzenhausen district, in Bavaria, Germany.
