= Hahnenkamm (Altmühl valley) =

Mountain chain in Germany

Coordinates: 49°00′56″N 10°45′45″E

Highest point
- Elevation: 656.4 m (2,154 ft)

Geography
- Location: Bavaria, Germany

The Hahnenkamm is a mountain ridge in Bavaria (Germany), belonging to the Franconian Jura.

== Etymology ==
The German word Hahnenkamm literally translates to "rooster's comb". Local historian Martin Winter suggested the name derives from the topography of the ridge, resembling the respective body part of the animal. Wilhelm Kraft assumed a relationship with a homonymous piece of land close to the village of Rehlingen from where the name spread to refer to the whole area over time. Others argued the name relates to Hain ("grove"), originally spelled as Haynenkamm or Haynenkamp in old German, which would translate as "wooded mountain ridge". Lastly, some researchers interpreted its name as Hunnenkamp or Campus hunorum (Latin for "battlefield of the Huns") in relation to regional folk tales involving Attila the Hun.

== Geography ==
The Hahnenkamm is located at the southwestern border of the Franconian Jura with the foothills extending in northwestern direction. On its eastern side, it is bordered by the Altmühl valley, on the western side by the Ries impact crater and Wörnitz valley. Two streams, Westliche Rohrach and Östliche Rochrach, run through the region with the first one supplying the artificial lake Hahnenkammsee. Highest point of the Hahnenkamm and the Franconian Jura as a whole is the Dürrenberg. The largest municipality is Treuchtlingen.

== Geology ==
As for other parts of the Jura Mountains, the Hahnenkamm mostly consists of Jurassic-aged sedimentary rocks, which were deposited in the former Tethys sea. Additionally, patchy deposits of ejecta named Bunte Trümmermassen ("coloured breccia") occur, originating from the proximate Ries impact. In several springs at the mountain slopes, tufa is precipitated, forming aqueduct-like channels called Steinerne Rinnen ("lithic channels"). Rarely occurring sedimentary quartzites are probably Cretaceous in age.

== Tourism ==
The lake Hahnenkammsee was officially dedicated in 1977, it is part of the Franconian Lake District. Proximate to the lake is a large area open to enduro motorcycles. Several medieval buildings and archeological sites of past fortifications can be found in the region.

Parts of the Hahnenkamm region are protected as nature reserve, geotopes or protected landscape.

== See also ==
Verwaltungsgemeinschaft Hahnenkamm
