= Schwarzach (Altmühl) =

River in Germany

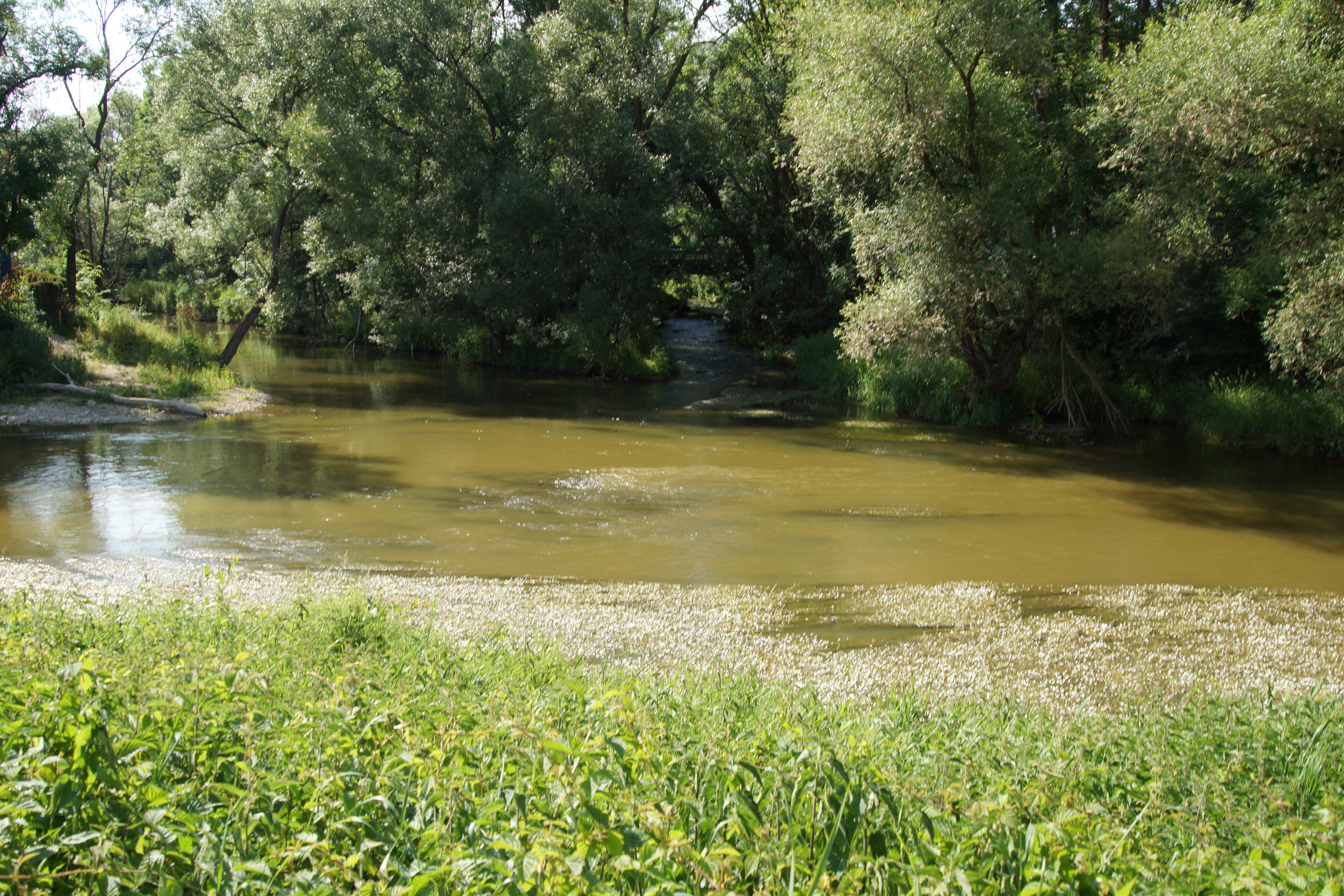
- discharge of the two Schwarzach arms into the Altmühl

Location
- Country: Germany
- State: Bavaria

Physical characteristics
- Mouth
  - location: Altmühl
  - coordinates: 48.9992°N 11.3874°E
- Length: 52.9 km (32.9 mi)
- Basin size: 510 km^{2} (200 sq mi)

Basin features
- Progression: Altmühl→ Danube→ Black Sea

Schwarzach (German pronunciation: [ˈʃvaʁtsax]) is a river of Bavaria, Germany. It is a left tributary of the Altmühl at Kinding.

== See also ==
- List of rivers of Bavaria
