= Meinheim =

- Municipality
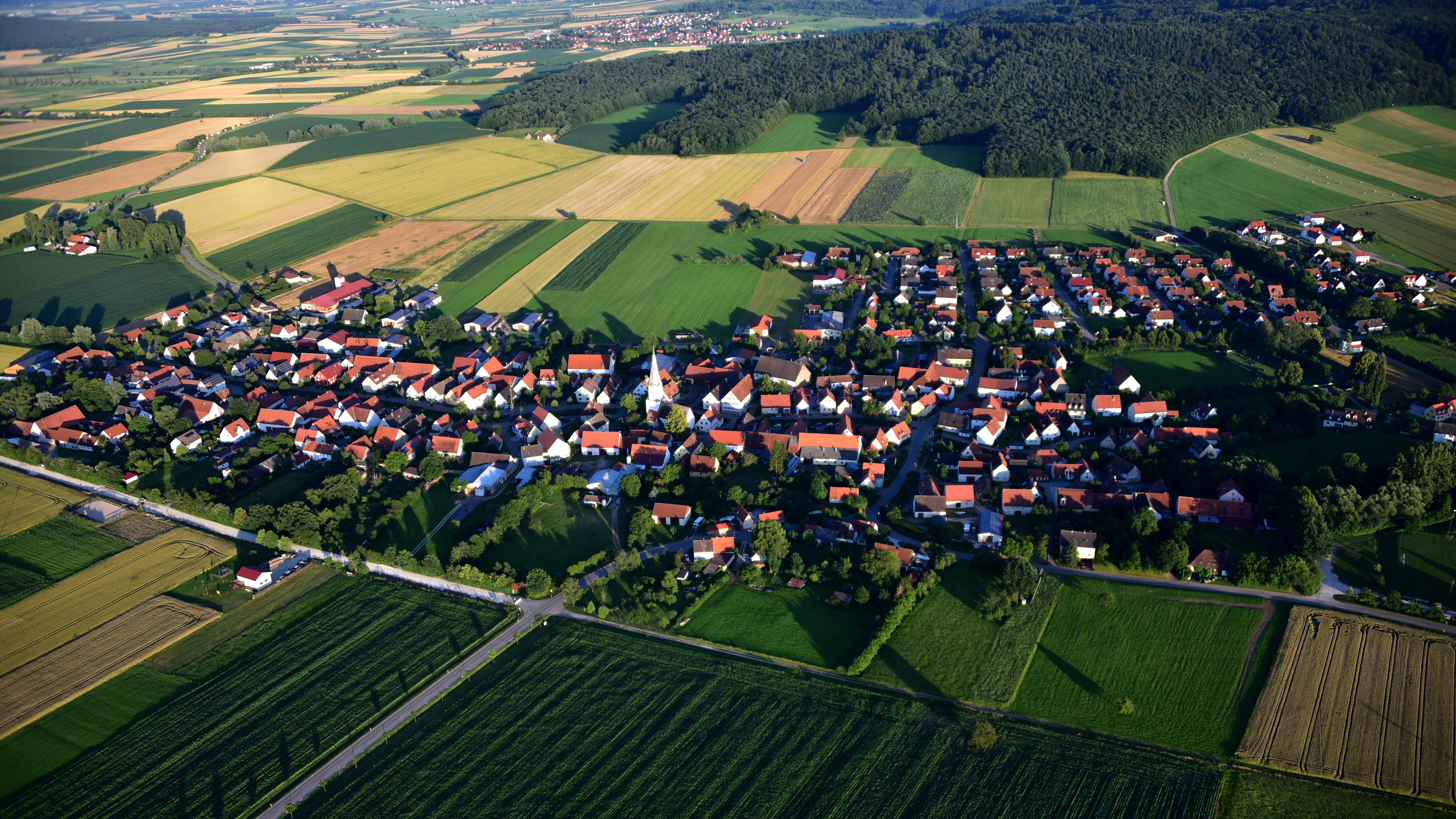
- Aerial view

- Coat of arms

- Location of Meinheim within Weißenburg-Gunzenhausen district
- Interactive map of Meinheim
- Location within Germany Location within Bavaria
- Coordinates: 49°2′N 10°49′E
- Country: Germany
- State: Bavaria
- Admin. region: Mittelfranken
- District: Weißenburg-Gunzenhausen
- Municipal assoc.: Altmühltal

Government
  - Mayor (2020–26): Wilfried Cramer

Area
  - Total: 16.36 km^{2} (6.32 sq mi)
- Elevation: 433 m (1,421 ft)

Population (2025-12-31)
  - Total: 840
  - Density: 51/km^{2} (130/sq mi)
- Time zone: UTC+01:00 (CET)
  - Summer (DST): UTC+02:00 (CEST)
- Postal codes: 91802
- Dialling codes: 09146
- Vehicle registration: WUG

Meinheim is a municipality in the Weißenburg-Gunzenhausen district, in Bavaria, Germany.
