= Gnotzheim =

- Municipality
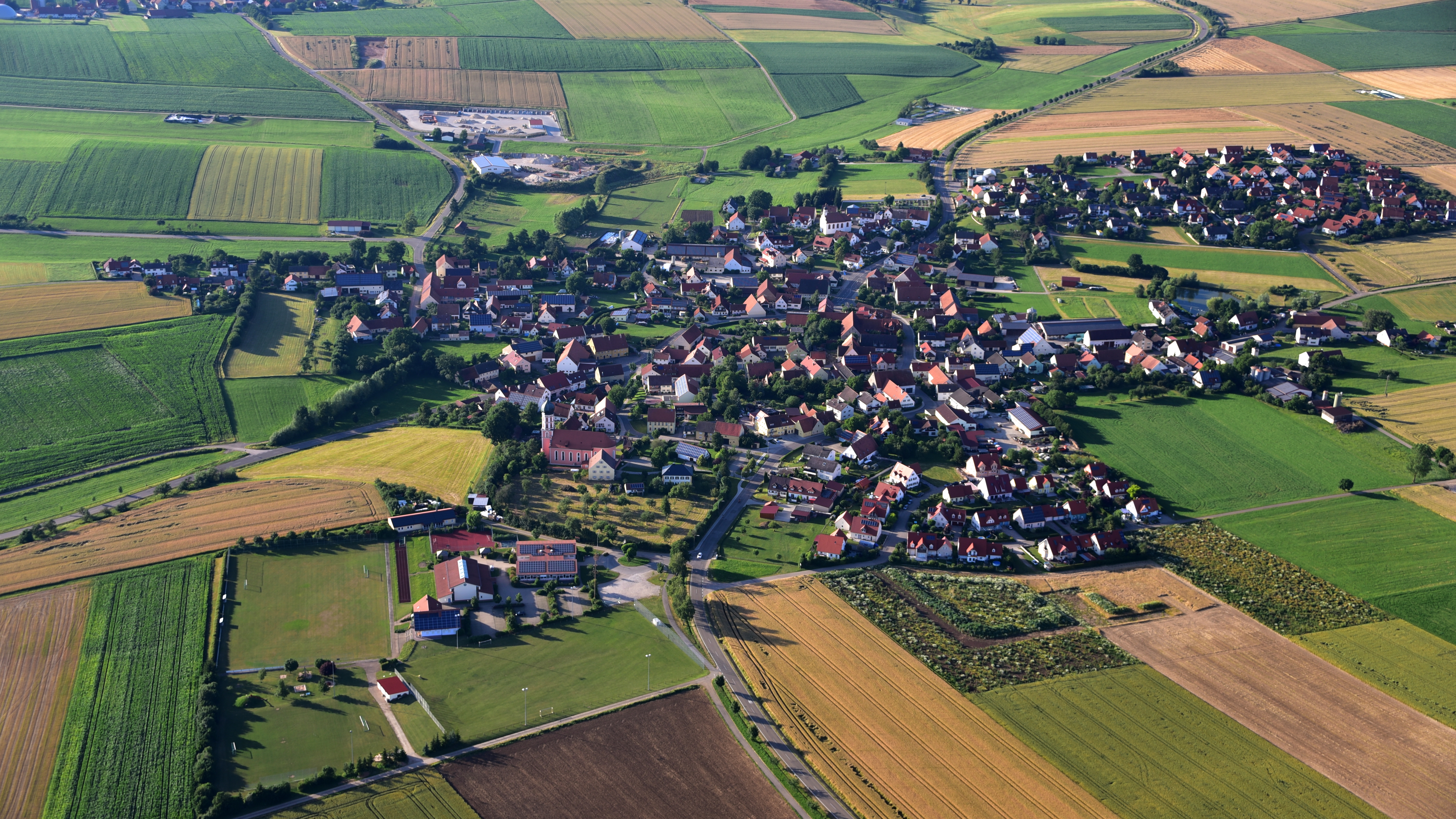
- Aerial view

- Coat of arms

- Location of Gnotzheim within Weißenburg-Gunzenhausen district
- Interactive map of Gnotzheim
- Location within Germany Location within Bavaria
- Coordinates: 49°4′N 10°43′E
- Country: Germany
- State: Bavaria
- Admin. region: Mittelfranken
- District: Weißenburg-Gunzenhausen
- Municipal assoc.: Hahnenkamm
- Subdivisions: 2 Ortsteile

Government
  - Mayor (2020–26): Jürgen Pawlicki

Area
  - Total: 12.48 km^{2} (4.82 sq mi)
- Elevation: 473 m (1,552 ft)

Population (2025-12-31)
  - Total: 805
  - Density: 64.5/km^{2} (167/sq mi)
- Time zone: UTC+01:00 (CET)
  - Summer (DST): UTC+02:00 (CEST)
- Postal codes: 91728
- Dialling codes: 09833
- Vehicle registration: WUG & GUN
- Website: www.gnotzheim.de

Gnotzheim is a municipality in the Weißenburg-Gunzenhausen district, in Bavaria, Germany.
