= Westheim =

- Municipality
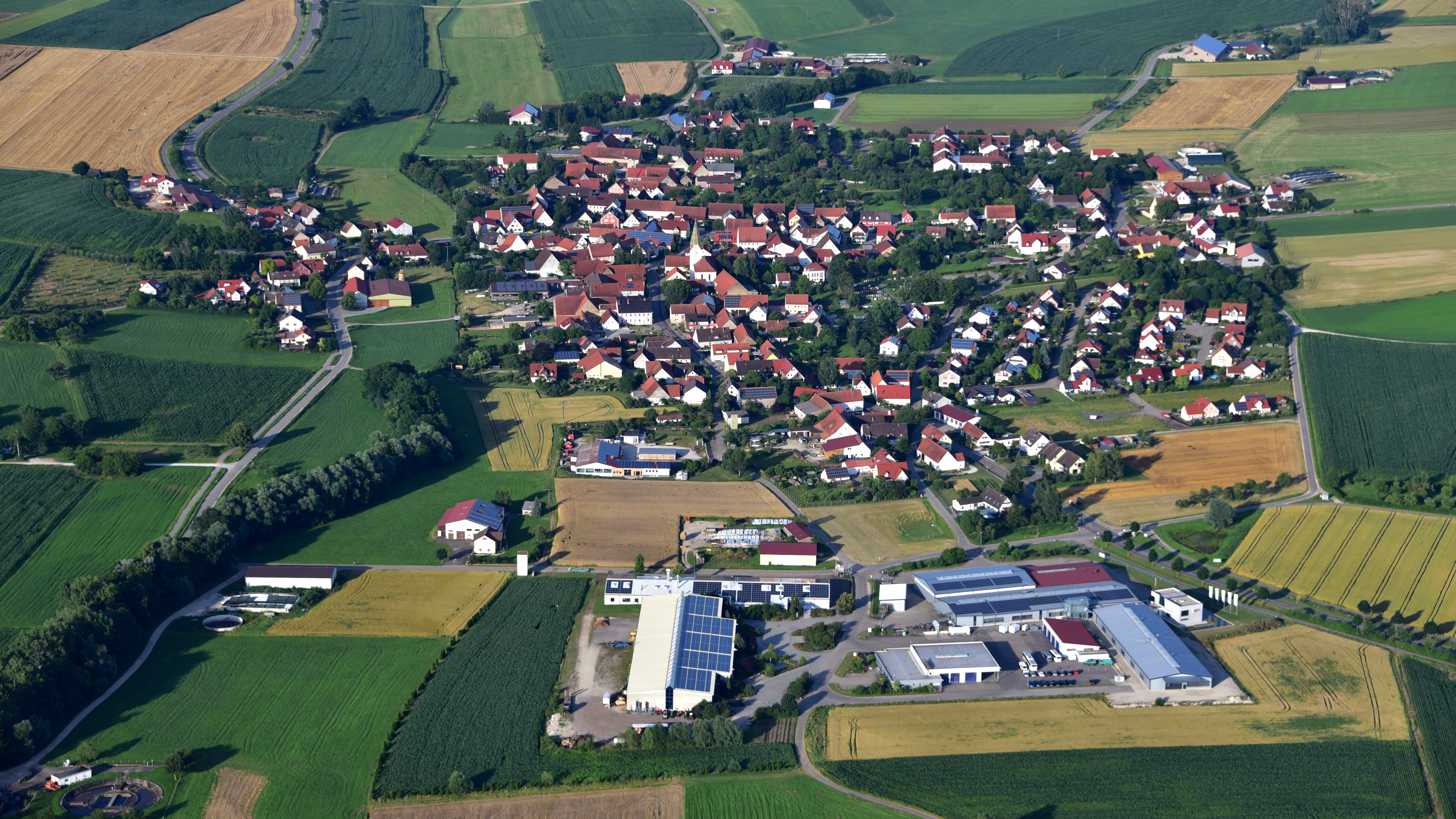
- Aerial view

- Coat of arms

- Location of Westheim within Weißenburg-Gunzenhausen district
- Interactive map of Westheim
- Location within Germany Location within Bavaria
- Coordinates: 49°0′N 10°40′E
- Country: Germany
- State: Bavaria
- Admin. region: Mittelfranken
- District: Weißenburg-Gunzenhausen
- Municipal assoc.: Hahnenkamm

Government
  - Mayor (2020–26): Herbert Weigel

Area
  - Total: 28.32 km^{2} (10.93 sq mi)
- Elevation: 439 m (1,440 ft)

Population (2025-12-31)
  - Total: 1,171
  - Density: 41.35/km^{2} (107.1/sq mi)
- Time zone: UTC+01:00 (CET)
  - Summer (DST): UTC+02:00 (CEST)
- Postal codes: 91747
- Dialling codes: 09082
- Vehicle registration: WUG
- Website: www.westheim.info

Westheim (German pronunciation: [ˈvɛsthaɪm]) is a municipality in the Weißenburg-Gunzenhausen district, in Bavaria, Germany.
