= Bergen, Middle Franconia =

Bergen
- Municipality
- Coat of arms

- Location of Bergen within Weißenburg-Gunzenhausen district
- Interactive map of Bergen
- Location within Germany Location within Bavaria
- Coordinates: 49°5′N 11°7′E
- Country: Germany
- State: Bavaria
- Admin. region: Mittelfranken
- District: Weißenburg-Gunzenhausen
- Municipal assoc.: Nennslingen
- Subdivisions: 5 Ortsteile

Government
  - Mayor (2018–24): Walter Gloßner

Area
  - Total: 19.92 km^{2} (7.69 sq mi)
- Elevation: 539 m (1,768 ft)

Population (2025-12-31)
  - Total: 1,147
  - Density: 57.58/km^{2} (149.1/sq mi)
- Time zone: UTC+01:00 (CET)
  - Summer (DST): UTC+02:00 (CEST)
- Postal codes: 91790
- Dialling codes: 09147 / 09148
- Vehicle registration: WUG
- Website: www.bergen-mittelfranken.de

Bergen (German pronunciation: [ˈbɛʁɡn̩]) is a municipality in the Weißenburg-Gunzenhausen district, in Bavaria, Germany.
