= Höttingen =

- Municipality
- Coat of arms

- Location of Höttingen within Weißenburg-Gunzenhausen district
- Interactive map of Höttingen
- Location within Germany Location within Bavaria
- Coordinates: 49°4′N 11°1′E
- Country: Germany
- State: Bavaria
- Admin. region: Mittelfranken
- District: Weißenburg-Gunzenhausen
- Municipal assoc.: Ellingen
- Subdivisions: 3 Ortsteile

Government
  - Mayor (2020–26): Hans Seibold

Area
  - Total: 19.26 km^{2} (7.44 sq mi)
- Elevation: 430 m (1,410 ft)

Population (2025-12-31)
  - Total: 1,078
  - Density: 55.97/km^{2} (145.0/sq mi)
- Time zone: UTC+01:00 (CET)
  - Summer (DST): UTC+02:00 (CEST)
- Postal codes: 91798
- Dialling codes: 09141
- Vehicle registration: WUG
- Website: www.hoettingen.de

Höttingen (German pronunciation: [ˈhœtɪŋən]) is a municipality in the Weißenburg-Gunzenhausen district, in Bavaria, Germany.
