= Dittenheim =

- Municipality
- Coat of arms

- Location of Dittenheim within Weißenburg-Gunzenhausen district
- Interactive map of Dittenheim
- Location within Germany Location within Bavaria
- Coordinates: 49°3′N 10°48′E
- Country: Germany
- State: Bavaria
- Admin. region: Mittelfranken
- District: Weißenburg-Gunzenhausen
- Municipal assoc.: Altmühltal
- Subdivisions: 4 Ortsteile

Government
  - Mayor (2020–26): Günter Ströbel

Area
  - Total: 29.33 km^{2} (11.32 sq mi)
- Elevation: 437 m (1,434 ft)

Population (2025-12-31)
  - Total: 1,873
  - Density: 63.86/km^{2} (165.4/sq mi)
- Time zone: UTC+01:00 (CET)
  - Summer (DST): UTC+02:00 (CEST)
- Postal codes: 91723
- Dialling codes: 09834
- Vehicle registration: WUG
- Website: www.dittenheim.de

Dittenheim (German pronunciation: [ˈdɪtn̩haɪm]) is a municipality in the Weißenburg-Gunzenhausen district, in Bavaria, Germany.
