= Ellingen =

Place in Bavaria, Germany

- Town
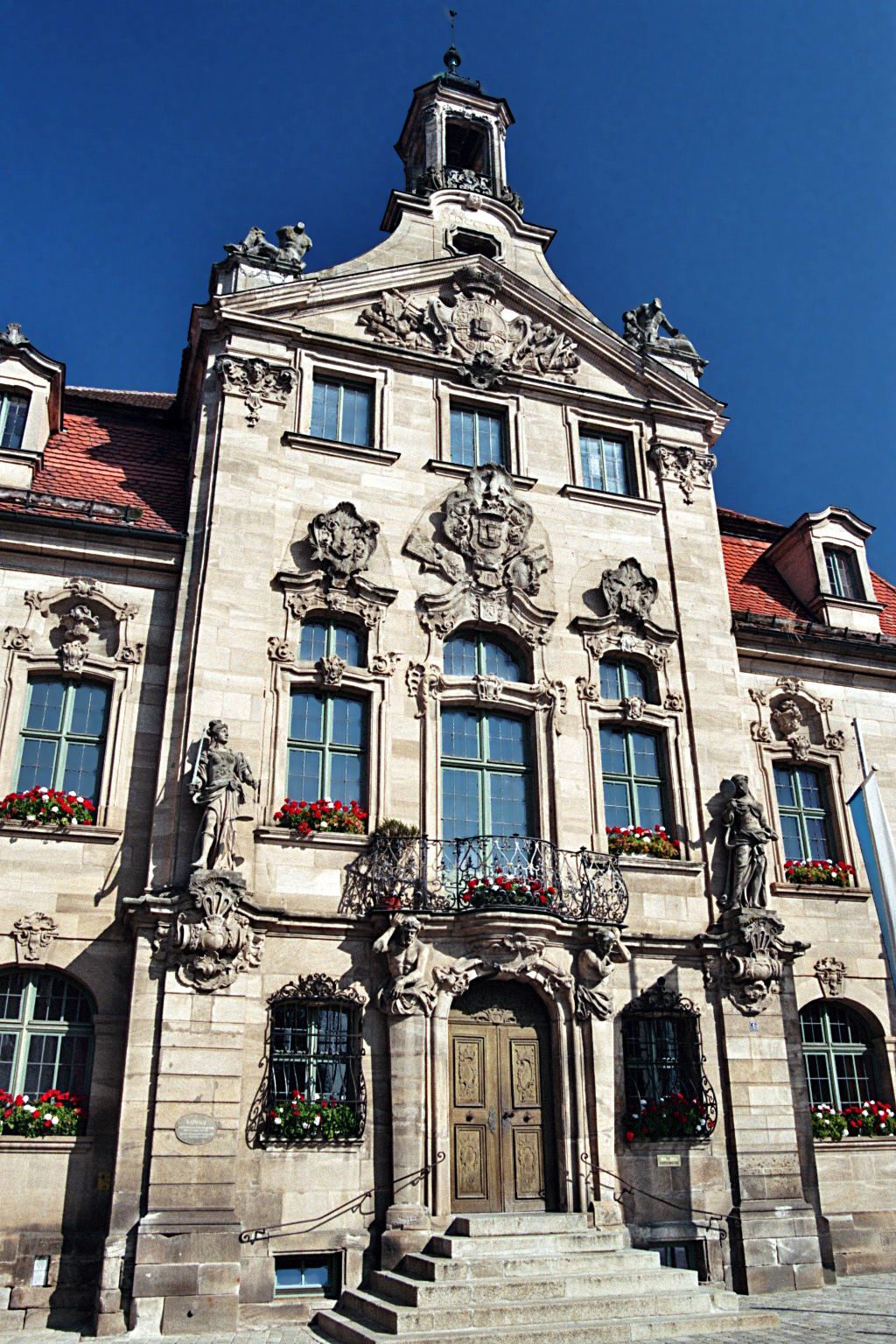
- Town hall

- Coat of arms

- Location of Ellingen within Weißenburg-Gunzenhausen district
- Interactive map of Ellingen
- Location within Germany Location within Bavaria
- Coordinates: 49°01′N 10°58′E
- Country: Germany
- State: Bavaria
- Admin. region: Mittelfranken
- District: Weißenburg-Gunzenhausen
- Municipal assoc.: Ellingen
- Subdivisions: 7 Ortsteile

Government
  - Mayor (2020–26): Matthias Obernöder (CSU)

Area
  - Total: 31.25 km^{2} (12.07 sq mi)
- Elevation: 394–461 m (1,293–1,512 ft)

Population (2025-12-31)
  - Total: 3,923
  - Density: 125.5/km^{2} (325.1/sq mi)
- Time zone: UTC+01:00 (CET)
  - Summer (DST): UTC+02:00 (CEST)
- Postal codes: 91792
- Dialling codes: 09141
- Vehicle registration: WUG
- Website: www.ellingen.de

Ellingen (German pronunciation: [ˈɛlɪŋən]) is a town in the Weißenburg-Gunzenhausen district, in Bavaria, Germany.

== History ==
It was first mentioned in 899. Between 1216 and 1806, it served as the capital of the Franconian branch of the Teutonic Order, and at least for some years, the residence of the order's grandmaster at the end of 18th century. At the end of World War II, Ellingen was bombed by US Airforce although it had no military or industrial importance. The town has a baroque palace, Ellingen Residence, and several other baroque and rococo buildings. The Swabian Rezat river flows through Ellingen.

== Transport ==
Ellingen has a railway station on the Nuremberg - Treuchtlingen - Augsburg line. By the Bundesstraße 2 and 13, it is well connected to Nuremberg (B2), Augsburg (B2), Ingolstadt (B13) and Ansbach (B13).

The list of the personalities of the city of Ellingen includes the name of Ellingen, a town in the Landkreis Weißenburg-Gunzenhausen, born personalities as well as those who enter the city because, for example, they had their (main) effect here without being born there. All sections are sorted chronologically according to the year of birth. The list does not claim to be complete.

== Sons and daughters of the city ==
- Eitel Klein (1906-1990), painter and graphic artist from Hörlbach

== People associated with the place ==
- Maximilian Friedrich von Königsegg-Rothenfels (1708-1784), bishop
- Rudolf Kleiner (1758-1822), German lawyer and administrative officer
- Carl Philipp von Wrede (1767-1838), Bavarian general field marshal and diplomat
- Herbert Lang (born 1936), German Catholic priest and historian, pastor in Ellingen
