= Hahnenkamm (Verwaltungsgemeinschaft) =

- Verwaltungsgemeinschaft
- Location of Hahnenkamm within Weißenburg-Gunzenhausen district
- Interactive map of Hahnenkamm
- Location within Germany Location within Bavaria
- Coordinates: 49°01′N 10°45′E
- Country: Germany
- State: Bavaria
- Admin. region: Middle Franconia
- District: Weißenburg-Gunzenhausen
- Seat: Heidenheim
- Subdivisions: 3 municipalities

Area
  - Total: 93.05 km^{2} (35.93 sq mi)

Population (2025-12-31)
  - Total: 4,440
  - Density: 47.7/km^{2} (124/sq mi)
- Time zone: UTC+01:00 (CET)
  - Summer (DST): UTC+02:00 (CEST)
- Website: www.hahnenkamm.de

Hahnenkamm is a Verwaltungsgemeinschaft (federation of municipalities) in the district of Weißenburg-Gunzenhausen in Bavaria in Germany. It consists of the following municipalities:

- Gnotzheim
- Heidenheim
- Westheim
