= Gunzenhausen station =

Railway station in Gunzenhausen, Germany

Gunzenhausen
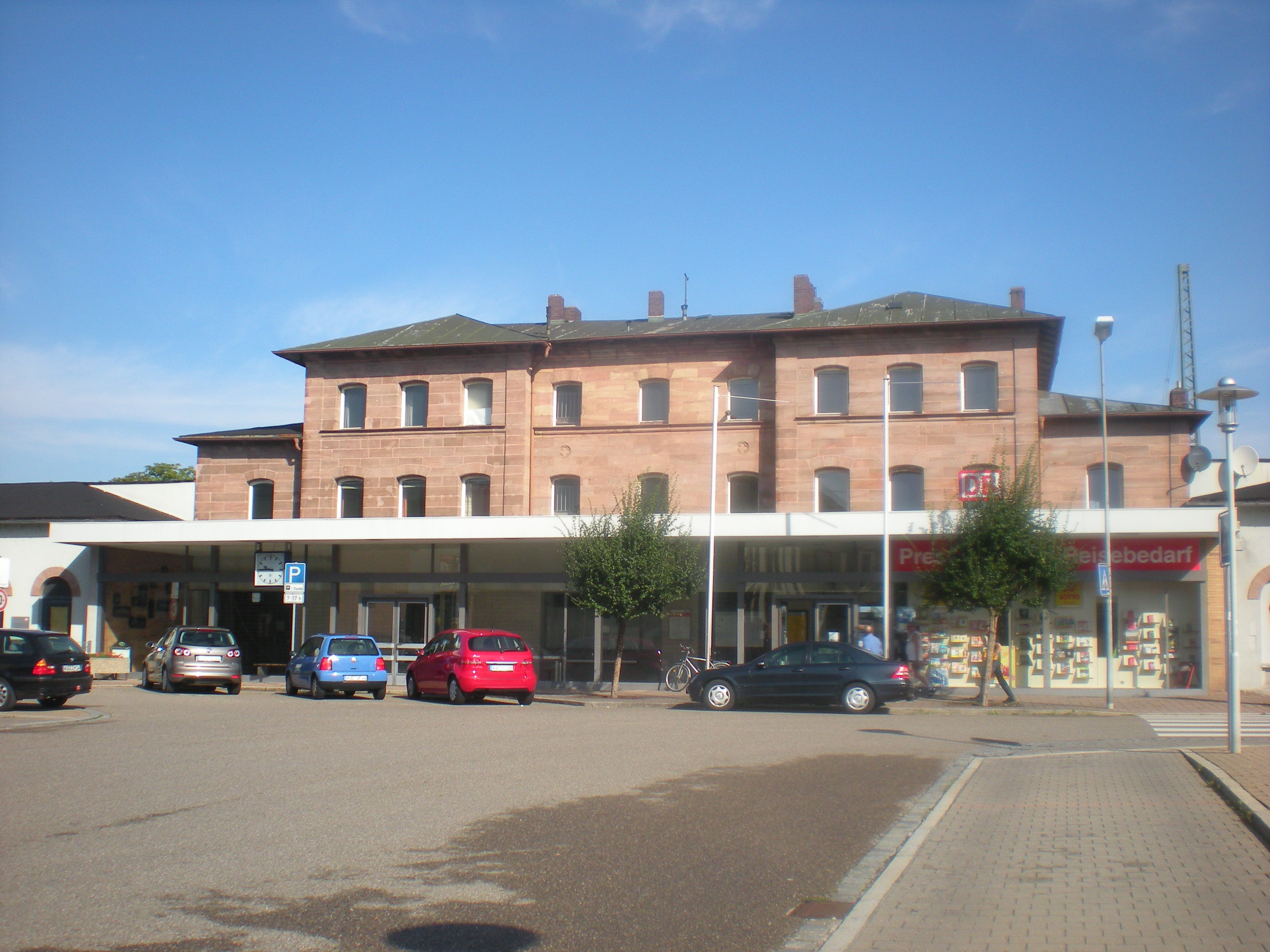

General information
- Location: Bahnhofsplatz 3, Gunzenhausen, Bavaria; Germany
- Coordinates: 49°7′14″N 10°45′20″E
- Owner: DB Netz
- Operator: DB Station&Service
- Lines: Würzburg–Treuchtlingen (KBS 920); Gunzenhausen–Pleinfeld (KBS 912); Nördlingen–Gunzenhausen (freight and museum services)
- Platforms: 5

Construction
- Accessible: No

Other information
- Station code: 6252
- DS100 code: NGUN
- IBNR: 8000385
- Category: 4
- Fare zone: VGN: 1737
- Website: stationsdatenbank.de; www.bahnhof.de

History
- Opened: 20 August 1849

Services
Preceding station		Following station
Muhr am See towards Würzburg Hbf	RE 80	Treuchtlingen towards München Hbf
Preceding station	DB Regio Bayern	Following station
Unterwurmbach towards Wassertrüdingen	RB 62	Langlau towards Pleinfeld
Location
- Location within Bavaria Location within Germany Location within Europe

Gunzenhausen station is, apart from Cronheim station on the Nördlingen–Pleinfeld railway, the only station in the Bavarian town of Gunzenhausen and a hub of Middle Franconia. It is classified by Deutsche Bahn as a category 4 station. and has five platform tracks. The station is served by about 60 trains daily operated by Deutsche Bahn, and is served by the Treuchtlingen–Würzburg railway. The Gunzenhausen–Pleinfeld railway (also known as the Seenlandbahn or "Lakeland railway") and the Nördlingen–Gunzenhausen line, which is served by steam-hauled services on some days, also begin in Gunzenhausen. Ordinary services between Gunzenhausen and Wassertrüdingen are being restored on the Nördlingen–Gunzenhausen line, although the planned reopening in December 2024 has been postponed.

== Location ==
The station is located to the north of the centre of Gunzenhausen. The station building is located on the station forecourt (Bahnhofplatz) at the ends of Bahnhofstraße and Schillerstraße. Ansbacher Straße passes under the tracks to the west of the station. Alemannenstraße is to the north of the tracks. The station has the address of Bahnhofplatz 3.

== History ==
Gunzenhausen station was opened on 20 August 1849 in conjunction with the Oettingen–Gunzenhausen section of the Ludwig South-North Railway. The line's extension to Schwabach and put into operation on 1 October 1849 and the entire Ludwig South-North Railway from Hof via Bamberg, Nuremberg, Nördlingen, Augsburg and Kempten to Lindau in operation on 1 March 1854. The route ran via Nördlingen and Gunzenhausen as a direct route through the Franconian Alb was uneconomical at the time because of the necessary gradients. On 1 July 1859 the line to Ansbach was opened to connect the city to the Ludwig South-North Railway. This line was extended to Würzburg on 1 July 1864 and this was followed by the extension from Gunzenhausen to Treuchtlingen on 2 October 1869. On 1 October 1906, a new section of the Treuchtlingen–Nuremberg railway was opened, which ran directly to Treuchtlingen, making the detour via Nördlingen and the Franconian Jura unnecessary. As a result, the Ludwig South-North Railway and Gunzenhausen station lost importance.

Deutsche Bundesbahn closed passenger services on the Nördlingen–Gunzenhausen line on 29 September 1985 and freight operations on 1 August 1995. Since 8 June 2003, the line has been operated by the Bavarian Railway Museum (Bayerische Eisenbahnmuseum). In addition to regular freight traffic, the Schwarzkopf factory in Wassertrüdingen is served.

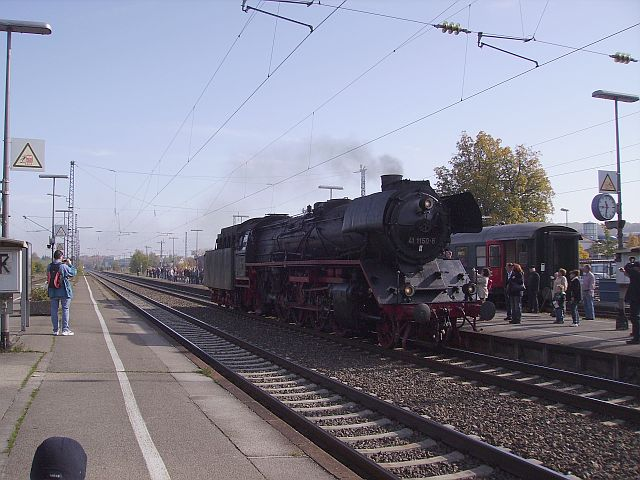
Preserved locomotive 41 1150 in Gunzenhausen

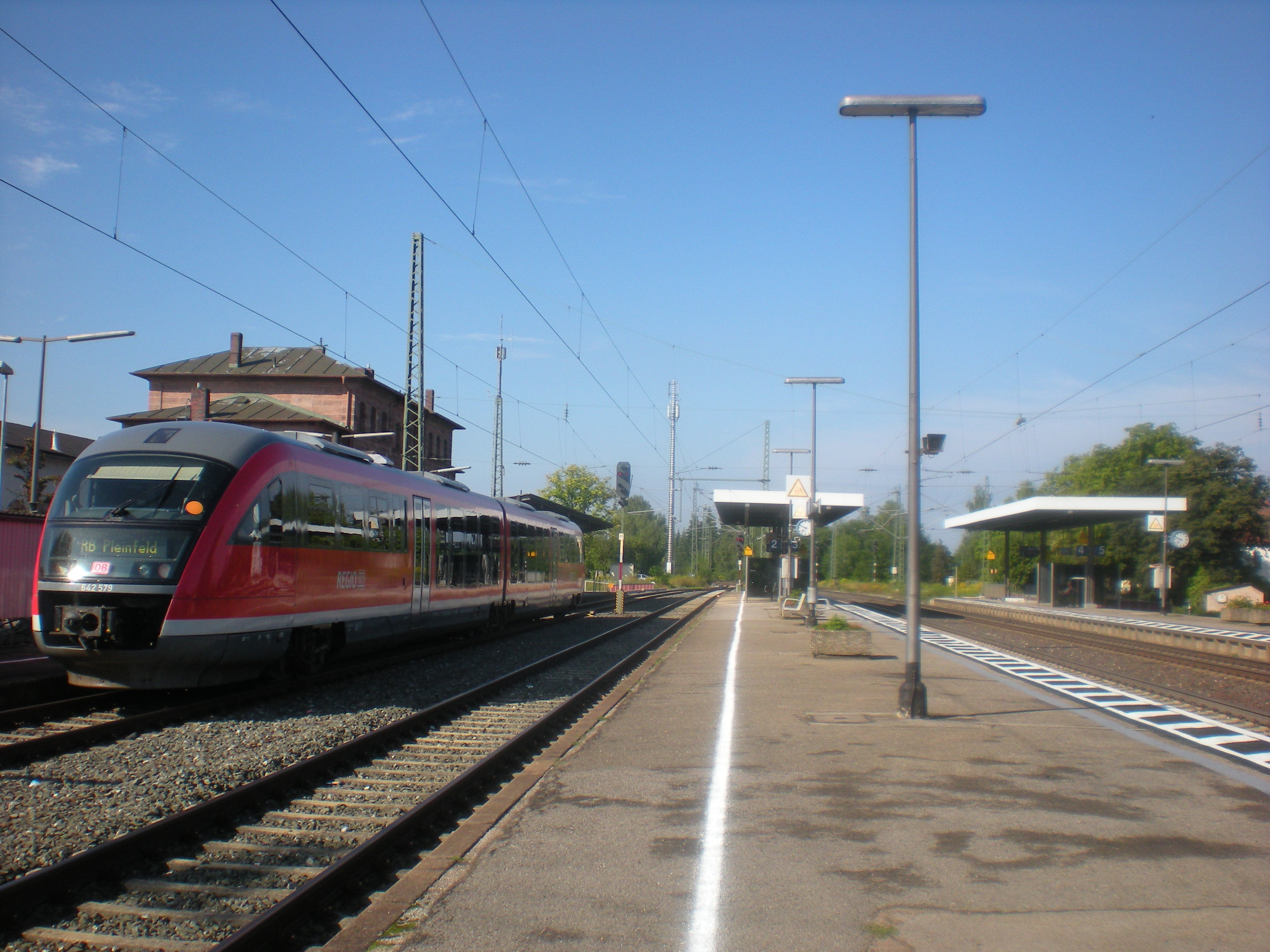
Platforms with a Regionalbahn service towards Pleinfeld

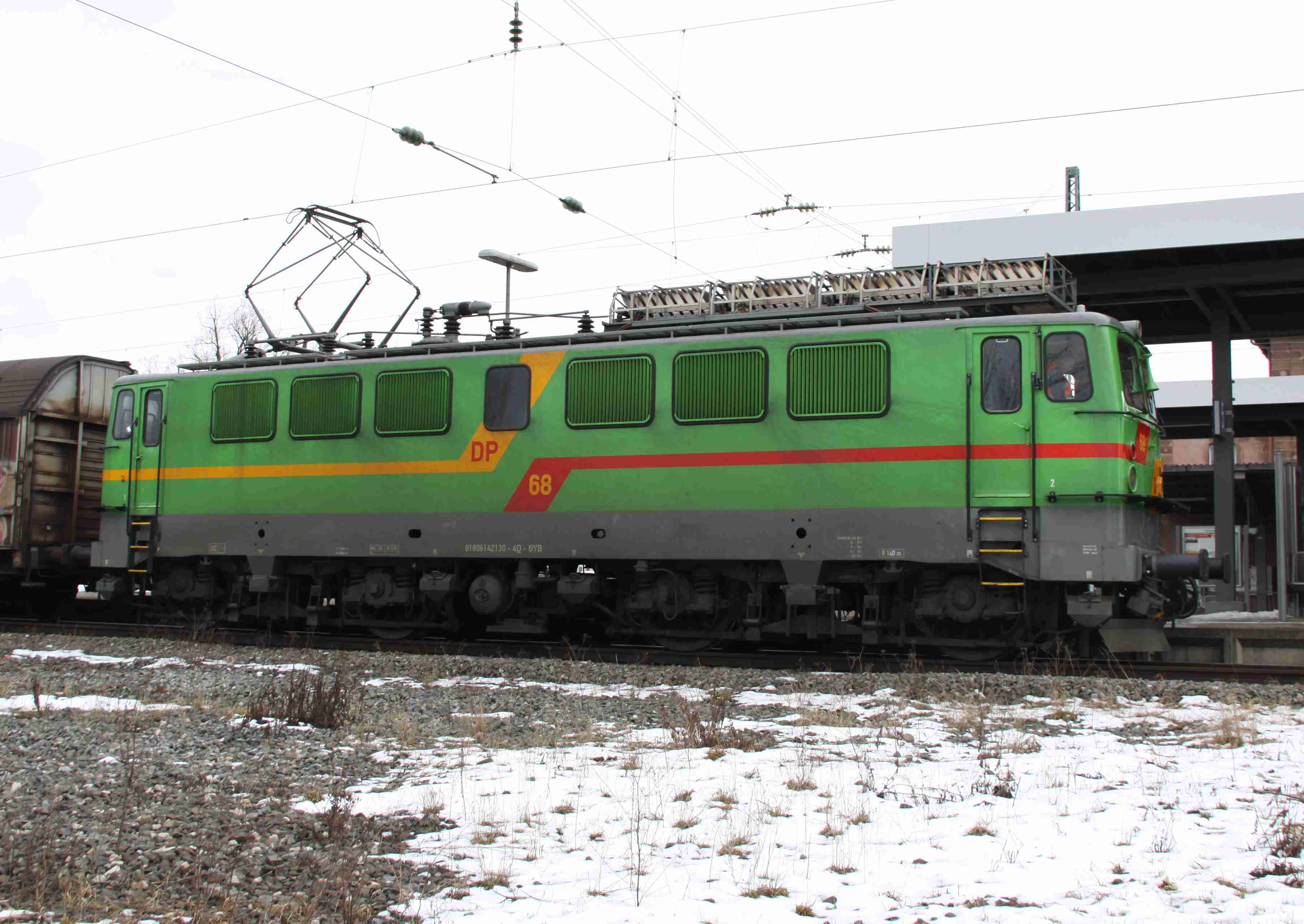
On occasions locomotive 142 130 of the BayernBahn operates (2011)

== Infrastructure ==
The station has five tracks next to three platforms, all of which are covered. The two island platforms are connected by a pedestrian underpass to the “home” platform (platform 1, next to the station building). There are no digital destination displays and the station is not accessible by wheelchairs. Track 1 is used by Regionalbahn trains to Pleinfeld. Track 3 is used by regional services to Würzburg and track 4 is used by regional services towards Treuchtlingen. Track 5 is used by heritage trains to Nördlingen and on working days freight trains to Wassertrüdingen while track 2 is only used by the daily freight train from the factory in Wassertrüdingen which brings freight wagons to the railway sidings in Gunzenhausen. The station building has a ticket office, which is no longer staffed, and shops.

Deutsche Bahn plans to expand the station to make it barrier-free, with the platforms raised and a new pedestrian underpass built in 2026. To this end, DB InfraGO applied to the Federal Railway Authority on 19 April 2024 for approval for the project, which will include rebuilding the platforms and replacing the pedestrian underpass at the western end of the platforms with a new pedestrian underpass in the middle of the platform. By decision of 30 September 2024, the Federal Railway Authority approved the renovation and conversion of the station building. The corresponding services were put out to tender at the end of 2024/beginning of 2025.

=== Platform data ===
Platform lengths and heights are as follows:

- Track 1: length 170 m, height 22 cm
- Track 2: length 160 m, height 38 cm
- Track 3: length 364 m, height 38 cm
- Track 4: length 358 m, height 38 cm
- Track 5: length 199 m, height 38 cm

== Services ==
Gunzenhausen station is served hourly by the Würzburg–Treuchtlingen Regionalbahn service, operated with class 440 EMUs as the Mainfrankenbahn. Regionalbahn services run hourly on the Gunzenhausen–Pleinfeld line between Gunzenhausen and Pleinfeld, operated with a Siemens Desiro Classic or a Alstom Coradia LINT diesel railcar. On some weekends steam hauled trains also run between Nördlingen and Gunzenhausen, although this line is to be reopened for regional trains by December 2024.

Train class	Route	Frequency
RE 80	Würzburg – Ochsenfurt – Steinach (b Rothenb) – Ansbach – Gunzenhausen – Treuchtlingen (– Donauwörth – Augsburg – Munich)	Hourly
RB 62	Wassertrüdingen – Gunzenhausen – Pleinfeld	Hourly
P	Nördlingen – Oettingen – Wassertrüdingen – Gunzenhausen	Two trains on some weekends

== Sources ==
- Wolfgang Klee (1993). Bayerische Eisenbahngeschichte. Part 1: 1835–1875 (in German). Fürstenfeldbruck: Merker. ISBN 3-922404-43-X.
- Wolfgang Klee (1993). Bayerische Eisenbahngeschichte. Part 2: 1875–1920 (in German). Fürstenfeldbruck: Merker. ISBN 3-922404-61-8.
- Stephan Kuchinke (1997). Die Ludwigs-Süd-Nordbahn von Lindau nach Hof (in German). Stuttgart: Transpress. ISBN 3-613-71064-1.
