= Pleinfeld station =

Railway station in Germany

Pleinfeld
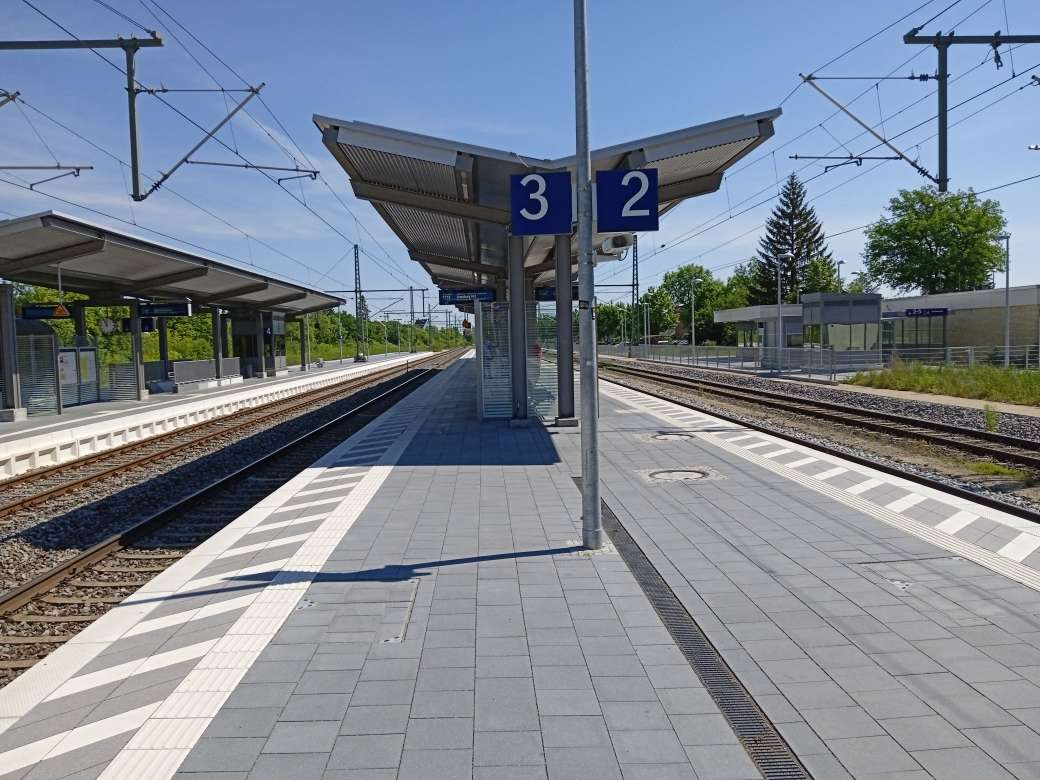
- 2022

General information
- Location: Bahnhofstr. 7, Pleinfeld, Bavaria; Germany
- Coordinates: 49°6′22″N 10°58′38″E
- Owner: DB Netz
- Operator: DB Station&Service
- Lines: Nuremberg–Augsburg (KBS 910); Nördlingen–Pleinfeld (KBS 912)
- Platforms: 4

Construction
- Accessible: Yes

Other information
- Station code: 4960
- DS100 code: NPLF
- IBNR: 8004835
- Category: 4
- Fare zone: VGN: 661 and 662
- Website: stationsdatenbank.de; www.bahnhof.de

History
- Opened: 1 October 1849

Services
Preceding station	DB Regio Bayern	Following station
Ellingen towards Augsburg Hbf	RE 16	Mühlstetten towards Nürnberg Hbf
Ellingen towards Treuchtlingen	RE 60	Mühlstetten towards Nürnberg Hbf
Mühlstetten towards Nürnberg Hbf	RB 16	Ellingen towards München Hbf
Ramsberg towards Gunzenhausen or Wassertrüdingen	RB 62	Terminus
Location
- Location within Bavaria Location within Germany

Pleinfeld station is at a railway junction on the Treuchtlingen–Nuremberg railway in the market town of Pleinfeld in the German state of Bavaria. It is classified by Deutsche Bahn as a category 4 station and has five platform tracks. The Nördlingen–Pleinfeld railway, which is now a secondary line, was built as part of the Ludwig South-North Railway, which reached Pleinfeld in 1849, 20 years before the line from Treuchtlingen, which forms part of the modern main line.

== History ==
The law authorising the construction of the Ludwig South-North Railway was adopted on 25 August 1843. The Bavarian King Ludwig I's decision that the line would run from Donauwörth via Nördlingen and Gunzenhausen to Nuremberg was proclaimed on 7 October. The Bavarian government confirmed this decision on 21 February 1844. The first land was acquired in the Pleinfeld area on 23 September 1845. A contract was awarded for the production of “objects” for Pleinfeld station on 28 February 1849 and the track plan for the station was approved by the Royal Railways Commission in Munich on 22 March 1849.

The opening of the Gunzenhausen–Pleinfeld–Schwabach line took place on 1 October 1849, closing the gap between Munich and Nuremberg.

The councils of the towns of Ellingen, Weißenburg and Pleinfeld applied on 7 April 1861 for the establishment of a two-track line from Pleinfeld to Weißenburg. On 17 May 1861, the Directorate General of the Royal Transport Institute (Königlichen Verkehrsanstalten) in Nuremberg, requested the extension of the line so that logs unusually large logs could be loaded. This request was reiterated on 16 July 1866.

The land required for the construction of the line between Treuchtlingen and Pleinfeld was determined on 19 March 1867 and the acquisition of land for the expansion of the station was approved on 12 September 1868. The line was opened on 2 October 1869.

The enlarged station was handed over for operation on 5 June 1873. After the extension of the tracks, there was a new main station building, a freight hall, a watering point, two public toilets, roundhouse I in the old warehouse, roundhouse II (newly constructed), a rail service residential building in the old station building, two signalman's houses, water cranes, a weighbridge and a turntable.

When planning started in 1875 for new lines in Bavaria, two possible routes, Pleinfeld–Kelheim via Heideck, Thalmaessing, Greding, Beilngries and Dietfurt and Pleinfeld–Schwandorf via Hilpoltstein, Freystadt and Neumarkt in der Oberpfalz were identified. The municipalities of Pleinfeld and Georgensgmünd both argued that these lines should connect in their town.

On 9 April 1904, Pleinfeld petitioned for the building of a marshalling yard, because it wanted to be a node for the operations of local freight traffic following the construction of the Donauwörth–Treuchtlingen line. For operational reasons, Gunzenhausen and Donauwörth were selected for this role. This new line was opened on 1 October 1906.

Pleinfeld requested electric power for lighting from the railway-owned power company on 7 February 1908. This was followed by an electricity supply contract on 22 March 1910.

The first sketches for the reconstruction of station emerged in 1911. The railway's management finally agreed on 23 July 1933 to improvements to the station and the line. An electro-mechanical interlocking of class VES was put into operation on 25 August 1933 and the electrification of the line was completed in 1935.

Towards the end of the Second World War the entire overhead wiring in the station area was destroyed by U.S. strafing on 5 March 1945. Rail operation with electric rolling stock, however, was maintained. The trains continued under their own momentum and were assisted by a steam locomotive back to the electrified section of track. Following the bombardment of a munitions train, ten freight wagons exploded in April 1945.

Operations on the line to Gunzenhausen were restored on 13 June 1945. From 5 November 1957 communications on the line between signalmen changed from telegraph to telephone. The first battery electric multiple unit of class ETA 150 ran from Pleinfeld to Nördlingen on 20 March 1959.

== Decline of the station ==
In 1972, the freight office was closed. In 1975/76 the old station building was closed and the station building and the platform underpass were rebuilt and the station tracks were rebuilt.

A new track plan interlocking of class Sp Dr S60 was put into operation on 31 July 1979. This interlocking was remotely controlled from Georgensgmünd station from 15 February 1982 and it was controlled from Weißenburg station from 1 June 1987.

The ticket office was opened only once a month for the sale of monthly passes from 31 May 1982 and it was closed completely in 1986 with the installation of ticket machines. The delivery of wagon-load freight ended in the summer of 1999.

Since the inauguration of the line S 3 of the Nuremberg S-Bahn between Nuremberg and Roth on 9 June 2001, Pleinfeld has only been served to and from Nuremberg by the Nuremberg–Treuchtlingen Regional-Express service, which takes only 33 or 36 minutes to reach Nuremberg.

The electrification of track 6 (a passing loop) was removed and the track was dismantled during the renewal of overhead lines in 2006.

== Infrastructure ==
Pleinfeld station has five tracks on three platforms. Track 1 is the “home” platform (next to the station building), and is no longer used for scheduled passenger services. Regional trains to Nuremberg stop on track 2 and regional trains to Treuchtlingen stop on track 3. Track 4 is used by Regionalbahn services to and from Gunzenhausen, while track 5 is no longer used for scheduled passenger services. The two island platforms are connected by an underpass to the “home” platform. The platforms are not covered and there is no destination displays. The station also has no barrier-free facilities for the disabled.

=== Platform data ===
Platform lengths and heights are as follows:

- Track 1: length 309 m, height 38 cm
- Track 2: length 309 m, height 38 cm
- Track 3: length 309 m, height 38 cm
- Track 4: length 303 m, height 38 cm
- Track 5: length 303 m, height 38 cm

== Services ==
Train class	Route	Frequency
RB 16	Nuremberg – Pleinfeld – Treuchtlingen – Donauwörth – Augsburg	Every 2 hours (some trains on weekends require a change in Treuchtlingen)
RE 60	Nuremberg – Pleinfeld – Treuchtlingen	Hourly service in Mon-Fri peaks
RB 16	Nuremberg – Pleinfeld – Treuchtlingen – Ingolstadt – Munich	Every 2 hours, hourly on Sunday
RB 62	Pleinfeld – Gunzenhausen	Hourly from Monday to Friday / every 2 hours on Sat and Sun

== Sand Railway ==
From 1925 to 1964 there was a line known as the Sandbahn (Sand Railway) with a 600 mm gauge, which brought sand from sand pits to the loading dock at the station.
