= Treuchtlingen–Nuremberg railway =

Railway line in Bavaria, Germany

Treuchtlingen–Nuremberg

Overview
- Native name: Bahnstrecke Treuchtlingen–Nürnberg
- Status: Operational
- Owner: DB Netz
- Line number: 5320
- Locale: Bavaria, Germany
- Termini: Treuchtlingen; Nuremberg

Service
- Type: Heavy rail, Passenger/freight rail Regional rail, Commuter rail, Intercity rail
- Route number: 900, 910, 970.1
- Operator(s): DB Regio Bayern

History
- Opened: 3 stages in 1849 and 1869

Technical
- Line length: 61.812 km (38.408 mi)
- Number of tracks: Double track
- Track gauge: 1,435 mm (4 ft 8 1/2 in) standard gauge
- Electrification: 15 kV/16.7 Hz AC overhead catenary
- Operating speed: 160 km/h (99 mph)

The Treuchtlingen–Nuremberg railway is a 62 km long main line in the German state of Bavaria. It essentially follows the valleys of the rivers Swabian Rezat and Rednitz, downstream. Most of it, from Pleinfeld to Nuremberg, is constituted by parts of the historic Ludwig South-North Railway, one of the oldest lines in Germany. Today, even after the opening of the Nuremberg–Ingolstadt high-speed railway, it is still used for long-distance services. It is also used as a detour during closures of the high speed line for maintenance. Between Nuremberg and Roth S-Bahn services run on the parallel Nuremberg–Roth line.

== History ==
The first plans for a railway line from Augsburg to Nuremberg were made shortly after the opening of the first railway line in Germany, the Nuremberg–Fürth line in 1835. Merchants from the Augsburg area formed a joint-stock company for the construction and operation of a line from Augsburg to Nuremberg via Donauwörth and Treuchtlingen. The company was dissolved in 1841 because it was understood that King Ludwig I intended to build a state railway and because the company had decided that the difficult geography between Donauwörth and Treuchtlingen (the Franconian Alb) made it impossible to build and operate a railway economically.

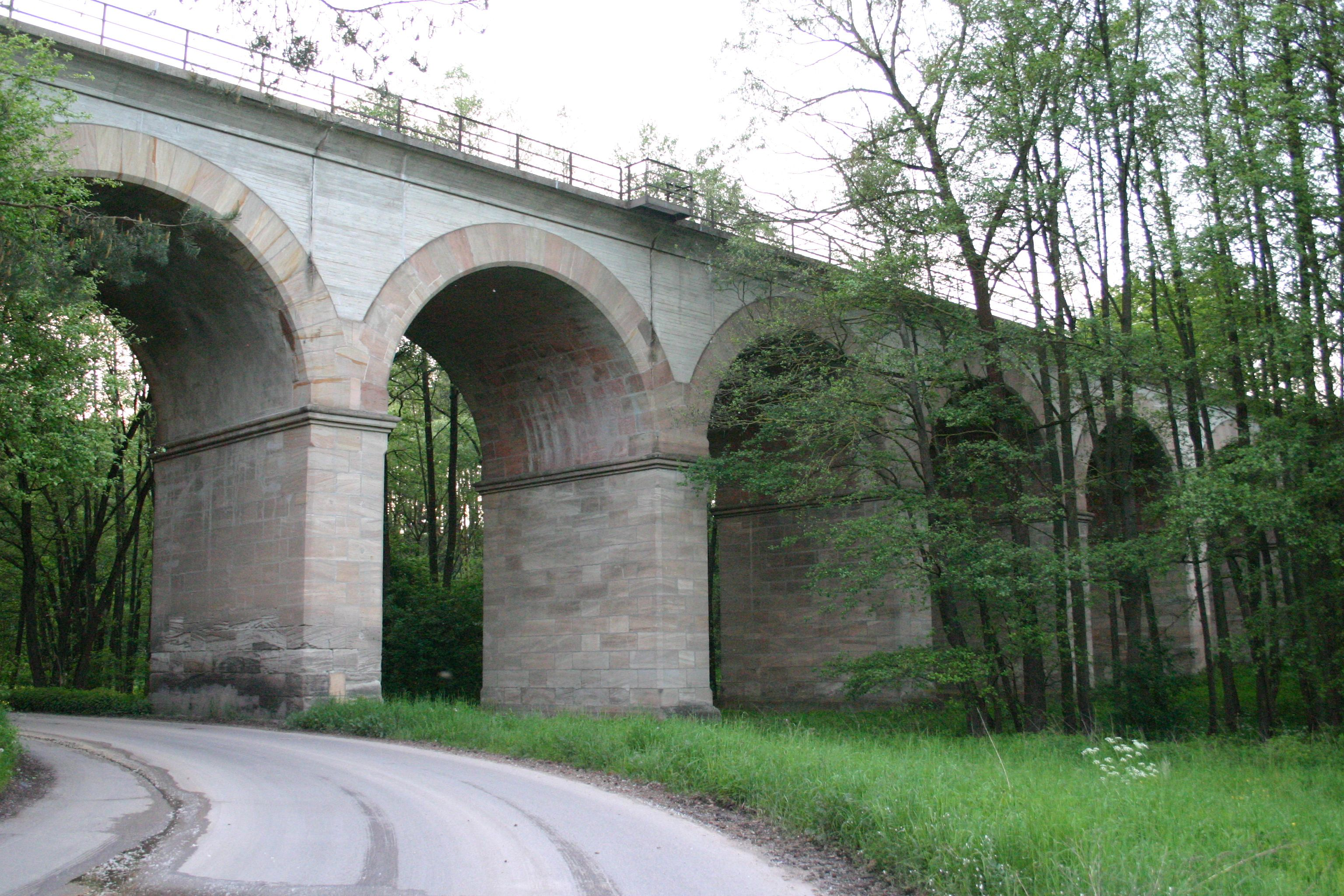
Brombach viaduct with its seven spans dates from the opening of the line and is now heritage-listed

The Bavarian state government handled the problem of crossing the Franconian Alb by routing the Ludwig South-North Railway through the Nordlinger Ries depression. Therefore, only the Augsburg–Donauwörth and Pleinfeld–Nuremberg sections of the Nuremberg–Augsburg line were part of the South-North Railway, which was authorised by the Bavarian parliament on 25 August 1843. The Treuchtlingen–Pleinfeld section was built in connection with the construction of the Ingolstadt–Treuchtlingen line and opened on 2 October 1869. The gap between Donauwörth and Treuchtlingen was not completed until 1 October 1906, when more advanced steam engines made the operation of the hilly line more economic.

On 1 October 1898, the flying junction between Nuremberg suburbs of Eibach and Reichelsdorf was opened, allowing a grade-separated entrance for freight trains to the Nuremberg marshalling yard. Work on the electrification of the line began in 1933 and was completed on 10 May 1935.

On 29 June 1994, a ground breaking ceremony was held for the beginning of the rebuilding of the section from Nuremberg Hauptbahnhof to Roth for S-Bahn operations, which was completed on 9 June 2001.

The overhead wiring of the line, mostly dating from 1935, was renewed between 2004 and 2006.

=== Opening dates ===
- 1 April 1849 (Nuremberg–Schwabach)
- 1 October 1849 (Schwabach–Pleinfeld)
- 2 October 1869 (Treuchtlingen–Pleinfeld)

== Route ==
The route leaves Nuremberg Hauptbahnhof, initially running parallel with the lines to Crailsheim, Bamberg and Würzburg, running to the west. It passes under the Frankenschnellweg freeway and then makes a long turn to the south. It passes through the districts of Sandreuth, Schweinau and Werderau and then crosses the South-west Tangent (Südwesttangente) freeway, the Rhine–Main–Danube Canal and the Ring line, where there is an extensive system of connecting lines and reaches the flying junction between the stations of Eibach and Reichelsdorf, which are now stations for the S-Bahn only. The flying junction allows the S-Bahn tracks to switch from the west of the main line tracks to the east. In addition, the south main line track switches to the right, as trains have been running on the left since Nuremberg Hauptbahnhof, unusually for Germany.

The line runs through the Nuremberg districts of Reichelsdorf, Reichelsdorfer Keller and Katzwang and the Schwabach districts of Limbach and Waldsiedlung, crosses the Rednitz and Schwabach rivers and finally reaches Schwabach station. The line makes a turn to the left and then runs parallel to the Rednitz through Rednitzhembach and via Roth to Georgensgmünd and from there parallel to Federal Highway 2 and the Rezat river to Pleinfeld. In Roth, the line to Hilpoltstein (also known as the Greding Railway, Gredlbahn) branches off. Until 1995, a line branched from Georgensgmünd to Spalt. Another branch, known as the Lakeland Railway (Seenlandbahn), as it passes through the Franconian Lake District, connects Pleinfeld with Gunzenhausen; it was part of the original Ludwig South-North Railway. The line continues to the Baroque town of Ellingen and Weißenburg, which was established on a Roman settlement. North of Weißenburg the line crosses the Swabian Rezat river. Just before the railway junction in Treuchtlingen with the lines from Wurzburg and to Ingolstadt, the line crosses the remnants of the ancient Fossa Carolina canal and the Altmühl river.

=== Development ===
The route is double track and electrified throughout. Between Nuremberg and Roth the line runs parallel with the one or two-track Nuremberg-Roth S-Bahn line. In addition, between Nuremberg station and Reichelsdorf trains run on the left, to facilitate connections with the Nuremberg ring line.

The first Federal Transport Infrastructure Plan of 1973 identified a high-speed line between Würzburg and Augsburg via Nuremberg as one of eight development projects. The line was listed as the Würzburg–Augsburg high-speed railway line in the Coordinated Investment Program of the Federal Transport Infrastructure Plan of 1977. It was also identified as being an urgent priority in the Federal Transport Infrastructure Plan of 1985.

=== Transport associations ===
Regional services on the line are administered by the Greater Nuremberg Transport Association (Verkehrsverbund Großraum Nürnberg, VGN).

== Rail services ==
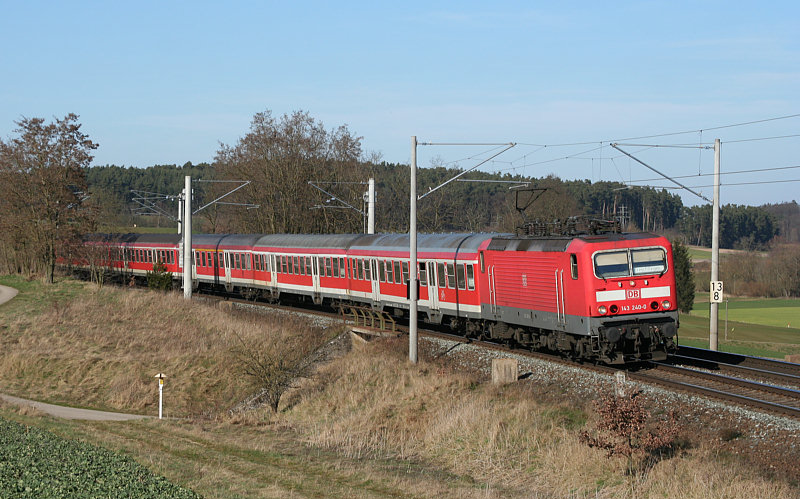
Class 143 with Silberling coaches between Nuremberg und Treuchtlingen

Intercity Express and Intercity trains operate long-distance services over the line.

The line is served every two hours by RE 16 Regional-Express trains that continue to Augsburg. These are usually operated by Twindexx Vario railcars. The RB 16 Regionalbahn service operates on the hour in between the RE 16 service. Both services stop at all stations on the line. RE 60 services also operate hourly in peak periods.

From the timetable change on 10 December 2006, a direct link between Nuremberg and Lindau was operated under the name of Allgäu-Franken-Express, using diesel multiple units of class 612 because of the section between Augsburg and Lindau is not electrified. The three pairs of trains occasionally stopped in Treuchtlingen and Donauwörth and, after the departure of many Intercity Express and Intercity trains from this route, created a fast connection between Augsburg and the long-distance hub of Nuremberg. The Allgäu-Franken-Express was eventually replaced by the Regional-Express lines RE 7 (to/from Lindau-Reutin) and RE 17 (to/from Oberstdorf), which are split/joined in Immenstadt, currently operating twice a day each way and stopping in Treuchtlingen and Nuremberg.

== Sources ==
=== References ===
- Bufe, Siegfried (1980). Eisenbahn in Mittelfranken (Railways in Middle Franconia (in German). Munich: Bufe-Fachbuchverlag. ISBN 3-922138-09-8.
- Bergsteiner, Leonhard (1989). Eisenbahn im Altmühltal (Railways in Altmühltal (in German). Nordhorn: Verlag Kenning. ISBN 3-9800952-7-4.
- Hörstelm Eisenschink and Jürgen, Bernd (1990). Bahnen in Süddeutschland (Railways in Southern Germany) (in German). Zürich: Orell Füssli Verlag. ISBN 3-280-01897-8.
- Dollinger, Andreas (2007). "Eine Lücke im System – 100 Jahre Bahnstrecke Treuchtlingen – Donauwörth (A gap in the system – 100 years of the Treuchtlingen – Donauwörth railway)". LOK-Magazin (in German) (1). Munich: Geramond-Verlag.
- Frank, Jörg and Rolf (1989). Eisenbahnkreuz Treuchtlingen (Treuchtlingen railway junction) (in German). Egglham: Bufe-Fachbuchverlag. ISBN 3-922138-35-7.
- Erhart, Ernst (2000). Eisenbahnknoten Augsburg: Drehscheibe des Eisenbahnverkehrs (Augsburg railway junction: a rail transport hub) (in German). Munich: Geramond-Verlag. ISBN 3-932785-23-1.
