= Wassertrüdingen station =

Railway station in the municipality of Wassertrüdingen

Wassertrüdingen
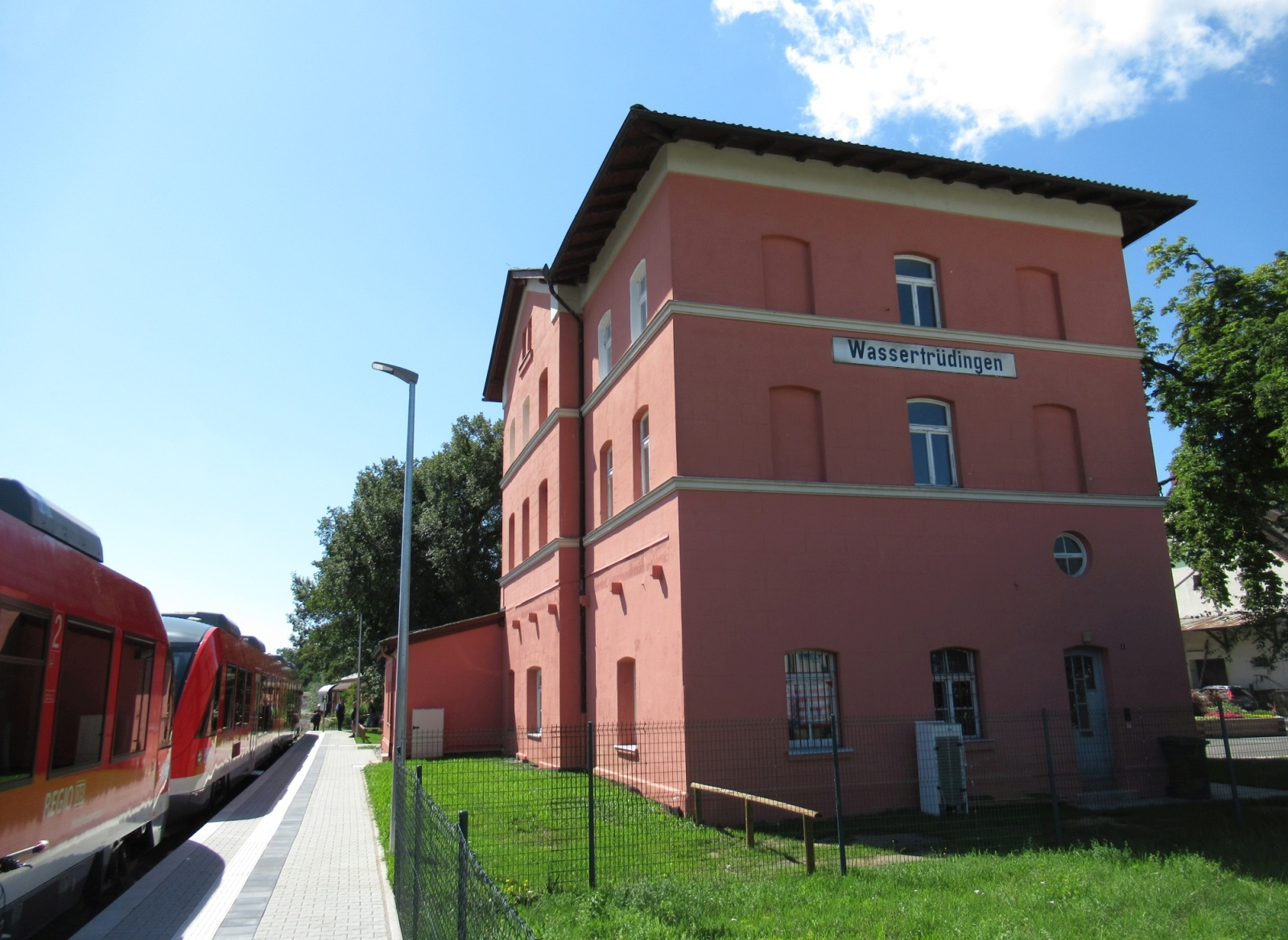

General information
- Location: Bahnhofspl. 1; 91717 Wassertrüdingen; Bavaria; Germany
- Coordinates: 49°2′38″N 10°36′26″E
- Elevation: 425 m (1,394 ft)
- System: Bf
- Owner: BayernBahn
- Operator: BayernBahn
- Line: Nördlingen–Pleinfeld railway (KBS 12990)
- Platforms: 1 side platform
- Tracks: 2
- Train operators: DB Regio Bayern; BayernBahn
- Connections: Bus interchange

Construction
- Parking: yes
- Accessible: yes

Other information
- Station code: n/a
- DS100 code: MWTD
- IBNR: 8070567
- Fare zone: VGN: 1747

Services
Preceding station	DB Regio Bayern	Following station
Terminus	RB 62	Unterschwaningen towards Pleinfeld
Location
- Location within Bavaria Location within Germany Location within Europe

Wassertrüdingen station is a railway station in the municipality of Wassertrüdingen, located in the Ansbach district in Bavaria, Germany. The station lies on the Nördlingen–Pleinfeld railway. The train services are operated by DB Regio Bayern and for the museum traffic BayernBahn.

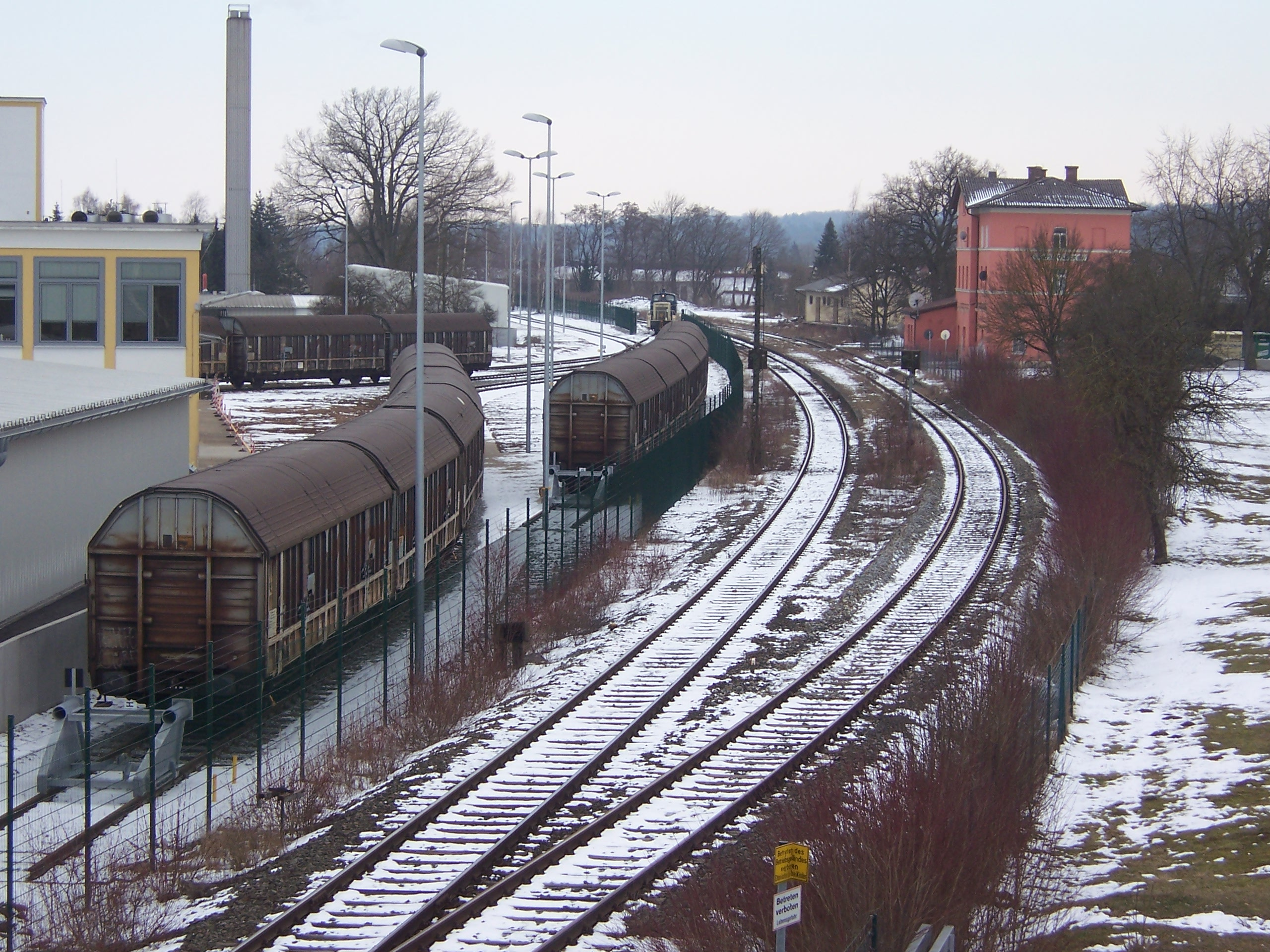
Station seen from the north
