= Treuchtlingen station =

Railway station in Germany

Treuchtlingen
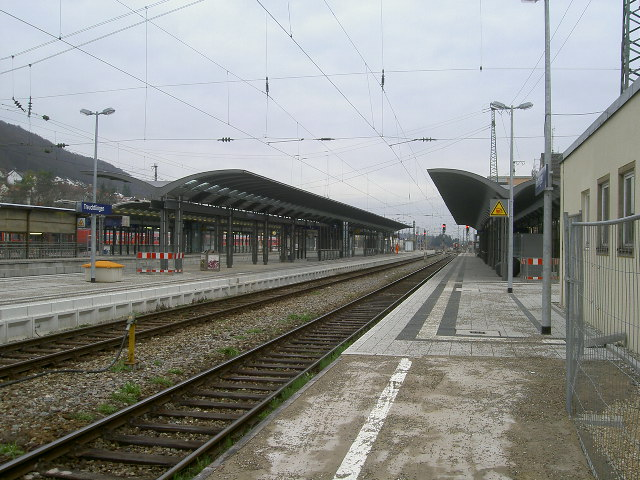
- Platforms at Treuchtlingen station

General information
- Location: Bahnhofstr. 61, Treuchtlingen, Bavaria; Germany
- Coordinates: 48°57′41″N 10°54′29″E
- Owner: Deutsche Bahn
- Operator: DB Station&Service
- Lines: Treuchtlingen–Nuremberg (KBS 910); Donauwörth–Treuchtlingen (KBS 910); Treuchtlingen–Würzburg (KBS 920); Ingolstadt–Treuchtlingen (KBS 990)
- Platforms: 4
- Tracks: 7

Construction
- Accessible: Yes

Other information
- Station code: 6252
- DS100 code: MTL
- IBNR: 8000122
- Category: 3
- Fare zone: VGN: 683
- Website: stationsdatenbank.de; www.bahnhof.de

History
- Opened: 2 October 1869
Services
Preceding station	DB Fernverkehr	Following station
Nürnberg Hbf towards Berlin Gesundbrunnen or Hamburg-Altona	ICE 18	Donauwörth towards München Hbf
Ansbach towards Hamburg-Altona	ICE 24	Donauwörth towards Innsbruck Hbf or Schwarzach-St.Veit
Preceding station	DB Regio Bayern	Following station
Weißenburg towards Nürnberg Hbf	RE 16	Otting-Weilheim towards Augsburg Hbf
Nürnberg Hbf Terminus	RE 17 selected trains only	Donauwörth towards Oberstdorf
Weißenburg towards Nürnberg Hbf	RE 60	Terminus
Weißenburg towards Nürnberg Hbf	RB 16	Pappenheim towards München Hbf
Gunzenhausen towards Würzburg Hbf	RB 80	Terminus
Preceding station		Following station
Gunzenhausen towards Würzburg Hbf	RE 80	Otting-Weilheim towards München Hbf
Location
- Location within Bavaria Location within Germany Location within Europe

Treuchtlingen station is now the only station in the town of Treuchtlingen in the German state of Bavaria. The town used also to have stations at Graben, Möhren, Gundelsheim and Wettelsheim. Treuchtlingen station has seven platform tracks and it is classified by Deutsche Bahn as a category 3 station. The station is served by about 110 trains daily operated by DB Regio and DB long-distance. The station is a railway junction on the Treuchtlingen–Nuremberg, Donauwörth–Treuchtlingen, Ingolstadt–Treuchtlingen and Treuchtlingen–Würzburg lines.

== Location ==
The station is located in northern Treuchtlingen. It is bordered to the west by Wettelsheimer Straße and to the east by Bahnhofsstraße, which is also the location of the entrance building. A bridge connects these streets south of the premises of the railway station. The address of the station is 61 Bahnhofsstraße.

== History ==
Treuchtlingen station was opened on 2 October 1869 together with both the Ansbach–Treuchtlingen section of the line to Würzburg and the Treuchtlingen–Pleinfeld lines. The Treuchtlingen–Pleinfeld section was built together with the Ingolstadt–Treuchtlingen railway. Opposite the station building there was a small depot for the maintenance of the trains. In 1870 Treuchtlingen received another link to the rail network with the completion of the Munich–Ingolstadt–Treuchtlingen–Nuremberg railway. On 1 October 1906, the Donauwörth–Treuchtlingen line was opened, which was previously regarded as uneconomic to build because of the gradients required. This completed the direct Nuremberg–Augsburg line and made the detour of the Ludwig South-North Railway (German: Ludwig-Süd-Nord-Bahn) through Nördlingen unnecessary. On 23 February 1945, an air raid on the station as part of Operation Clarion killed about 600 people, including about 300 taking shelter in the station underpass. With the completion of the Nuremberg–Ingolstadt high-speed railway in late 2006 the station lost most of the long-distance services between Nuremberg and Munich that had previously stopped there.

== Infrastructure ==
The station has seven platform tracks next to four platforms, with platform 1 next to the entrance building. Each platform is covered and has a digital platform display. All platforms are connected by a pedestrian tunnel connected to platform 1. The station is accessible by wheelchair and there is a step-free access to each platform. At the station there is parking and bus connections to Weißenburg, Bieswang, Solnhofen, Gunzenhausen, Langenaltheim, Polsingen and Gundelsheim available. The station is located in the regional transport area administered by the Verkehrsverbund Großraum Nürnberg (Greater Nuremberg Transport Association, VGN).

=== Platform data ===
- Platform 1: length 145 m, height 55 cm
- Platform 2: length 293 m, height 55 cm
- Platform 3: length 293 m, height 55 cm
- Platform 4: length 382 m, height 76 cm
- Platform 5: length 382 m, height 76 cm
- Platform 6: length 290 m, height 55 cm
- Platform 7: length 290 m, height 55 cm

== Rail services ==
=== Long-distance ===
In the 2026 timetable, the following service operated by Deutsche Bahn stops at the station:

Line	Route	Frequency
ICE 18	Hamburg-Altona – Hamburg – Berlin – Erfurt – Halle – Nuremberg – Treuchtlingen – Augsburg – Munich	Some trains
ICE 24	Hamburg-Altona – Hamburg – Hannover – Göttingen – Kassel-Wilhelmshöhe – Würzburg – Treuchtlingen – Donauwörth – Augsburg – Munich (– Rosenheim – Wörgl – Schwarzach-St. Veit)	Some trains

=== Regional ===
Treuchtlingen station i.In the 2026 timetable, the following service operated by is served by three Regional-Express services and two Regionalbahn services operated by DB Regio and Go-Ahead Bayern:

Line	Route	Frequency
RE 60	Treuchtlingen – Pleinfeld – Nuremberg	Hourly in the peak
RE 16	Augsburg – Donauwörth – Treuchtlingen – Nuremberg	Every two hours
RB 16	Munich – Ingolstadt – Eichstätt – Treuchtlingen (– Nuremberg)	Hourly: Munich–Treuchtlingen Every two hours: Treuchtlingen–Nuremberg
RE 80; RB 80	(Gemünden (Main) – Karlstadt (Main) –) Würzburg – Steinach – Ansbach – Gunzenhausen – Treuchtlingen (– Donauwörth – Augsburg – Munich)	Hourly: Würzburg–Treuchtlingen; Every two hours: Treuchtlingen–Munich
As of 12 December 2025
