= Ansbach station =

Railway station in Ansbach, Germany

Ansbach
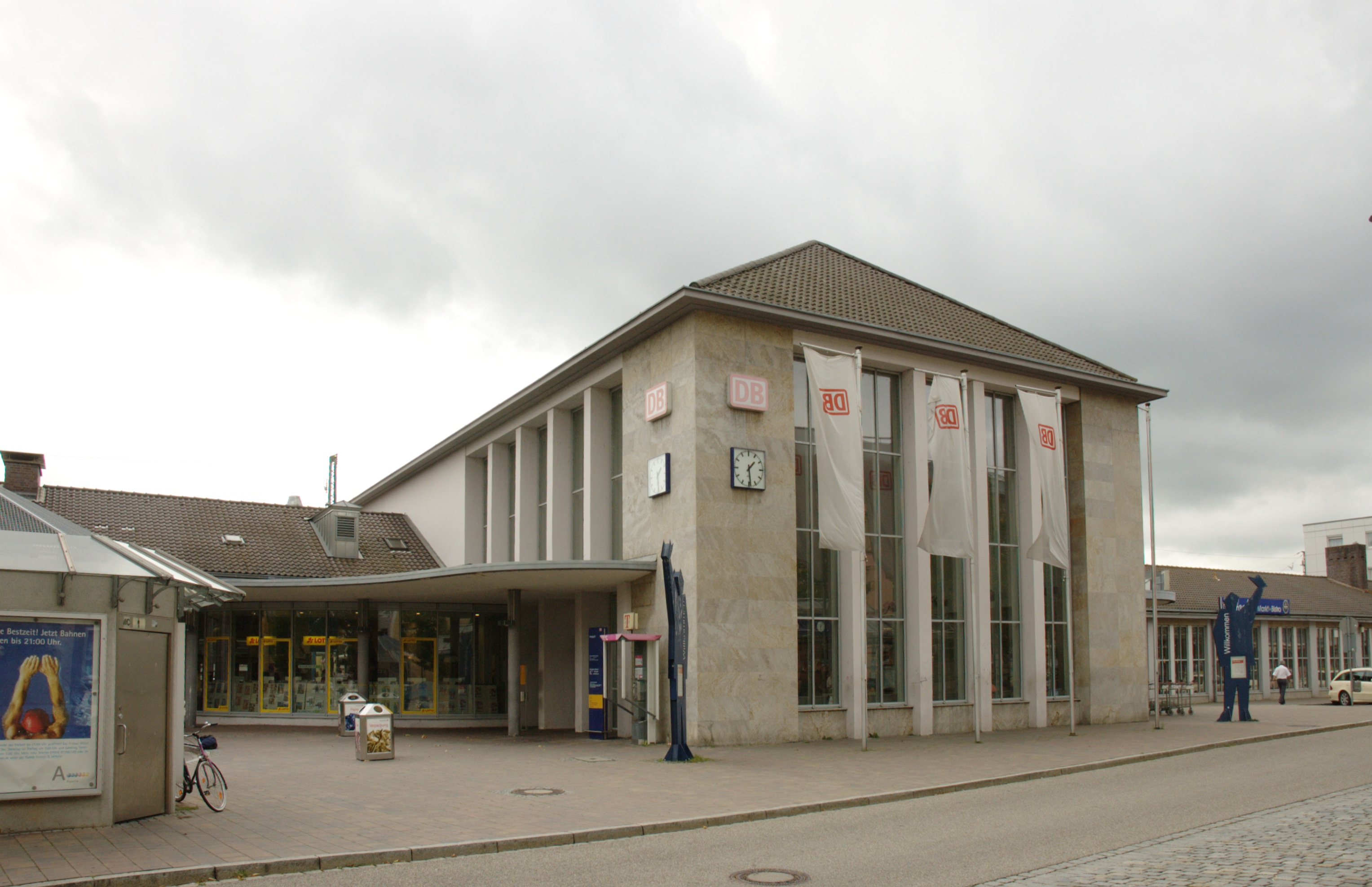
- Station forecourt and reception building

General information
- Location: Bahnhofplatz 2 Ansbach, Bavaria; Germany
- Coordinates: 49°17′53″N 10°34′42″E
- Owner: DB Netz
- Operator: DB Station&Service
- Lines: Treuchtlingen–Würzburg line (KBS 900, 920); Nürnberg–Crailsheim line (KBS 786, 891.7)
- Distance: 43.7 km (27.2 mi) from Nürnberg Hauptbahnhof; 51.4 km (31.9 mi) from Treuchtlingen
- Platforms: 2 bay platforms; 2 island platforms; 1 side platform
- Tracks: 7
- Train operators: DB Fernverkehr; DB Regio Bayern; Go-Ahead Baden-Württemberg

Construction
- Accessible: Yes

Other information
- Station code: 161
- DS100 code: NAN
- IBNR: 8000009
- Category: 3
- Fare zone: VGN: 762 and 1701
- Website: BEG station fact file; www.bahnhof.de

History
- Opened: 1 July 1859

Services
Preceding station	DB Fernverkehr	Following station
Würzburg Hbf towards Hamburg-Altona	ICE 24	Treuchtlingen towards Innsbruck Hbf or Schwarzach-St.Veit
Crailsheim towards Karlsruhe Hbf	IC 61	Nürnberg Hbf towards Nürnberg Hbf or Leipzig Hbf
Preceding station		Following station
Leutershausen-Wiedersbach towards Stuttgart Hbf	RE 90	Wicklesgreuth towards Nürnberg Hbf
Preceding station		Following station
Oberdachstetten towards Würzburg Hbf	RE 80	Triesdorf towards München Hbf
Preceding station	Nuremberg S-Bahn	Following station
Leutershausen-Wiedersbach towards Crailsheim	S4	Sachsen (b Ansbach) towards Nürnberg Hbf
Location

Ansbach station is the central transportation hub in the town of Ansbach in southern Germany. It is here that two main lines cross: the Nürnberg–Crailsheim and Treuchtlingen–Würzburg railways.

== History ==
Ansbach was first connected to the railway network by a leased railway, that linked the town to the Ludwig South-North Railway at Gunzenhausen 28 kilometres away and which was opened on 1 July 1859. In 1869, the railway was open all the way from Würzburg to Treuchtlingen and, in 1875, it was joined by the line from Nuremberg, which was extended over the state border to Crailsheim in 1876. In 1903, the Leutershausen-Wiedersbach–Bechhofen railway was opened, whose trains were nicknamed Boggala in the Bechhofen dialect, and usually ran through to Ansbach. However it was closed as early as 28 November 1966.

With the establishment of the Nuremberg Regional Transport Union (Verkehrsverbund Großraum Nürnberg or VGN) the line to Nuremberg was integrated into route R7. After the expansion of the VGN on 1 July 1997 the R7 was extended to Dombühl and the route from Uffenheim to Treuchtlingen added to the network as route R8.

In the summer holidays of 2010, DB Netz closed the north-eastern dead-end platform in Ansbach station between tracks 1 and 1a and rebuilt it. It received a new 140 metre-long and 76 cm-high platform for the Nuremberg S-Bahn. The S-Bahn network was significantly expanded at the timetable change in December 2010.

The VGN extended the S4 by 23 kilometres to Dombühl on 10 December 2017. However, only one in four S-Bahn trains run between Ansbach and Dombühl, running every two hours during the day.

== Traffic ==
=== Rail services ===
The station of Ansbach has seven platforms, including two bay platforms. As a rule the Nuremberg S-Bahn trains to Nuremberg use the 76-cm-high platforms 1 and 25 (called "1a" until 2010). The two 400-metre long island platforms between track 2 and 3 or track 4 and 5 have not yet been modernised and are only 30-cm high. There are hourly connections on the opposite sides of the same platform: towards the east at 10 minutes past the hour between Regional-Express or Intercity trains to Stuttgart on track 2 and RegionalBahn to trains Würzburg on track 3 and towards the west at 50 minutes past the hour between the RB service to Treuchtlingen on track 4 and Regional-Express and Intercity trains to Nuremberg on track 5. Occasionally, trains from the west reverse on tracks 1 or 27 (called track 1b until 2010).

In the 2026 timetable, the following services stop at the station:

Line/ train class	Route	Frequency
IC 61	Leipzig – Naumburg – Jena Paradies – Saalfeld – Lichtenfels – Bamberg – Nuremberg – Ansbach – Aalen – Stuttgart – Karlsruhe	Every 2 hours
ICE 24	Hamburg-Altona – Hamburg – Hannover – Göttingen – Kassel-Wilhelmshöhe – Würzburg – Ansbach – Augsburg – Munich	One train pair
RE 90	Nuremberg – Ansbach – Crailsheim – Schwäbisch Hall-Hessental – Backnang – Stuttgart	Every 2 hours
RB 80	(Munich – Augsburg – Donauwörth –) Treuchtlingen – Gunzenhausen – Ansbach – Würzburg	Hourly
S4	Nürnberg – Roßtal – Ansbach – Dombühl	20/40 minute cycle (every 2 hours to Dombühl)

=== Bus services ===
At the end of the 1990s the station forecourt at Ansbach was refurbished and a central bus station created. Most of the town bus lines stop here as do many regional buses that connect Ansbach to the surrounding area.
