= Bavarian Railway Museum =

Museum in Nördlingen, Bavaria, Germany

Coordinates: 48°51′1″N 10°29′58″E

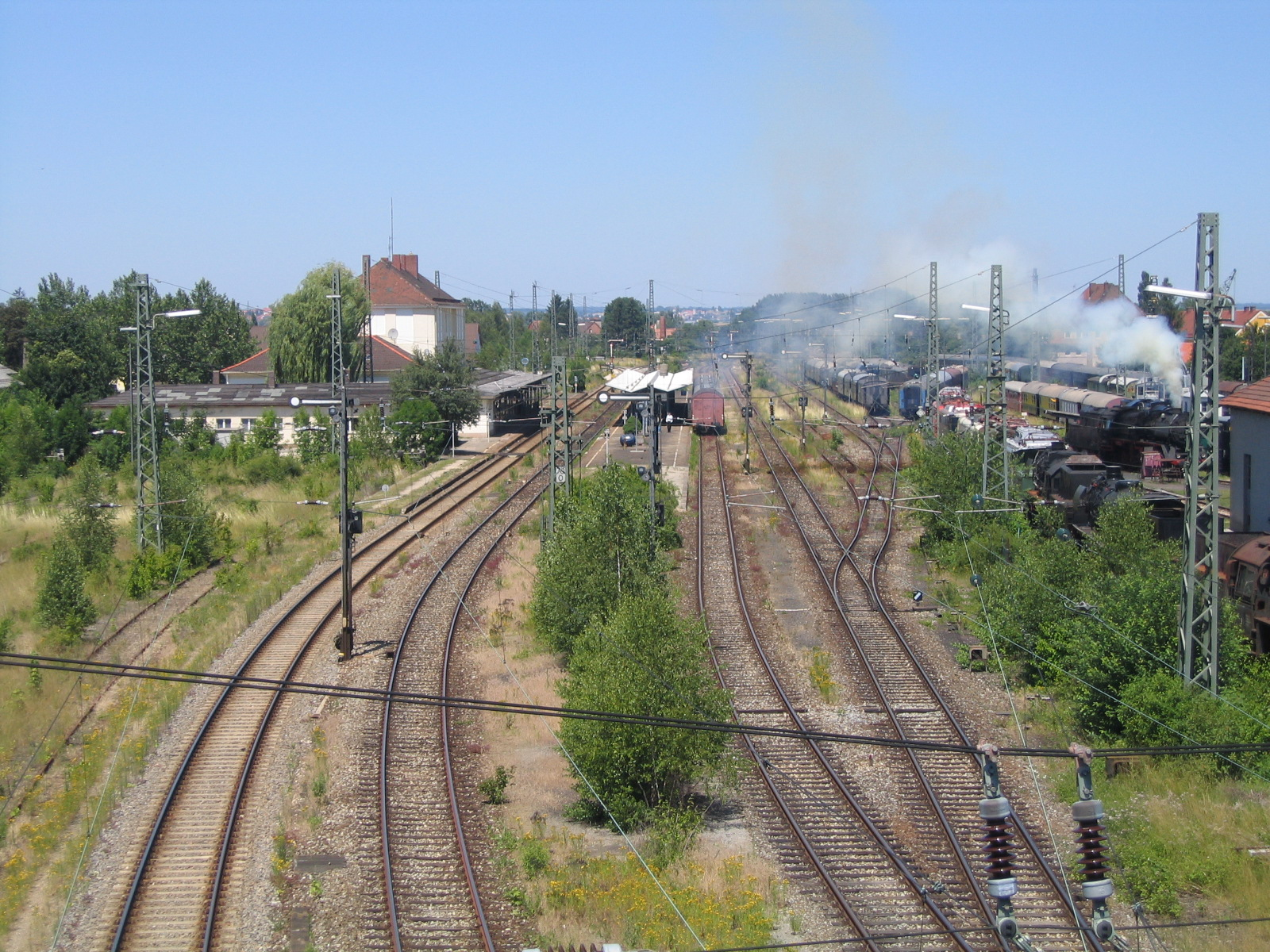
Nördlingen station with the Bavarian Railway Museum depot on the right

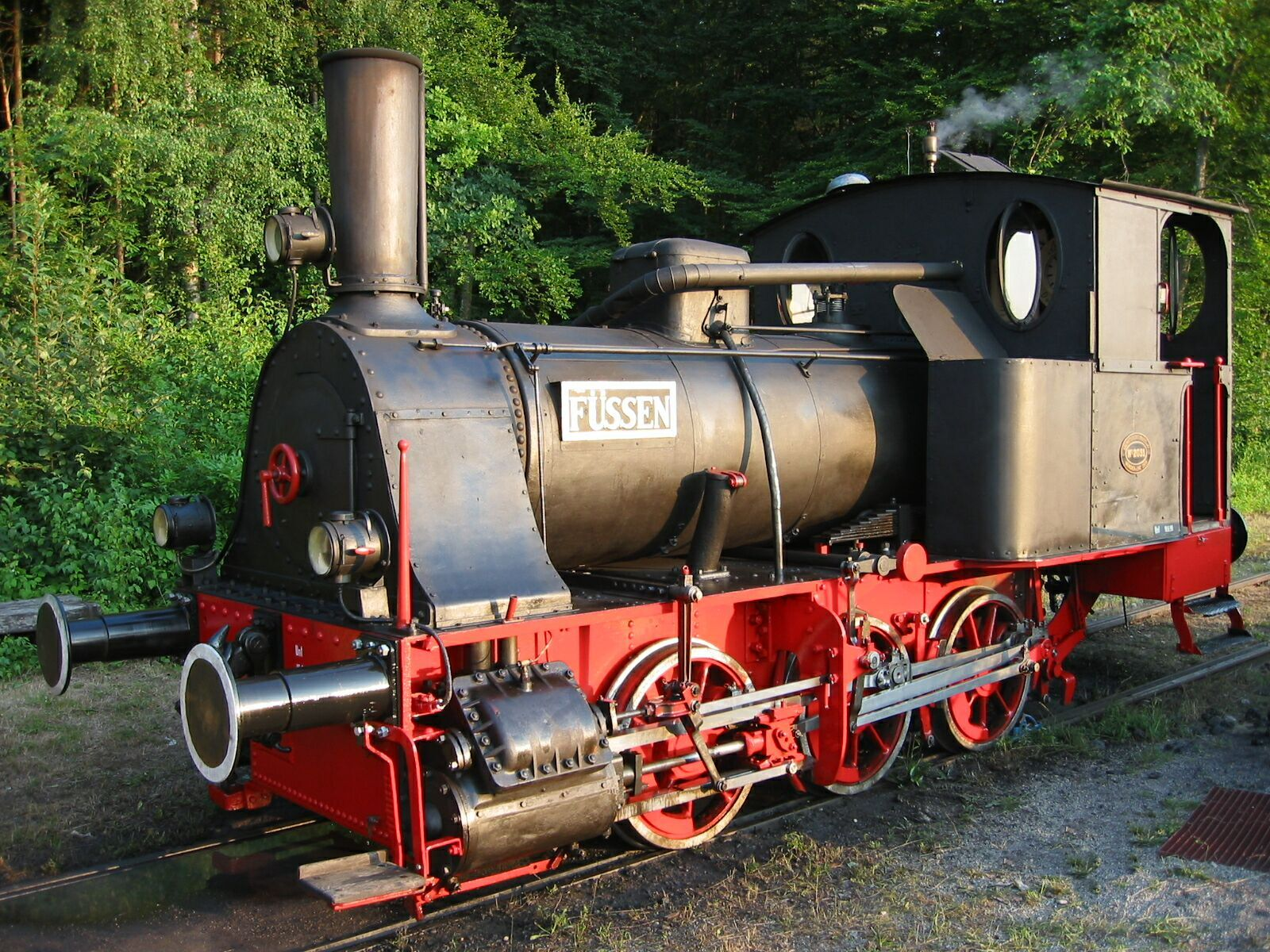
The steam engine Füssen is under way for the BEM

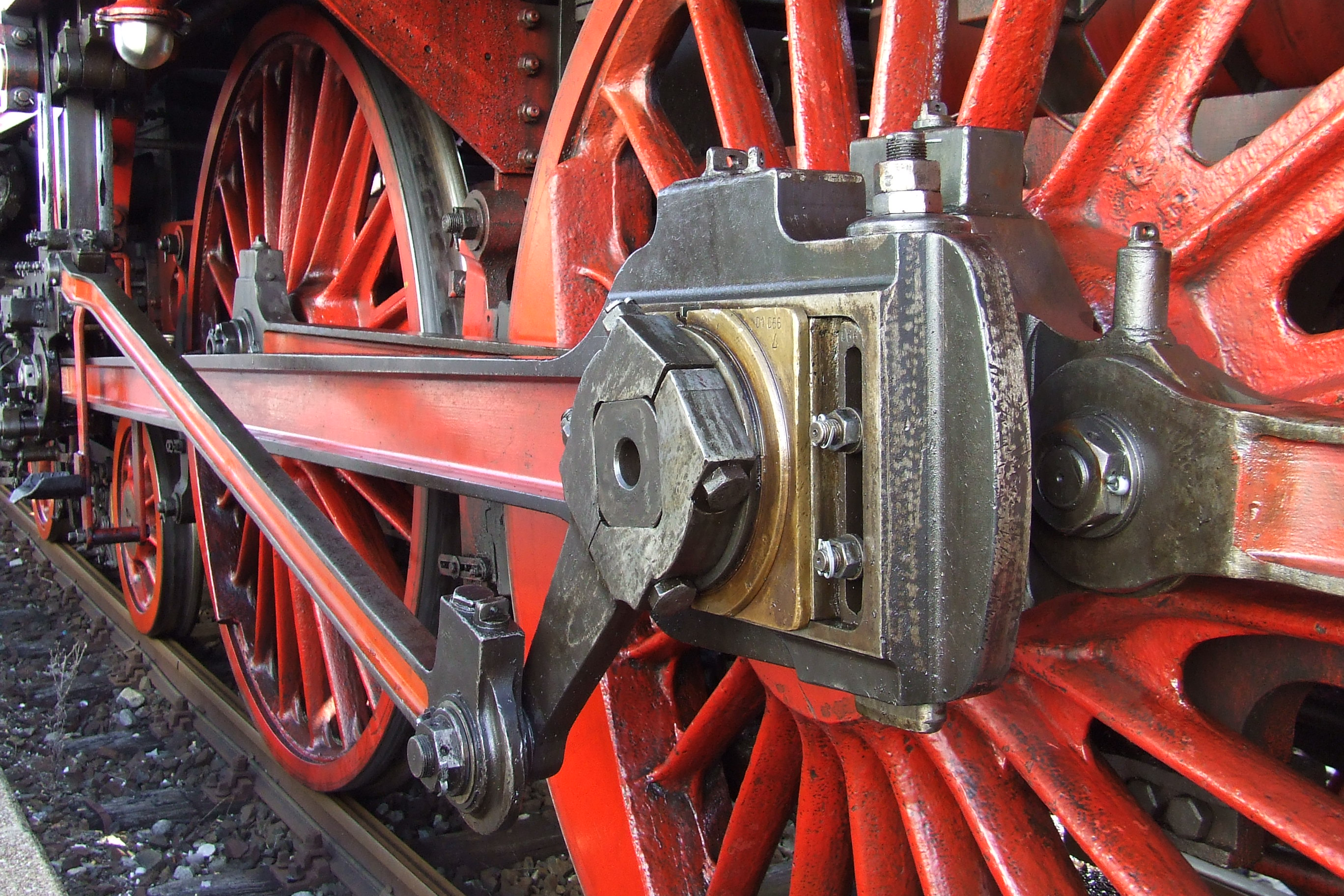
Connecting rod of the museum's steam engine 01 066

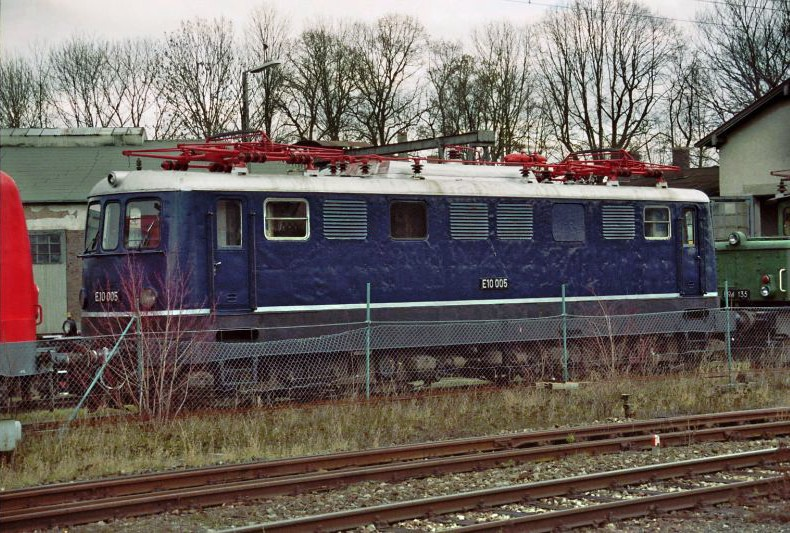
Prototype locomotive E 10 005 of the BEM at Nördlingen

The Bavarian Railway Museum (German: Bayerisches Eisenbahnmuseum, BEM) is a railway museum based in the old locomotive sheds at Nördlingen station in Bavaria, Germany. It is home to more than 100 original railway vehicles and has been located in the depot (Bahnbetriebswerk, Bw) at Nördlingen since 1985.

== History of the locomotive shed ==
The shed, itself, has a long history. As early as 1849, with the construction of the Ludwig South-North Railway from Lindau to Hof, a workshop appeared for the maintenance of steam locomotives and wagons. Wings 2 and 3 of the roundhouse date from this time; since then they have just been extended. The workshop building, too, dates from the 1800s, as well as the floor plan of the first recorded engine shed. The facility was regularly expanded and its use adapted in the course of time up to 1937. The last expansion was carried out from 1935 to 1937, when the locomotive shed was lengthened and a 20-metre turntable installed.

A major event in its history were the air attacks during the Second World War in 1944 and 1945, when large parts of the shed were destroyed. Only wings 2 and 3 of the roundhouse were spared, as well as the workshop building and the water tower. The facility was rebuilt and in places modernised in the years up to 1949.

For a short period the locomotive shed experienced new life as it was allocated V 100 diesel locomotives, VT 98 railbuses and ETA 150 accumulator cars. By 1966 the routine stabling of steam locomotives had ended. With the electrification of the Stuttgart–Nördlingen and the Augsburg–Nördlingen lines between Donauwörth and Aalen, and the Ingolstadt–Neuoffingen railway many of the diesel engines were dispensable, so that in 1982 the locomotive shed was closed as an independent facility. The closure of the branch lines radiating from Nördlingen did one more thing to return peace to the entire station at Nördlingen. In 1985 the railway maintenance division was moved out and operations as a satellite of Augsburg locomotive shed ceased.

== Establishment of the museum ==
In autumn 1985 the Bavarian Railway Museum took over the partially dismantled facilities. Since then, the museum has painstakingly attempted to equip it as a complete locomotive shed again. Several tracks had to be relaid and all the locomotive shed roads connected to the turntable. In addition two water cranes were re-installed. In the near future a coaling facility should also be brought into operation.

== Current museum railway operations ==
The Bavarian Railway Museum works the route to Gunzenhausen and the section from Nördlingen to Feuchtwangen on the line to Dombühl with historical vehicles. Its daughter company, BayernBahn Betriebsgesellschaft mbH, is responsible for the maintenance of the line to Dombühl rented from the Deutsche Bahn as well as the operation of museum vehicles on special trains, but also for other services, for example in maintenance of way trains. In addition, for several years impressive goods trains have been hauled in the Nördlingen area e.g. for wood and timber products. For this Class V 100 und V 60 diesel locomotives are usually used, but sometimes the museum's steam engines are engaged as well.

== See also ==
- History of rail transport in Germany
- Royal Bavarian State Railways
