= Oberdachstetten station =

Railway station in Germany

Oberdachstetten

General information
- Location: Bahnhofstraße 3; 91617 Oberdachstetten; Bavaria; Germany
- Coordinates: 49°25′06″N 10°25′21″E
- Owner: DB Netz
- Operator: DB Station&Service
- Lines: Treuchtlingen–Würzburg railway (KBS 920)
- Platforms: 2 side platforms
- Tracks: 3

Other information
- Station code: 4632
- DS100 code: NON
- IBNR: 8004521
- Category: 6
- Fare zone: VGN: 1823
- Website: www.bahnhof.de

Services
Preceding station		Following station
Burgbernheim-Wildbad towards Würzburg Hbf	RE 80	Ansbach towards München Hbf
Location
- Location within Bavaria

Oberdachstetten station is a railway station in the municipality of Oberdachstetten, located in the district of Ansbach in Middle Franconia, Germany.
