= DB Class ETA 150 =

DB Class ETA/ESA 150 DB Class 515/815
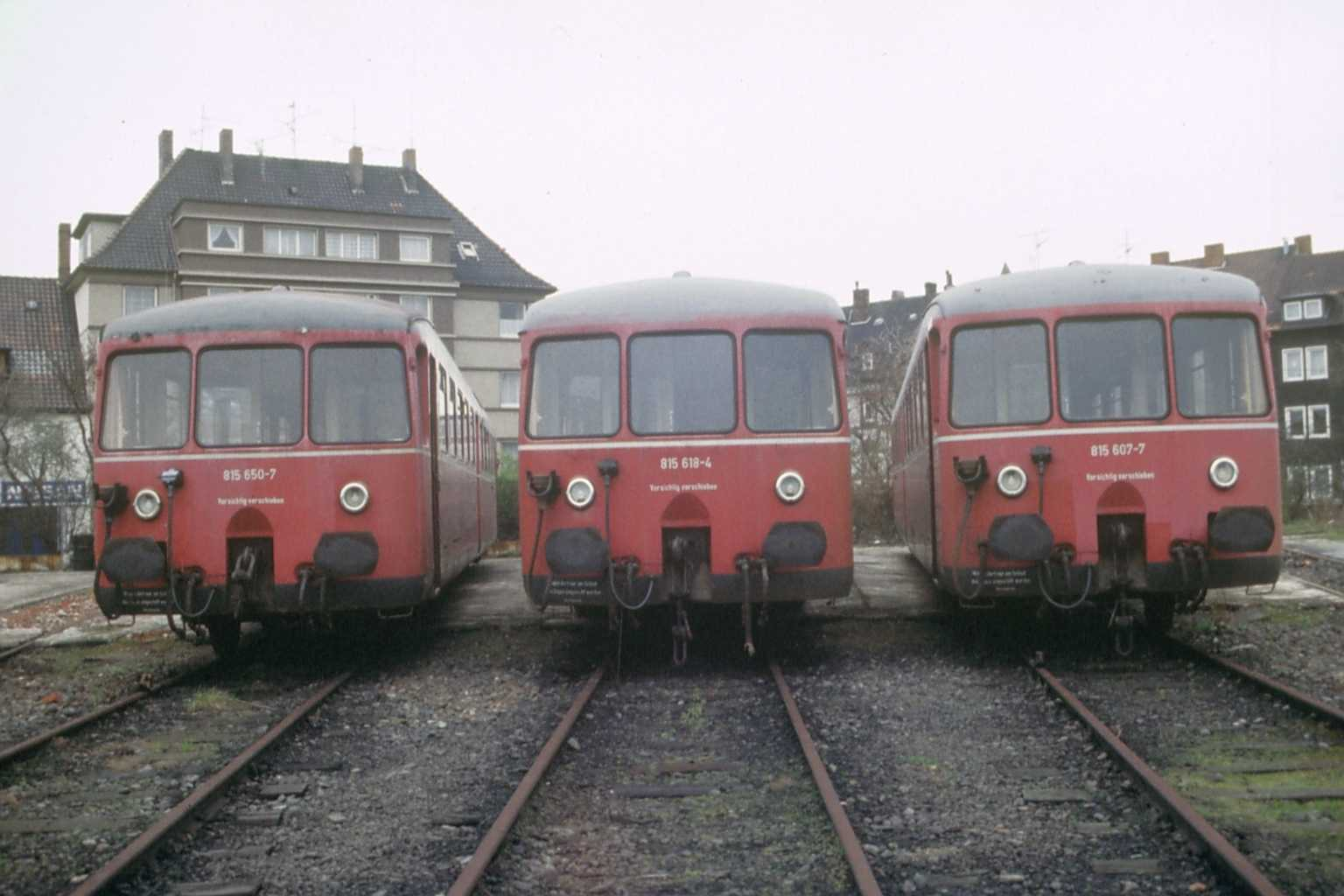
- Three 515/815 railcars at Betriebswerk Hildesheim
- In service: 1955–1995
- Manufacturers: SSW; Rathgeber (7); O&K (150); WMD (56); MAN (19); Wegmann & Co.
- Constructed: 1954-1965
- Number built: 232 power cars; 216 driving trailers
- Fleet numbers: ETA 515 001–033; ETA 515 101–138; ETA 515 501–661; ESA 150 001–216

Specifications
- Car length: ETA: 26.8 m (87 ft 11 1/8 in); ESA: 26.8 m (87 ft 11 1/8 in)
- Width: 2,920 mm (9 ft 7 in)
- Height: 3,513 or 3,534 mm (11 ft 6 5/16 in or 11 ft 7 1/8 in)
- Wheel diameter: 0.950 m (37 3/8 in)
- Maximum speed: 100 km/h (62 mph)
- Weight: ETA (empty): 49.0–56.0 t (48.2–55.1 long tons; 54.0–61.7 short tons)
- Power output: 2× 150 kW (200 hp) = 300 kW (400 hp)
- Power supply: Batteries: 352–548 kWh (1,270–1,970 MJ)
- UIC classification: Bo'2'(ETA) and 2'2'(ESA)
- Braking system: Knorr
- Seating: ETA:59–86; ESA: 81–100
- Track gauge: 1,435 mm (4 ft 8 1/2 in)

The accumulator cars of Class ETA 150 (Class 515 from 1968) were German railcars used extensively by Deutsche Bundesbahn (DB) for 40 years. They ran on both main and branch lines. By comparison with the Uerdingen railbus, the railcars were quieter (despite the typical whine of their DC motors), rode more smoothly on the rails owing to the weight of the batteries, and were pollution-free (no smoke or fumes).

They were very popular with passengers, who nicknamed them Akkublitz (Battery Lightning), Säurebomber (Acid Bombers), Steckdosen-InterCity (Socket InterCitys), Taschenlampen-Express (Pocket Torch Express), or Biene Maja (Maya the Bee – because of the sound they made when at speed).

== History ==
As a result of many years of favourable experience with this type of vehicle (the Prussian state railways had placed accumulator railcars in service as early as 1907 – these would later become Deutsche Reichsbahn's Class ETA 178) and an evaluation of the results obtained from the use of Class ETA 176 prototypes, DB placed 232 Class ETA 150 power cars and 216 of their associated Class ESA 150 driving trailers in service between 1953 and 1965.

DB preferred to employ these two-coach sets on relatively level routes. They were rarely used on hilly lines owing to the resultant high current consumption and hence limited range. In the main this affected only those vehicles stationed at Wanne-Eickel and used in the Wuppertal area.

The main areas of operation of the class, apart from the Ruhrgebiet, were Schleswig-Holstein, eastern Lower Saxony, eastern Rhineland-Palatinate (in the Westerwald forest), south Hesse, south Baden, and the region around Augsburg and Nördlingen. The last few railcars also worked in the area of the Rhine-Ruhr Transport Union (Verkehrsverbund Rhein-Ruhr) or VRR until 1995.

Between 1978 and 1988 the railcars also worked between Aachen and Maastricht in the Netherlands.

In 1968, under DB's renumbering scheme, the power cars became Class 515, and the driving trailers Class 815.

Compared to the Prussian Wittfeld accumulator cars, the ETA 150s had an unfavourable weight distribution − the batteries were located in the middle of the coach body instead of over the end axles, so that in their last years in service the frames tended to sag in the middle, which resulted in the vehicles' acquiring the nickname Hängebauchschweine (Pot-bellied pigs).

== Variants ==
=== Batches ===
- 515.0, 1954–1956; battery capacity: 352-437 kWh
- 515.1, 1956–1958; battery capacity: 390-437 kWh
- 515.5, 1959-1965: battery capacity: 520-603 kWh

=== Passenger compartments ===
The first batch had a high proportion of 1st class seating; this was changed for the second batch, the number of 1st class seats being reduced to just eight. All ETAs had a luggage compartment. The original 2+3 seat layout was changed in the later batches to a 2+2 configuration.

- 515 003–033
- 515 101–112, 120-138 (Hamburg variant)
- 515 113-119 (Bremen variant)
- 515 501–508, 639–651
- 515 509–580, 604–638, 652–661

=== Livery variations ===
The twin-car sets were delivered in a wine-red livery. From 1975 some were repainted in beige and ocean-blue. Shortly before their retirement a few vehicles were painted in DB's paint scheme at that time – white and peppermint green – and ran in this livery on the Nokia Railway (today the Glückauf Railway) from Bochum Hbf to Gelsenkirchen Hbf.

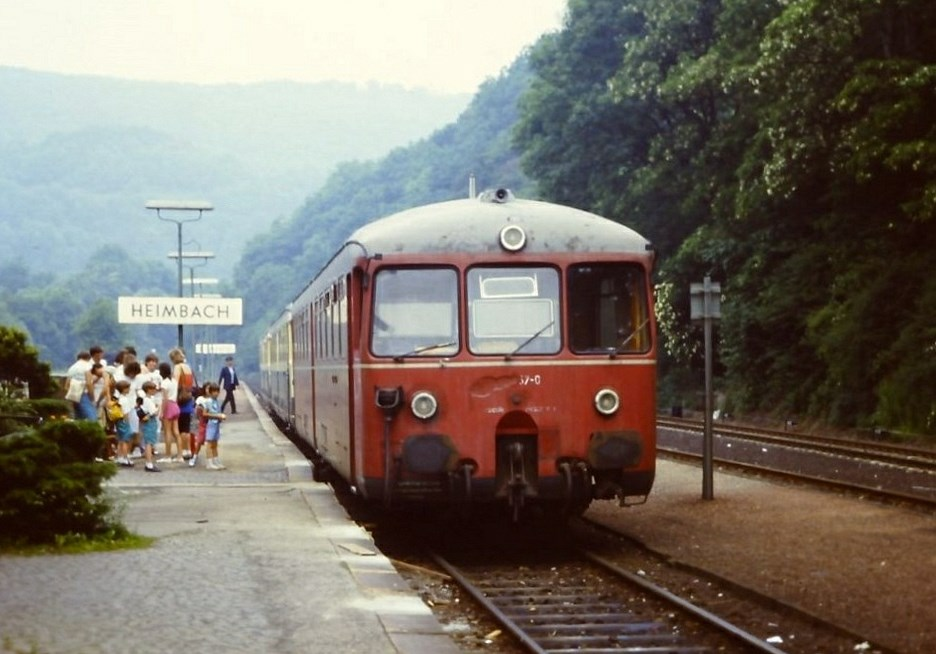
515 in red

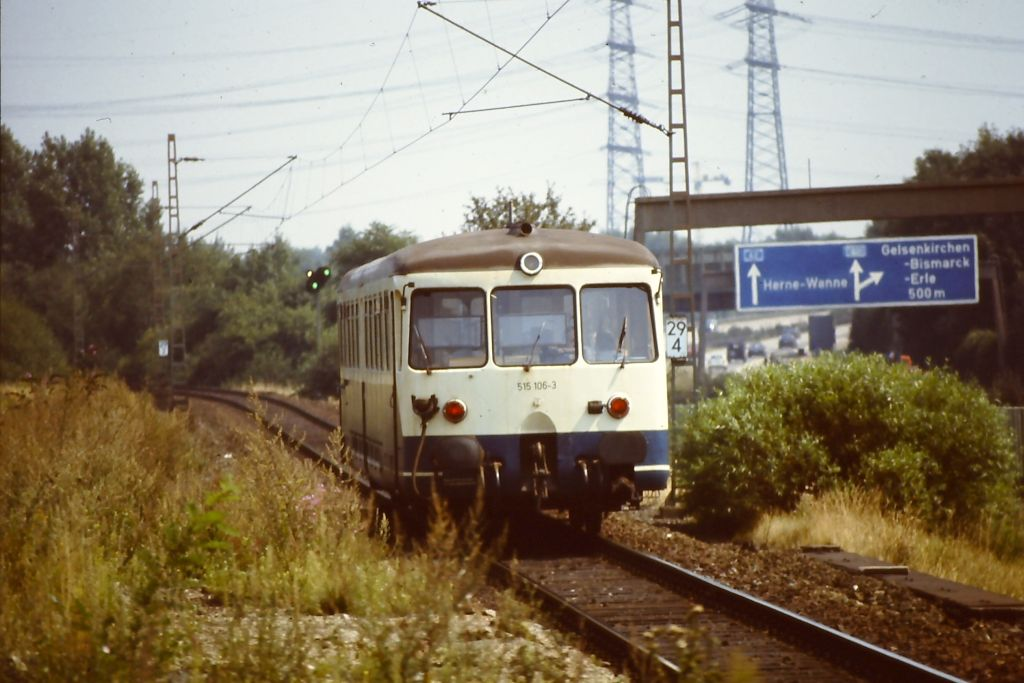
515 in ocean-blue/beige

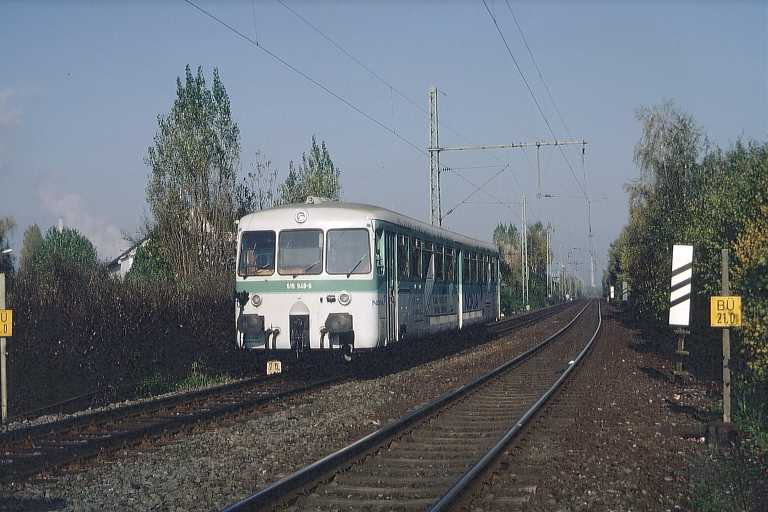
515 in peppermint green/white

== Preserved ==
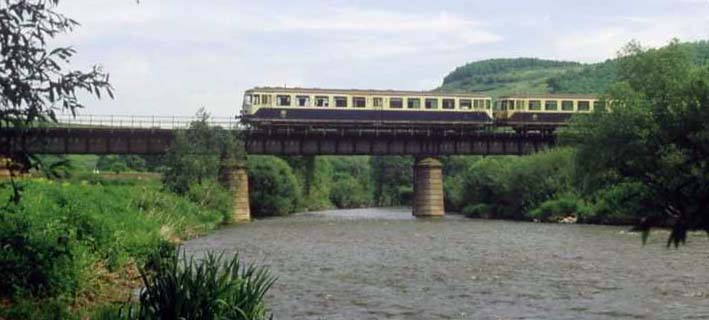
515 + 815 on the Nahe bridge at Staudernheim

Two power cars were sold to the Regentalbahn (private railway), who converted them to diesel cars and designated them as Class VT 515-U.

Only a few vehicles could be preserved by museum railways because their maintenance is extremely difficult now that the maintenance of batteries at Limburg has ceased and the vehicles are required to go to charging stations. The maintenance and operation of normal railbuses is considerably easier. Number 515 556 is operational, but until it undergoes a general inspection it can only be used on the (museum) site of the locomotive depot.

The following have been preserved:

- 515 556-9 and 815 672-1 (Bochum-Dahlhausen Railway Museum)
- 515 011-5 (Bavarian Railway Museum at Nördlingen)
