= Nördlingen–Pleinfeld railway =

Railway in Bavaria, Germany

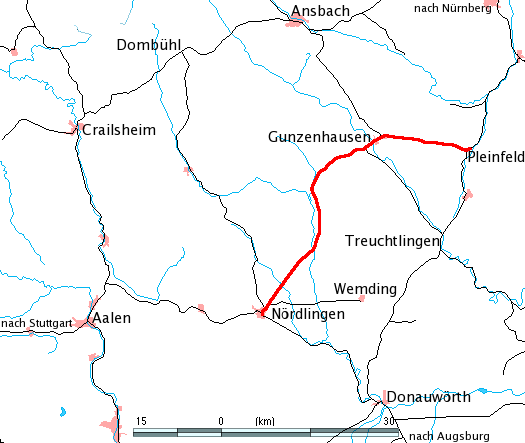

Overview
- Line number: 912, 12990

Service
- Route number: 5330

Technical
- Line length: 56.164 km (34.899 mi)
- Track gauge: 1,435 mm (4 ft 8 1/2 in) standard gauge
- Minimum radius: 400 m (1,300 ft)
- Maximum incline: 0.56%

The Nördlingen–Pleinfeld railway is a railway line in Bavaria, Germany that was originally built and operated as part of the Ludwig South-North Railway. It runs in southern Middle Franconia and in northern Swabia from Nördlingen via Gunzenhausen to Pleinfeld and opens up the southern Franconian Lake District (Fränkischen Seenland), the Hesselberg region and parts of the Nördlinger Ries.

The 16.8-kilometre-long Gunzenhausen–Pleinfeld section, sometimes referred to as the Seenland-Bahn ("Lakeland railway"), is a main railway and is served by a regional railway line for passenger services operated by Verkehrsverbund Großraum Nürnberg (Nuremberg Region Transport Association, VGN). On the 39.5 km long branch line section from Nördlingen to Gunzenhausen, on the other hand, there is now a heritage railway, operated with a passenger train that is known as the Seenland-Express ("Lakeland Express") after the Franconian Lake District (Fränkischen Seenland). There are plans for a permanent reactivation of passenger traffic on the whole route. Along with the Nördlingen–Dombühl railway, the Nördlingen–Gunzenhausen section is also known as the Hesselbergbahn ("Hesselberg Railway").

== History ==
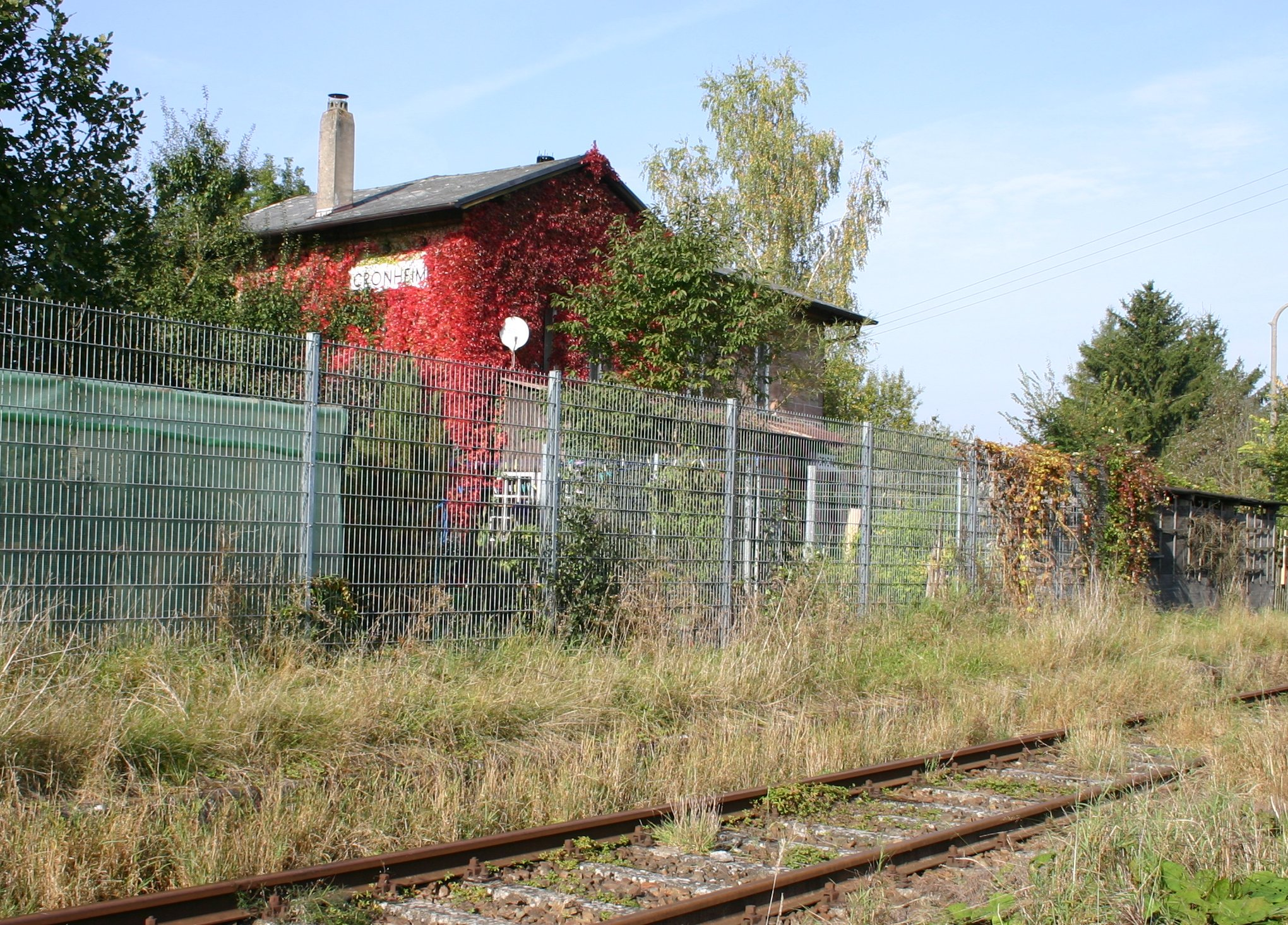
Cronheim station in 2006

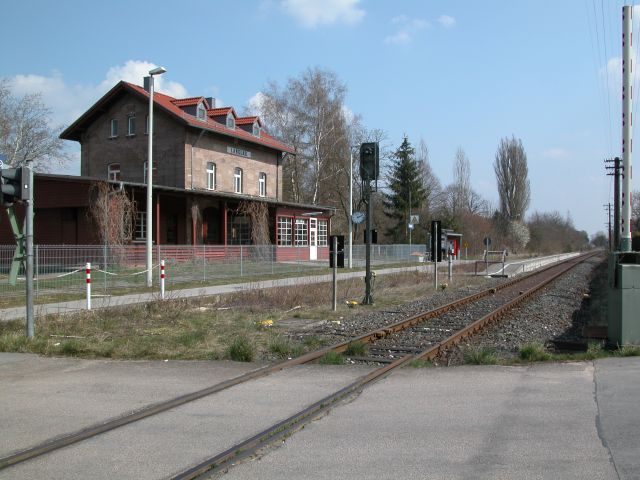
Langlau station in 2007

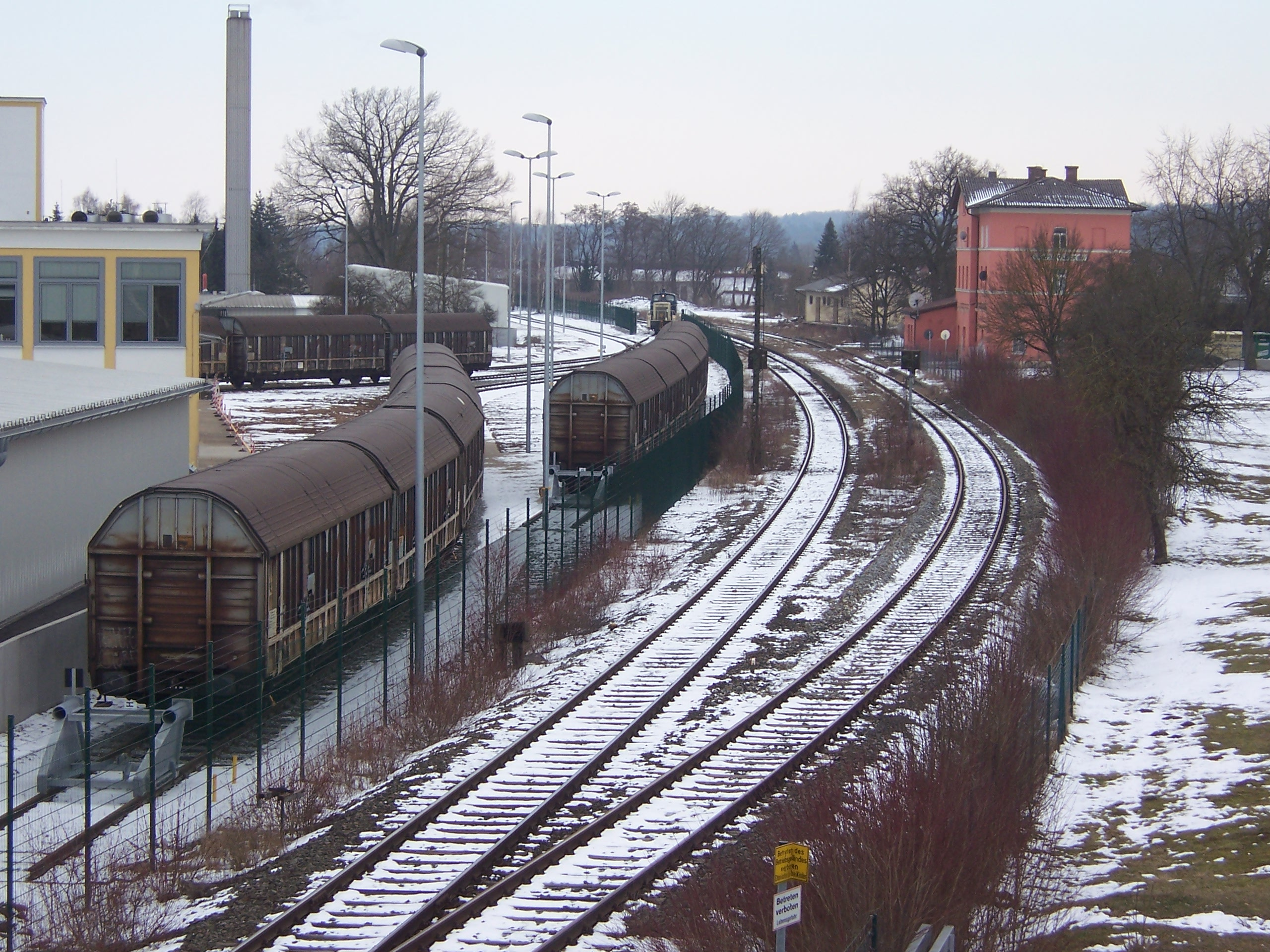
Wassertrüdingen station

The line was opened in 1849 by the Royal Bavarian State Railways as part of the Ludwig South-North Railway after the planned route via Gunzenhausen, Spalt and Georgensgmünd was not built due to objections from the hops farmers from Spalt, who were concerned about effects on the quality of their products. With the opening of the Donauwörth–Treuchtlingen railway in 1906, the Nördlingen–Pleinfeld line became less important. Traffic kept falling.

On 29 September 1985, Deutsche Bundesbahn (DB) closed passenger services on the section from Nördlingen to Gunzenhausen. It closed freight services on the line on 1 August 1995 (Wassertrüdingen–Gunzenhausen) and 1 June 1997 (Nördlingen–Wassertrüdingen). Only passenger traffic between Pleinfeld and Gunzenhausen remained.

In 1999, the Bavarian Railways Operating Company (BayernBahn Betriebsgesellschaft), a subsidiary of the Bavarian Railway Museum (Bayerische Eisenbahnmuseum, BEM), contracted a long-term lease of the Nördlingen–Gunzenhausen section from DB. On 8 June 2003 the BEM started museum operations on the whole line. Since the line can be operated profitably, BayernBahn bought it from DB Netz at the end of 2017.

In May 2019, the Donau-Rieser district parliamentary groups of the SPD, Greens and Frauenliste/ödp/Freie Wahler started a joint online petition on the OpenPetition online portal demanding the reactivation of the line. As of April 2022, the authority responsible for Bavarian rail passenger transport, the Bayerische Eisenbahngesellschaft, lists the Hesselbergbahn between Wassertrüdingen and Gunzenhausen as an extension of the RB 62 service from Pleinfeld as a planned reactivation in its allocation calendar. The Bavarian State Ministry for Housing, Construction and Transport assumed in April 2023 that local rail passenger services would resume in December 2024.

Langlau station is to be upgraded to allow train crossings again and will receive an electronic signal box. For this purpose, in-depth planning services were tendered in August 2022. The start of construction was scheduled for 2023 and commissioning for November 2024.

== Operations ==
The line has been integrated in the Nuremberg Regional Transport Association (Verkehrsverbund Großraum Nürnberg, VGN) since 27 September 1992. It is currently operated as line RB 62. Train traffic today is mainly handled by Siemens Desiro (class 642) multiples units, with some Alstom Coradia LINT 41 (class 648) trains also being used. Service is hourly from Monday to Friday and every two hours on weekends. According to the Bavarian State Government's concept for more electric mobility on the rails in Bavaria, Interior Minister Joachim Herrmann redesigned the route of the Seenland Railway from Bavarian Proposed as a pilot project for operation with catenary/battery hybrid vehicles. The town of Gunzenhausen's request to set up another station in Frickenfelden as part of the upgrading of the entire route was rejected.

In mid-December 2015, Bayerische Eisenbahngesellschaft ("Bavarian Railway Company", BEG) announced that it would award transport services in the Nuremberg diesel network to DB Regio again. The formal award would take place on 4 January 2016. The Pleinfeld–Gunzenhausen line would be integrated when it was expected to be returned to operation in June 2019. According to BEG, the trains that commute between Pleinfeld and Gunzenhausen were to be extended to Wassertrüdingen as soon as the districts of Ansbach and Weißenburg-Gunzenhausen could present a viable infrastructure concept. The contract runs until June 2031. After winning the tender, the rollingstock previously used were rebuilt.

From February 2022 to May 2022, a Talent 3 battery powered rail car was used in trial operation on the weekends.

=== Nördlingen–Gunzenhausen section ===
On a few days each year, the Bavarian Railway Museum operates passenger services hauled by steam locomotives.

Since October 2004, freight services have operated on the line connecting the factory of the cosmetics company, Schwarzkopf, in Wassertrüdingen with Nördlingen. Twice a week Bavarian Railways operates tank wagons carrying industrial alcohol. Since 7 January 2010 Bavarian Railways runs trains every day with finished products to Langenfeld, Rhineland; the rest of the line to the central warehouse of the Henkel Group in Monheim am Rhein is operated by Bahnen der Stadt Monheim ("Monheim municipal railways"). All these freight services run over the section of the line between Wassertrüdingen and Gunzenhausen.
