= Water crane =

Device for providing a locomotive with water

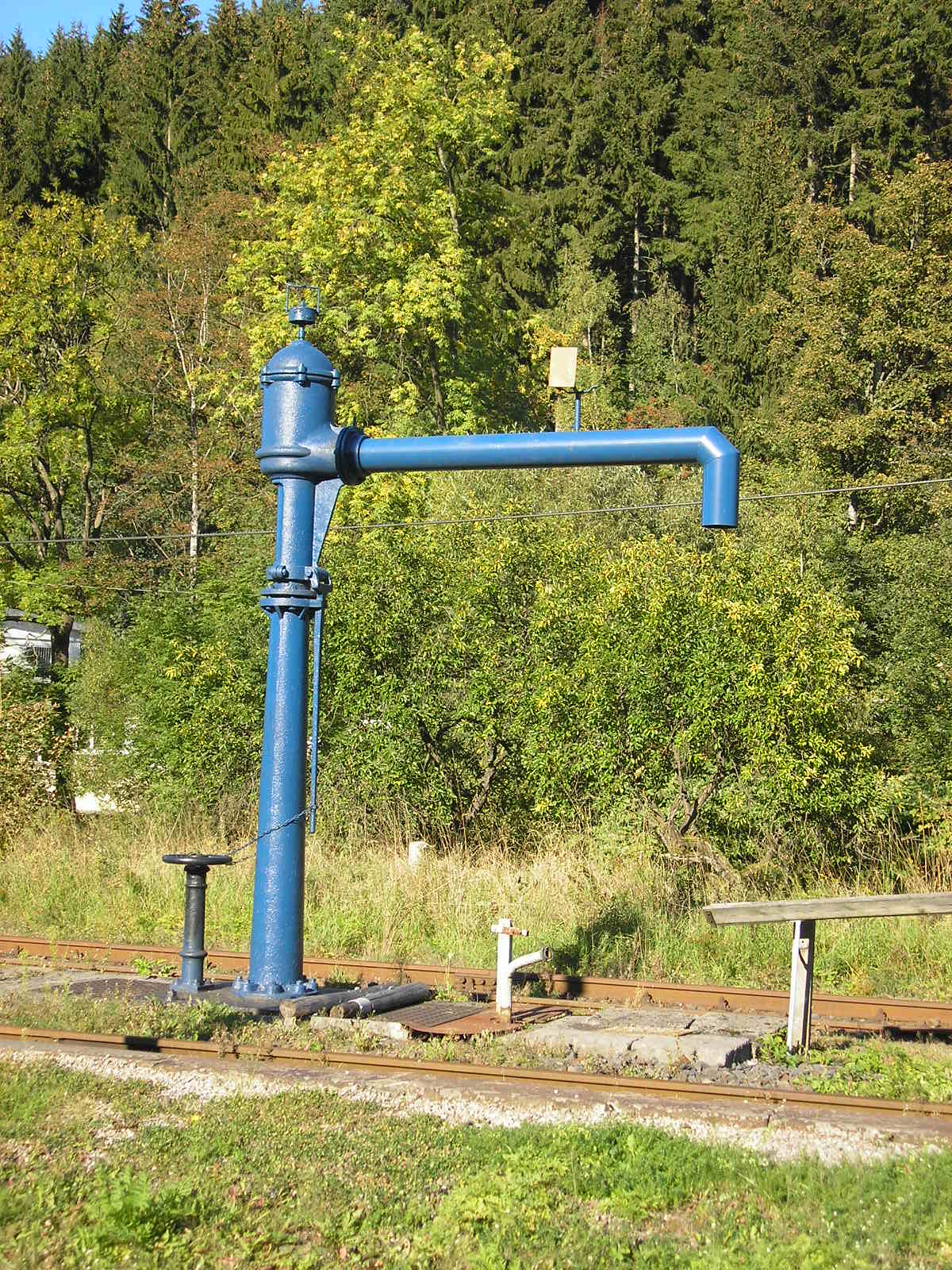
Water crane in Stützerbach, Germany

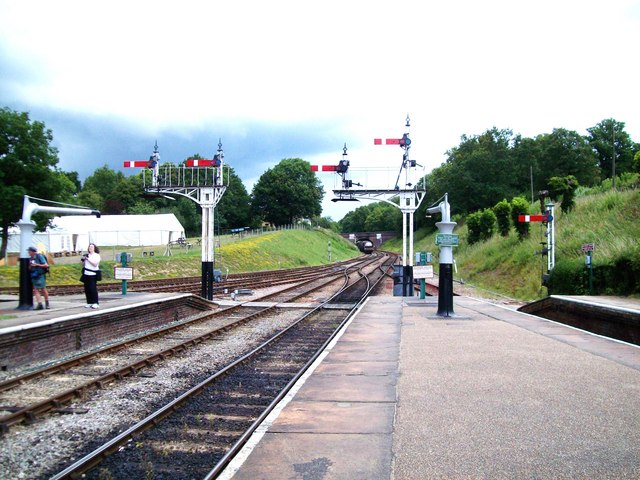
Signals and water cranes at Horsted Keynes station on the Bluebell Railway

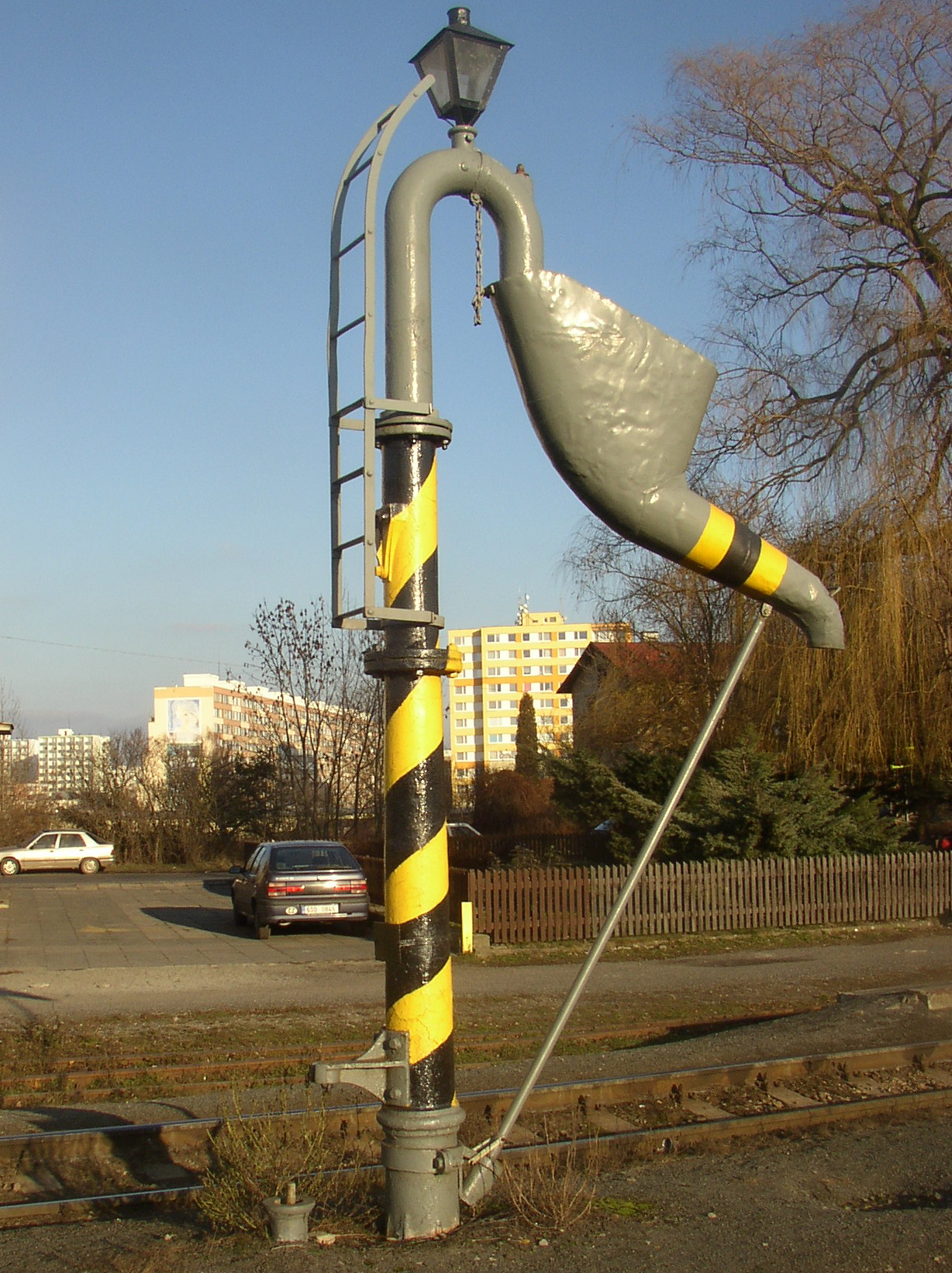
Water crane in Kladno, Czech Republic

A water crane is a device used for delivering a large volume of water into the tank or tender of a steam locomotive. The device is also called a water column in the United States and Australia. As a steam locomotive consumes large quantities of water, water cranes were a vital part of railway station equipment, often situated at the end of a platform so that water could be refilled during a stop at the station.

== Overview ==
Generally, water cranes consist of an upright steel pipe about 8 to 12 inches (0.20 to 0.30 m) in diameter with a horizontal, pivoting pipe connected to its upper end so as to form a swinging arm. The swinging arm is usually designed to rest parallel to the rails when not in use. Water cranes may be able to deliver up to ten cubic metres (2,600 US gallons) of water per minute.

== Water supply ==
In hilly country, natural streams can be dammed and water fed by gravity to the water crane. In flatter country this arrangement is not always possible, so water may be supplied by a tank next to the crane. Water tanks may vary in volume from 190 cubic metres (50,000 US gal) to greater than 757 cubic metres (200,000 US gal). In some cases a well may be used to supply the water to the tank.

Depending on the quality of the water under supply, it may need to be treated chemically to eliminate hardness which induces scale buildup on the inside of the locomotive boiler. The scale which builds up on heat transfer surfaces forms a layer of insulation between the metal of the firebox and the boiler water. This causes metal to overheat or corrode and eventually fail.

== See also ==
- Water stop
- Track pan (US) (water trough (UK))
