= Ludwig South-North Railway =

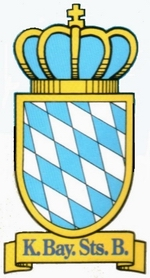
Insignia of the Royal Bavarian State Railways.

The Ludwig South–North Railway (Ludwig-Süd-Nord-Bahn), built between 1843 and 1854, was the first railway line to be constructed by Royal Bavarian State Railways. It was named after the king, Ludwig I, whose infrastructure priorities had earlier been focused less on railway development than on his Main-Danube canal project.

The railway ran from Lindau on Lake Constance via Kempten, Augsburg, Nuremberg and Bamberg to Hof where it linked up with the Saxon-Bavarian Railway Company.

== Background ==
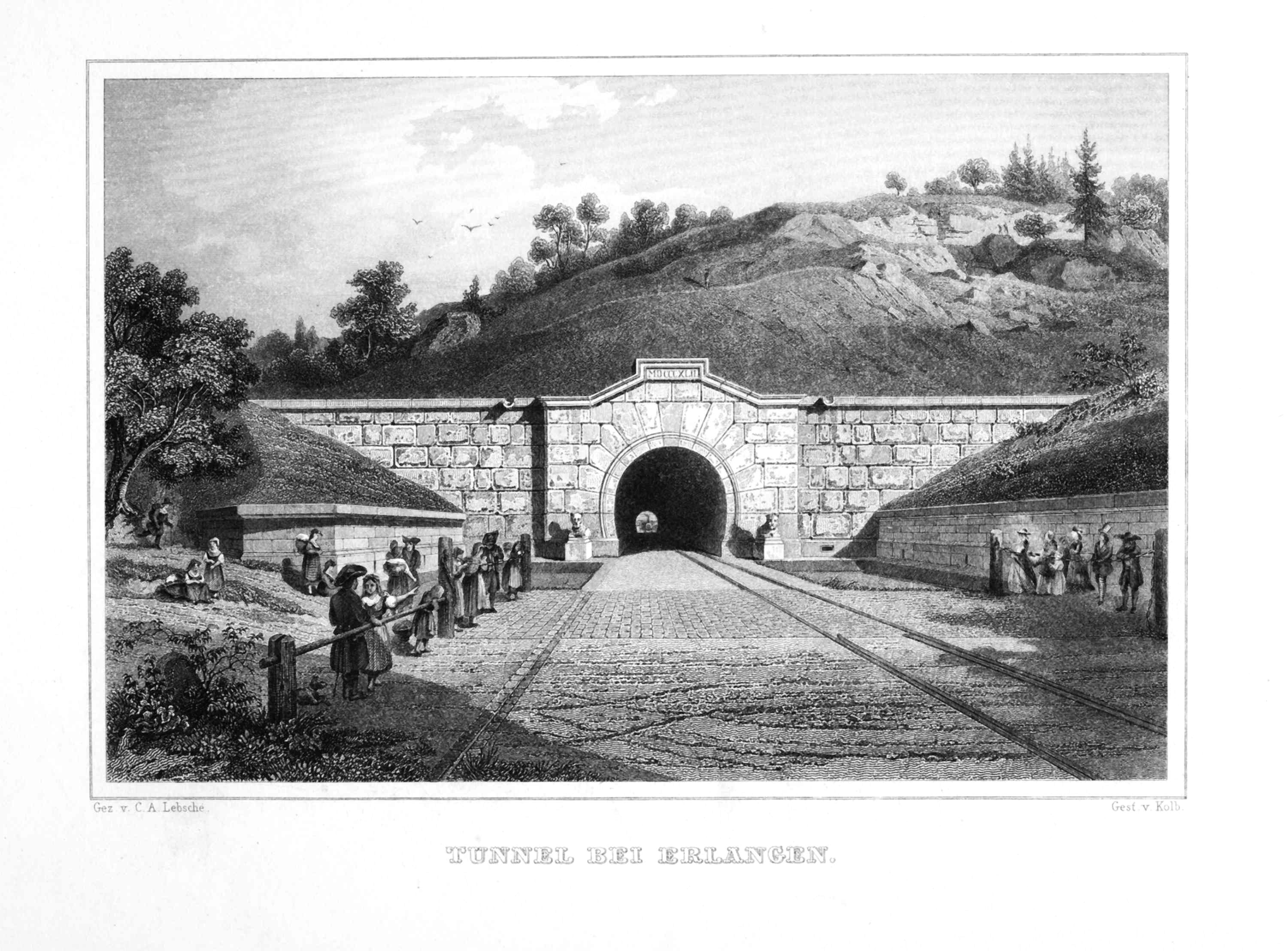
The railway tunnel at Erlangen recorded by Carl August Lebschée

Following the successful experiment involving the construction of a railway connecting Munich to Augsburg, which had opened on 4 October 1840, committees sprang up in many parts of Bavaria to plan private railways. The government determined that the building of further railways should become a state responsibility, however. On 14 January 1841 Bavaria concluded with Saxony and Saxe-Altenburg an agreement to build a railway connecting Leipzig with Nuremberg, which would cross into Bavaria at Hof. The parties committed to have the railway ready for operation within six years.

The Bavarian government decided to extend the railway past Augsburg (already connected by rail to Munich, the capital city) through the Allgäu as far as Lake Constance. The necessary legislation was passed in Munich on 25 August 1843. With a budgeted cost of 51.5 million Guilders, it was planned that the entire length would be ready within ten years. The section between Augsburg and Hof would account for 33 million guilders. Space for two tracks would be prepared, but initially only a single track would be laid. Responsibility for the construction would be given to chief engineer, August Pauli and, initially, the French-born railroad pioneer Paul Camille von Denis, though Denis had been taken off the project in 1842 in order to take over the construction of a line connecting Ludwigshafen (at the time also ruled by Bavaria) with Saarbrücken (subsequently named the Palatine Ludwig Railway (Pfälzische Ludwigsbahn).

== Construction and subsequent development ==
=== Northern section – Hof to Nuremberg ===
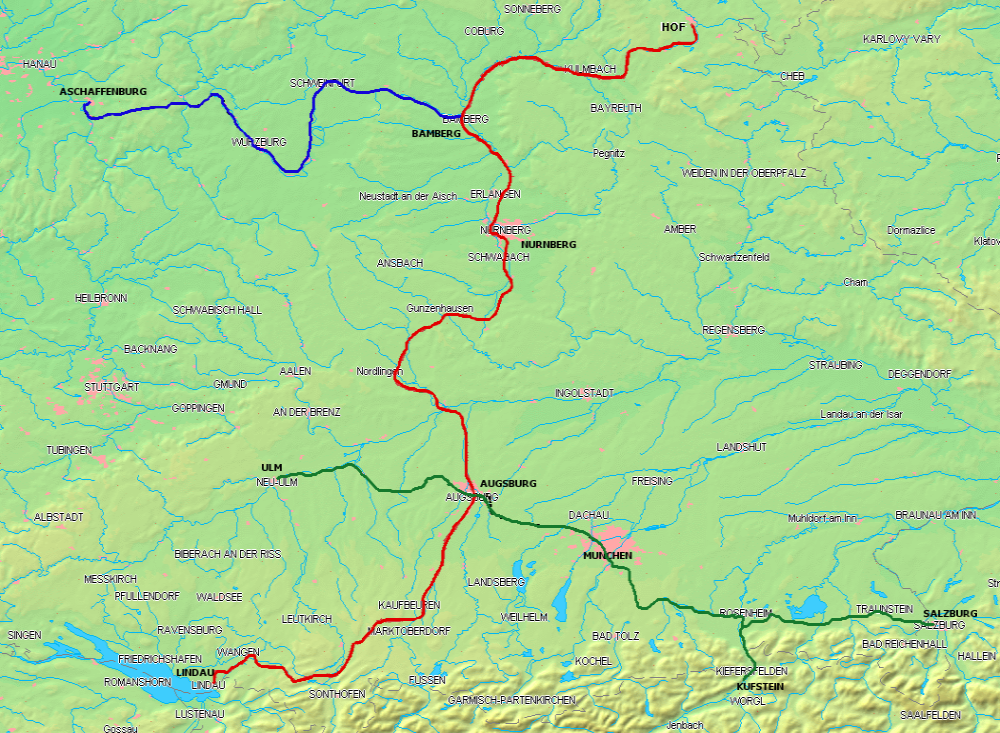
The three Bavarian main lines with the Ludwig South-North Railway in red

The privately owned Saxony-Bavaria Railway Company, in which the governments of Saxony and Saxe-Altenburg held a minority stake, started work on the Saxon end of the railway line in 1841.

In Bavaria, following the establishment in 1841 of the Nuremberg-based Royal Railway Building Commission, work began on ground preparation in 1842, but due to topographical challenges of the kind familiar to later generations of railway builders, serious construction began only in 1843. Sometimes-conflicting objectives included the avoidance of over-steep sections while nonetheless connecting as many towns and cities as possible with the railway. Nevertheless, on the slopes of the Fichtel Mountains between Neuenmarkt and Wirsberg, the route incorporates a stretch with an average gradient of 23‰.

The first stretch of line, between Nuremberg and Bamberg, was opened to passengers in October 1844. The full 203 kilometers of the northern section were opened in five successive stages, the fifth, between Hof and the frontier with Saxony, opening in November 1848. A celebration of the opening of the first sections of the line took place at Nuremberg on 25 August 1848, which was the king's birthday, by when the line already extended north as far as Neuenmarkt.

Although the Bavarian part of the project had overshot the agreed six-year time line, it was still ready ahead of the Saxon part, full opening of which was delayed by topographical challenges until 1851.

To the north of Nuremberg, at Erlangen where the line ran parallel to the Ludwigs canal (the Rhine-Main-Danube canal of that time), the railway incorporated the 306-meter-long Burgberg tunnel, Bavaria's oldest railway tunnel.

From 1852 there was a connection at Bamberg with the new Ludwig's Western Railway towards Würzburg, Aschaffenburg and, by 1854, the Hessean frontier at Kahl.

After the unification of Germany in 1870, Hof ceased to be a frontier town and the line became a significant component of the national rail network. Between 1862 and 1892, the opportunity was taken to install a second track, for which space had already been allowed at the time of the original construction: by 1939 electrification had been completed from Nuremberg as far as Bamberg. In 1945, however, following the Second World War, Germany was partitioned, with Bavaria in the US occupation zone (which subsequently became part of West Germany and Saxony in the Soviet occupation zone (which subsequently became East Germany). The line lost importance. In the 1960s, over a ten-kilometer section between Marktschorgast and Stammbach, the second track was removed since the level of traffic had become too low to justify maintenance of a parallel track over this mountain section.

The railway's decline was reversed with the unification of the two post-war German states: since 1990 the line has recovered much of its former importance. The route of the northern section of the Ludwig South–north railway has changed little since 1848.

=== Centre Section Nuremberg to Augsburg ===
Work had also started on the central section in 1843, and the first section, between Oberhausen and Nordheim (now a district of Donauwörth) was opened in November 1844. By the end of 1849 the entire middle section had been completed. The capital was linked in to the national rail network on 1 June 1846 when the Munich–Augsburg railway found itself nationalised in return for a shareholder compensation payment of 4.4 Million Guilders.

The section ran relatively indirectly between Nurmenburg and Augsburg, partly for topographical reason and partly because it was hoped this would facilitate an interchange at Nördlingen with the Royal Württemberg State Railways, an aspiration that would be fulfilled from the Württemberg side of the frontier only in 1861.

At Donauwörth the line included Bavaria's second oldest tunnel, although the 125 meter long tunnel would become redundant for its original purpose after 1870 when the route round Donauwörth was changed. Today the south-eastern end of the tunnel, which lies directly beyond the site of the former station, has been converted for warehousing and residential uses.

Section of line	Length	Opened
Oberhausen–Nordheim	36.3 km	20 November 1844
Augsburg–Oberhausen	2.5 km	1 July 1847
Nordheim–Donauwörth	2.0 km	15 September 1847
Schwabach–Nuremberg	15.0 km	1 April 1849
Donauwörth–Oettingen	42.4 km	15 May 1849
Oettingen–Gunzenhausen	26.5 km	20 August 1849
Gunzenhausen–Schwabach	45.5 km	1 October 1849

=== Southern Section Augsburg to Lindau ===
Before the southern portion of the railway had been completed, work had already begun in Augsburg on the Maximilian Railway (Bayerischen Maximiliansbahn) which would run westwards towards Neu-Ulm and the frontier with Württemberg. The landscape to the west of Augsburg was less challenging than the route to the south, and the line towards Ulm could already be opened as far as Dinkelscherben on 26 September 1853.

By 1852 the Ludwig South–north railway extended as far south a Kempten where a large timber bridge, the King Louis Bridge, built for two tracks carried it over the River Iller. The bridge would be replaced by a concrete structure, but not before 1906. Just 7 kilometers further along the line towards Immenstadt, at Waltenhofen, came another large timber bridge. This 53 meter long structure would be replaced by a steel bridge in 1900. Between Immenstadt and Lindau the line follows two difficult mountain passes in order to avoid Württemberg, at that time still a foreign state. The final 1.8 kilometers, opened early in 1854, ran along the wall protecting the town from Lake Constance.

The entire route having been completed on 1 March 1854, 566 kilometers of line with space for two tracks had been completed in less than eleven years: this represented a remarkable achievement in view of the resources then available.

== Commissioning progress ==
Section	Length	in Service
Northern		
Nürnberg–Bamberg	62.4 km	1 September 1844 Goods Traffic; 1 October 1844 Passenger Traffic
Bamberg–Lichtenfels	31.9 km	15 February 1846
Lichtenfels–Neuenmarkt	42.5 km	15 October 1846
Neuenmarkt–Hof	52.9 km	1 November 1848
Hof (Saxon frontier)	13.0 km	20 November 1848
Centre		
Oberhausen–Nordheim	36.3 km	20 November 1844
Augsburg–Oberhausen	2.5 km	1 July 1847
Nordheim–Donauwörth	2.0 km	15 September 1847
Schwabach–Nürnberg	15.0 km	1 April 1849
Donauwörth–Oettingen	42.4 km	15 May 1849
Oettingen–Gunzenhausen	26.5 km	20 August 1849
Gunzenhausen–Schwabach	45.5 km	1 October 1849
Southern		
Augsburg–Kaufbeuren	60.2 km	1 September 1847
Kaufbeuren–Kempten	42.5 km	1 April 1852
Kempten–Immenstadt	21.7 km	1 May 1853
Immenstadt–Oberstaufen	16.9 km	1 September 1853
Oberstaufen–Aeschach	49.7 km	12 October 1853
Aeschach–Lindau Bf.	1.8 km	1 March 1854

== Sources ==
- Hehl, Markus (1993). Eisenbahn im Allgäu. 150 Jahre Ludwig-Süd-Nord-Bahn. Eisenbahn-Kurier Special (in German). Vol. 46. Freiburg im Breisgau: EK-Verlag.
- Kuchinke, Stephan (1997). Die Ludwigs-Süd-Nordbahn von Lindau nach Hof (in German). Stuttgart: Transpress. ISBN 3-613-71064-1.
- Lüdecke, Steffen (1993). Die Schiefe Ebene. Eine legendäre Eisenbahnstrecke (in German). Freiburg im Breisgau: EK-Verlag. ISBN 3-88255-833-4.
- Asmus, Carl. "Eisenbahnen im Allgäu". Eisenbahn-Journal (in German). Part 1: ISSN 0720-051X, part 2: ISBN 3-922404-44-8, part 3: ISBN 3-922404-31-6.
- Klee, Wolfgang; v. Welser, Ludwig (1995) [1993]. Bayern-Report (in German). Vol. 1–5. Fürstenfeldbruck.
- Dt. Reichsbahn (1935). Die deutschen Eisenbahnen in ihrer Entwicklung 1835–1935 (in German). Berlin.
- Scheingraber, Günther (1975). Die Königlich Bayerischen Staatseisenbahnen (in German). Stuttgart.
- v. Welser, Ludwig (2001) [1994]. Bayern-Report (in German). Vol. 4–9. Fürstenfeldbruck.
- Zeitler, Walther; Hufschläger, Helge (1980). Eisenbahnen in Schwaben - 1840 bis heute (in German). Motorbuch-Verlag.
