= Ebrach (disambiguation) =

Ebrach is a community in the Upper Franconian district of Bamberg.

Ebrach may also refer to various rivers in Bavaria, Germany:

- Ebrach (Attel), a tributary of the Attel
- Rauhe Ebrach, a tributary of the Regnitz near Pettstadt
- Reiche Ebrach, a tributary of the Regnitz near Hirschaid
- Mittlere Ebrach, a tributary of the Rauhe Ebrach
- Ebrach (Reiche Ebrach), also called Geiselwinder Ebrach, tributary of the Reiche Ebrach
