= Steigerwald =

Hill region in Germany

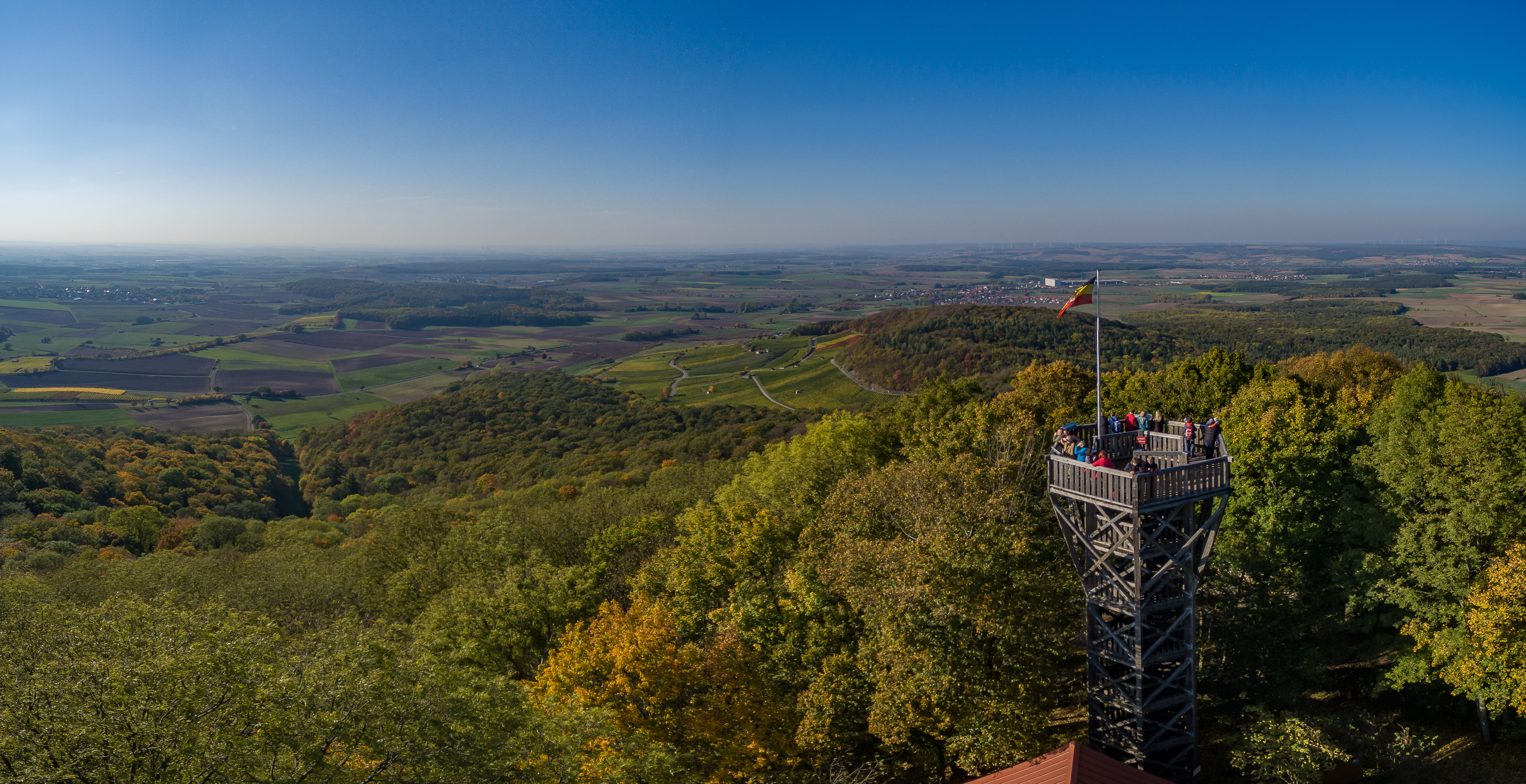
- View from the Zabelstein looking north over the Schweinfurt Basin

Highest point
- Peak: Scheinberg
- Elevation: 498.5 m above NHN

Dimensions
- Area: 1,115.2 km^{2} (430.6 mi^{2})

Geography
- Location within Bavaria
- State: Bavaria
- Range coordinates: 49°36′51″N 10°17′14″E
- Parent range: Franconian Keuper-Lias Land

The Steigerwald (German pronunciation: [ˈʃtaɪɡɐvalt]) is a hill region up to 498.5 m above sea level (NHN) in the Bavarian-Franconian part of the South German Scarplands between Würzburg and Nuremberg. It is part of the Keuper Uplands, and within it, it is continued to the north-northeast and right of the river Main, by the Haßberge, and to the south-southwest by the Franconian Heights. Part of the region is a designated as the Steigerwald Nature Park.

== Geography ==
=== Location ===
The Steigerwald lies at the junction of the Bavarian provinces of Lower, Middle, and Upper Franconia, the tripoint being marked by the Dreifrankenstein. It is located between the cities of Bamberg, Schweinfurt, Würzburg, and Nuremberg. In the north, it is bounded by the course of the river Main, and in the east by the river Regnitz. Its southern boundary is formed by the river Aisch, and in the west by the Main again and a line from Marktbreit via Uffenheim to Bad Windsheim.

The Steigerwald covers the territories of six counties: Bamberg, Erlangen-Höchstadt, Haßberge, Kitzingen, Neustadt an der Aisch-Bad Windsheim, and Schweinfurt.

=== Natural regions ===
The Steigerwald is divided into these natural regions:

- part of the South German Scarplands (Südwestdeutsches Stufenland)
- part of the 11 Franconian Keuper-Lias Land (Fränkisches Keuper-Lias-Land)
- 115 Steigerwald (1115.2 km^{2})
  - 115.0 Southern (Anterior) Steigerwald (Südlicher (Vorderer) Steigerwald)
  - 115.1 Middle Steigerwald (Mittlerer Steigerwald)
  - 115.0 Northern Steigerwald (Nördlicher Steigerwald)

=== Hills ===
Among the hills and high points of the Steigerwald are, sorted by height in metres above sea level (NHN) (unless otherwise stated these are based on):

- Scheinberg (498.5 m),
  near Reusch (Weigenheim)
- Hoher Landsberg (498 m);
  with Hohenlandsberg Castle ruins
- Zabelstein (489 m);
  with viewing tower (475.0 m)
- Großer Knetzberg (487.5 m),
  near Eschenau (Knetzgau)
- Stollberg (475,6 m),
  near Handthal (Oberschwarzach); with the nearby Stollburg Castle ruins
- Schwanberg (473,7 m);
  with Schloss Schwanberg (456 m)
- Friedrichsberg (473.1 m),
  near Abtswind; with transmission tower
- Herrschaftsberg (463 m);
  with Schloss Frankenberg
- Bergholz (442.8 m),
  near Ulsenheim (Markt Nordheim)
- Schlossberg, Markt Einersheim (420 m);
  with Speckfeld Castle ruins
- Schlossberg Roman camp (396.6 m);
  with site of Oberschloss
- Wildberg (393.1 m),
  near Wildberghof (Markt Nordheim); with site of Wildberg Castle

=== Rivers ===
Due to the steep slopes on its western side, most of the larger rivers rising in the Steigerwald flow in an easterly or southeasterly direction. They do not usually flow directly into the River Main in the northeast, but empty either into the Regnitz in the east or its tributary, the Aisch, which flanks the Steigerwald in the southeast and forms a natural dividing line with the heights of the Franconian Heights.

These rivers and streams rise in the Steigerwald and flow in an easterly direction (arranged north to south):

- Aurach (into the Regnitz)
- Rauhe Ebrach (into the Regnitz)
- Mittelebrach (into the Rauhen Ebrach)
- Reiche Ebrach (into the Regnitz)
- Kleine Weisach (into the Aisch)
- Weisach (into the Aisch)
- Steinach (into the Aisch)
- Laimbach (into the Ehebach)
  - Scheine (left-hand headstream)
  - Bibart (right-hand headstream)
- Ehebach (into the Aisch)

== Transport ==
The main transport arteries passing by the Steigerwald are the A 70 in the north, the A 7 in the west, and the A 73 in the east. Crossing the hills and nature park is the A 3, the main road link between Frankfurt, Wurzburg, and Nuremberg, and the federal roads of the B 22, B 286, and B 8.

A tourist route, the Steigerwald High Road (Steigerwald-Höhenstraße), crosses the Steigerwald in a north–south direction.

== Viticulture ==
Wine connoisseurs know the Steigerwald from its Franconian wines, which are grown in the west of the region. Well-known names include Abtswinder Altenberg, Casteller Bausch, Handthaler Stollberg, Ippesheimer Herrschaftsberg, Bullenheimer Paradies, Wiesenbronner Wachhügel, and Ziegelangerer Ölschnabel.

== Nature conservation ==
=== Nature park and nature reserves ===
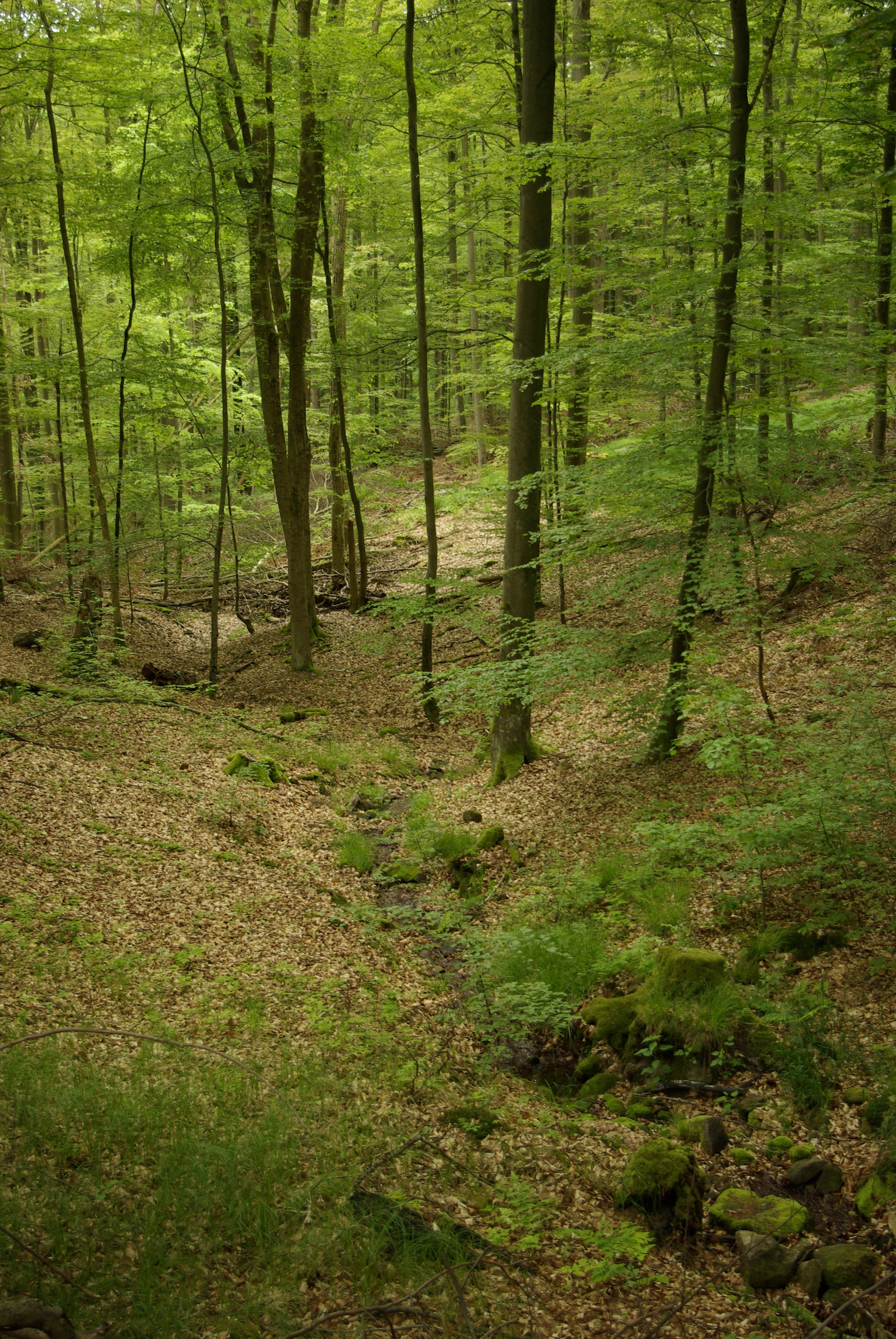
The Naturwaldreservat Brunnstube Nature Reserve within the Nature Park, in the unincorporated area of Ebracher Forst

Large parts of the Steigerwald have been designated since 1988 as the Steigerwald Nature Park. Around half the nature park area is covered by protected landscapes. On a smaller scale, several nature reserves are designated.

In addition are the protected habitats of 6029-371 Buchenwälder und Wiesentäler des Nordsteigerwalds und 6327-371 Vorderer Steigerwald mit Schwanberg as well as the European Special Protection Areas 6029-471 Oberer Steigerwald und 6327-471 Südlicher Steigerwald.

=== National park and world heritage discussions ===
Within the various counties whose territories include the Steigerwald, discussions have taken place about taking parts of the forest out of use and classifying them as protected areas. Since 2008, controversy has existed over whether certain areas should become a national park or not. Proponents see this contributing to conservation and increasing tourism. Opponents fear that the designated areas would no longer be used for forestry. Since 15 January 2015, the Steigerwald clearly can no longer be a UNESCO World Heritage Site because the UNESCO nomination process has finished. At a meeting in the Bavarian Parliament with Prime Minister Horst Seehofer, the Bavarian Environment Minister Ulrike Scharf, Forestry Minister Helmut Brunner, and the three county councillors of the Schweinfurt (Florian Töpper), Haßberge (Wilhelm Schneider), and Bamberg (Johann Kalb), this was not yet known. The result then was that a working group of representatives of the two ministries and the three county councils would establish the foundations for an application for World Heritage status by the end of January 2015.

According to Töpper, a prerequisite was unity between the parties that no national park should be in the Steigerwald. Seehofer was to ensure that, by the end of January 2014, a measure adopted by the Bamberg council for a controversial, 775-hectare forest reserve in the Ebrach Forest was withdrawn.

Authority for the disputed protected area was withdrawn in September 2015 because it was determined to be illegal. This 'illegality' was confirmed by the government of Upper Franconia. As a result, on 1 September 2015, the regulation was lifted. According to the legal view of the Government of Upper Franconia, the "regulation by the Bamberg Council for the protected landscape of 'the high beech woods in the Ebrach Forest' dated 16 April 2014 was illegal because the regulation was not covered by the enabling provision of § 29 BNatSchG." The Upper Franconian government also recorded, " the High Beech Wood is not a suitable object of protection for a protected landscape area". It is, according to the government "not an object that stands out from the landscape, as the law requires it to be. Therefore, the regulation is to be rescinded for legal reasons and also in the interests of legal clarity and legal certainly."
