= Burgwindheim =

- Municipality
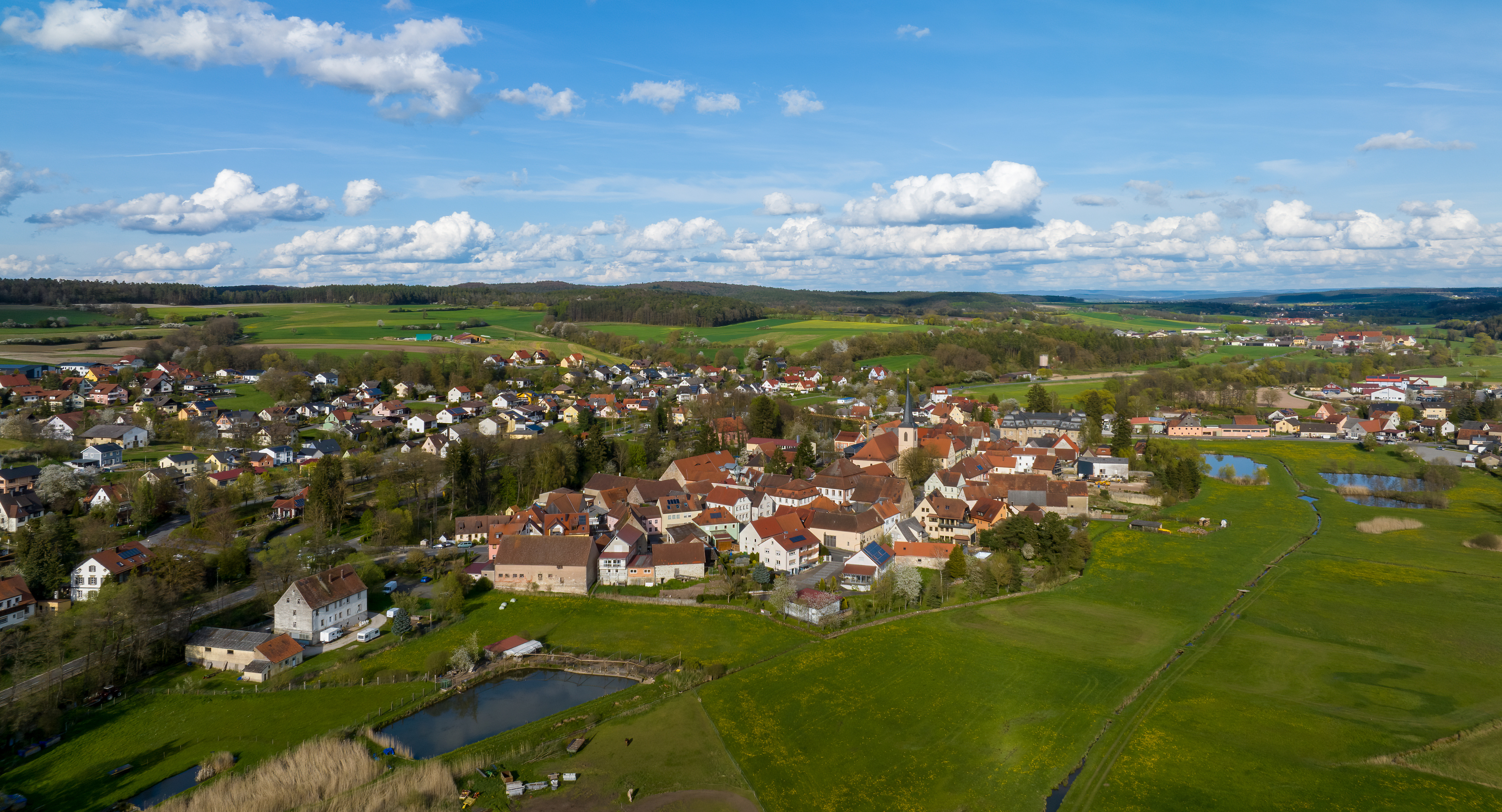
- Aerial view of Burgwindheim

- Coat of arms

- Location of Burgwindheim within Bamberg district
- Interactive map of Burgwindheim
- Location within Germany Location within Bavaria
- Coordinates: 49°50′N 10°36′E
- Country: Germany
- State: Bavaria
- Admin. region: Oberfranken
- District: Bamberg
- Municipal assoc.: Ebrach

Government
  - Mayor (2020–26): Johannes Polenz (CSU)

Area
  - Total: 37.38 km^{2} (14.43 sq mi)
- Elevation: 292 m (958 ft)

Population (2025-12-31)
  - Total: 1,286
  - Density: 34.40/km^{2} (89.10/sq mi)
- Time zone: UTC+01:00 (CET)
  - Summer (DST): UTC+02:00 (CEST)
- Postal codes: 96154
- Dialling codes: 09551
- Vehicle registration: BA
- Website: www.burgwindheim.de

Burgwindheim (German pronunciation: [bʊʁkˈvɪnthaɪm]; Mainfränkisch: Winnem) is a municipality with market rights in the west of the Upper Franconian district of Bamberg and a member of the administrative community (Verwaltungsgemeinschaft) of Ebrach.

== Geography ==
Burgwindheim lies west-southwest of Bamberg in the Steigerwald (forest). It is found between Ebrach in the west and Burgebrach in the east, on the Mittlere Ebrach.

== History ==
The name’s meaning is unclear. Could it have something to do with an early settler named “Wind”, or does the community’s Wendish past yield the name? The leaping greyhound (a Wendish symbol) in the coat of arms might offer a clue.

The community had its first documentary mention in 1140. It is believed to have been settled at the time of the Frankish taking of the land.

In 1278, the knight Ludewig von Windeheim bequeathed his estate to the Cistercian Monastery at Ebrach.

In 1363, Burgwindheim was granted market rights by Emperor Karl IV, making it the Steigerwald’s oldest market.

Since the Reichsdeputationshauptschluss of 1803, the community has belonged to Bavaria. Direct Imperial authority over the Monastery at Ebrach was only recognized once Secularization had taken place, meaning that its property, unlike the Würzburg High Monastery’s belongings, never passed temporarily to the Archduke Ferdinand of Tuscany, but remained with Bavaria.

In the course of administrative reform, the communities of Kötsch, Untersteinach and Unterweiler were amalgamated with Burgwindheim in 1972. The ten – or eleven – constituent communities are listed here with their population figures:

- Burgwindheim 799
- Kappel 65
- Kehlingsdorf 48
- Kötsch 101
- Mendenmühle 2 (counted demographically as part of Untersteinach)
- Mittelsteinach 88
- Obersteinach 7
- Oberweiler 68
- Schrappach 55
- Untersteinach 127 (with Mendenmühle)
- Unterweiler 60

The community also has four traditional rural land units, known in German as Gemarkungen, named Kötsch, Untersteinach, Unterweiler and Burgwindheim, the same names as four of the constituent communities (it is traditional for a Gemarkung to be named after a town or village lying nearby).

=== Population development ===
Within municipal limits, 1,375 inhabitants were counted in 1970, 1,350 in 1987 and 1,445 in 2000. In 2007 it was 1,423.

== Politics ==
The mayor is Johannes Polenz, elected in March 2020.

The community council is made up of 12 members, listed here by party or voter community affiliation, and also with the number of seats that each holds, since the 2020 local elections:

- CSU 4
- Demokratische Liste Burgwindheim 3
- Christlich Unabhängige Wählergemeinschaft 3
- Bürgerblock 2

In 1999, municipal tax revenue, converted to euros, amounted to €616,000 of which business taxes (net) amounted to €157,000.

=== Coat of arms ===
Burgwindheim’s arms might heraldically be described thus: Argent a greyhound salient sable crowned Or with a collar of the same.

== Economy and infrastructure ==
According to official statistics, there were 616 workers on the social welfare contribution rolls working in producing businesses in 1998, and in trade and transport none. In other areas, 45 workers on the social welfare contribution rolls were employed, and 461 such workers worked from home. In processing businesses there was one business, and in construction two, and furthermore, in 1999, there were 64 agricultural operations with a working area of 1 404 ha, of which 914 ha was cropland and 489 ha was meadowland.

=== Education ===
In 1999, the following institutions existed in Burgwindheim:

- 50 kindergarten places with 53 children
- Primary school with 6 teachers and 144 pupils

== The Miracle of the Host ==
A wonder that happened at the Corpus Christi procession in 1465 made Burgwindheim into a pilgrimage place.

The Monstrance happened on an altar “without outside help and without the wind’s influence”. The Host bread fell to the ground. The priest could not free it from the ground, even with all his strength. A wooden shed was built to keep watch on the bread. The convent at Ebrach prepared itself in an eight-day prayer to lift the bread up again. It was managed, and the Abbot of Ebrach brought the Host back into the parish church again. The event was regarded as a miracle, and only two years later arose a chapel to the “Holy Blood”. The number of pilgrims rose when in 1625 a spring sprang up, which was soon said to be miraculous.

== Burgwindheim in popular culture ==
Burgwindheim, along with one other community in the Bamberg district – Gundelsheim – is mentioned in a poem entitled simply A Poem, whose authorship is unclear. However, it is likely by either Terry Jones or Michael Palin, since it does appear in a book that they wrote together, Bert Fegg's Nasty Book for Boys and Girls. The poem itself uses only one rhyme, and both communities’ names happen to fit the rhyme.
