= Aurach (Regnitz, Oberfranken) =

River in Germany

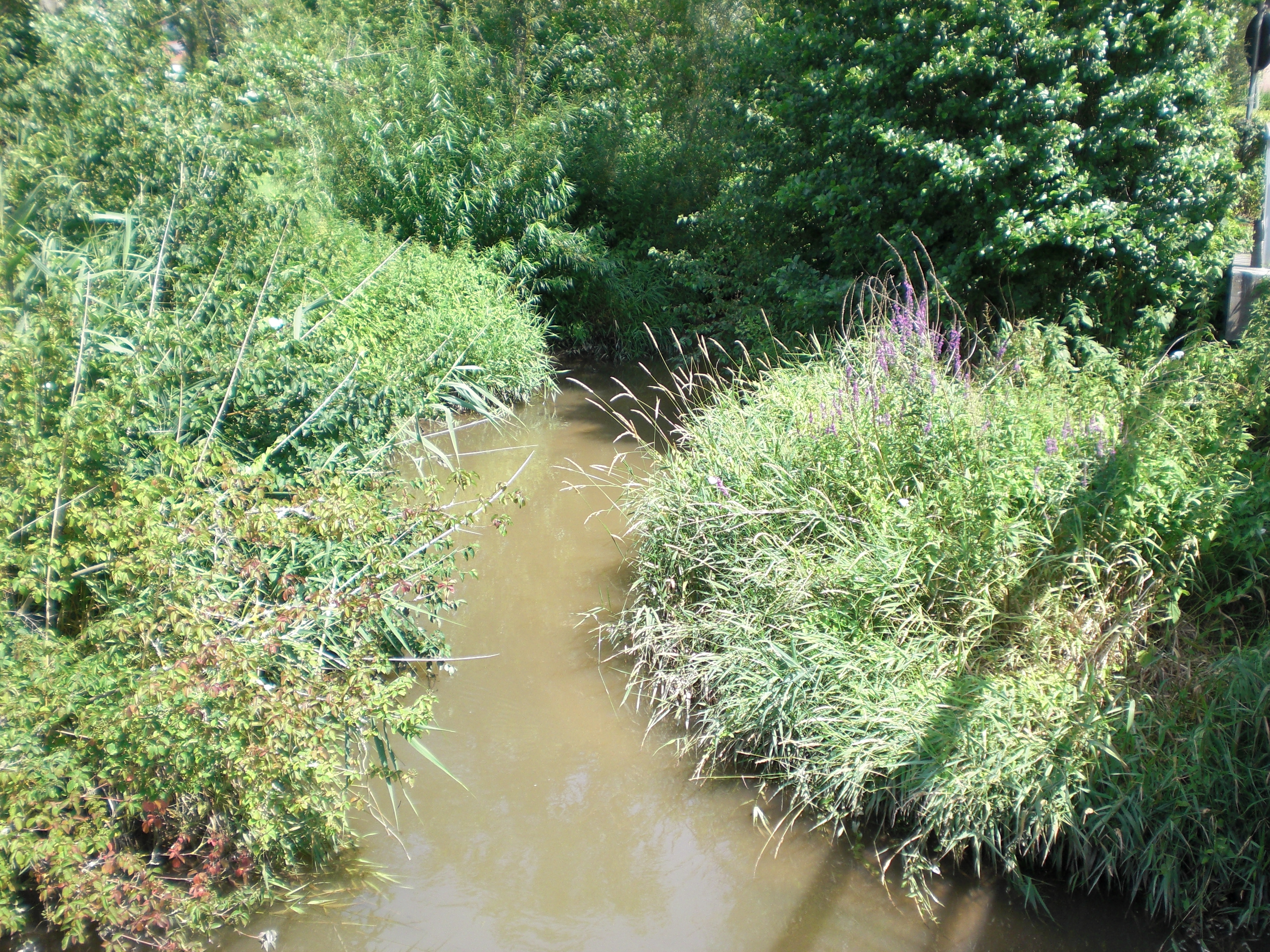
- The Aurach at Stegaurach

- Location of map in Bavaria

Location
- Country: Germany
- State: Bavaria

Physical characteristics
- Source
  - location: east of in Neuschleichach (Oberaurach)
  - elevation: 394 metres (1,293 ft)
- Mouth
  - location: north of Pettstadt into the Regnitz
  - coordinates: 49.8450°N 10.9350°E
  - elevation: 240 metres (790 ft)
- Length: 39.0 km (24.2 mi)
- Basin size: 108 km^{2} (42 sq mi)

Basin features
- Progression: Regnitz→ Main→ Rhine→ North Sea

There exists also another river named Aurach that is a tributary of the Regnitz, see Aurach (Regnitz, Mittelfranken). For other uses, see Aurach (disambiguation).

Aurach (German pronunciation: [ˈaʊʁax]) is a river in Bavaria, Germany. It is a left tributary of the Regnitz in Upper Franconia.

The Aurach has its source in the Steigerwald Nature Park west of the village of Oberaurach, between the mountains Euerberg and Beerberg. The Aurach first flows in eastern and then in south-eastern direction, through, among others, Priesendorf and Walsdorf. Its mouth into the Regnitz is downstream from Stegaurach, just north of Pettstadt and somewhat south of Bamberg.

The river runs in the north parallel to the Rauhe Ebrach, which flows into the Regnitz just one kilometer southwards of the Aurach, and in the south parallel to the Main, which flows in the opposite direction.

== See also ==
- List of rivers of Bavaria
