= Kleinbirkach =

Coordinates: 49°47′30″N 10°28′55″E

Kleinbirkach is a village located in Upper Franconia, Bavaria, Germany, and is a part of the town of Ebrach. It is most well known for its proximity to the Dreifrankenstein. Its current population is 29.
