= Gundelsheim =

Gundelsheim may refer to places in Germany:

- Gundelsheim, Baden-Württemberg
- Gundelsheim, Bavaria
