= Dreifrankenstein =

Boundary stone in Germany

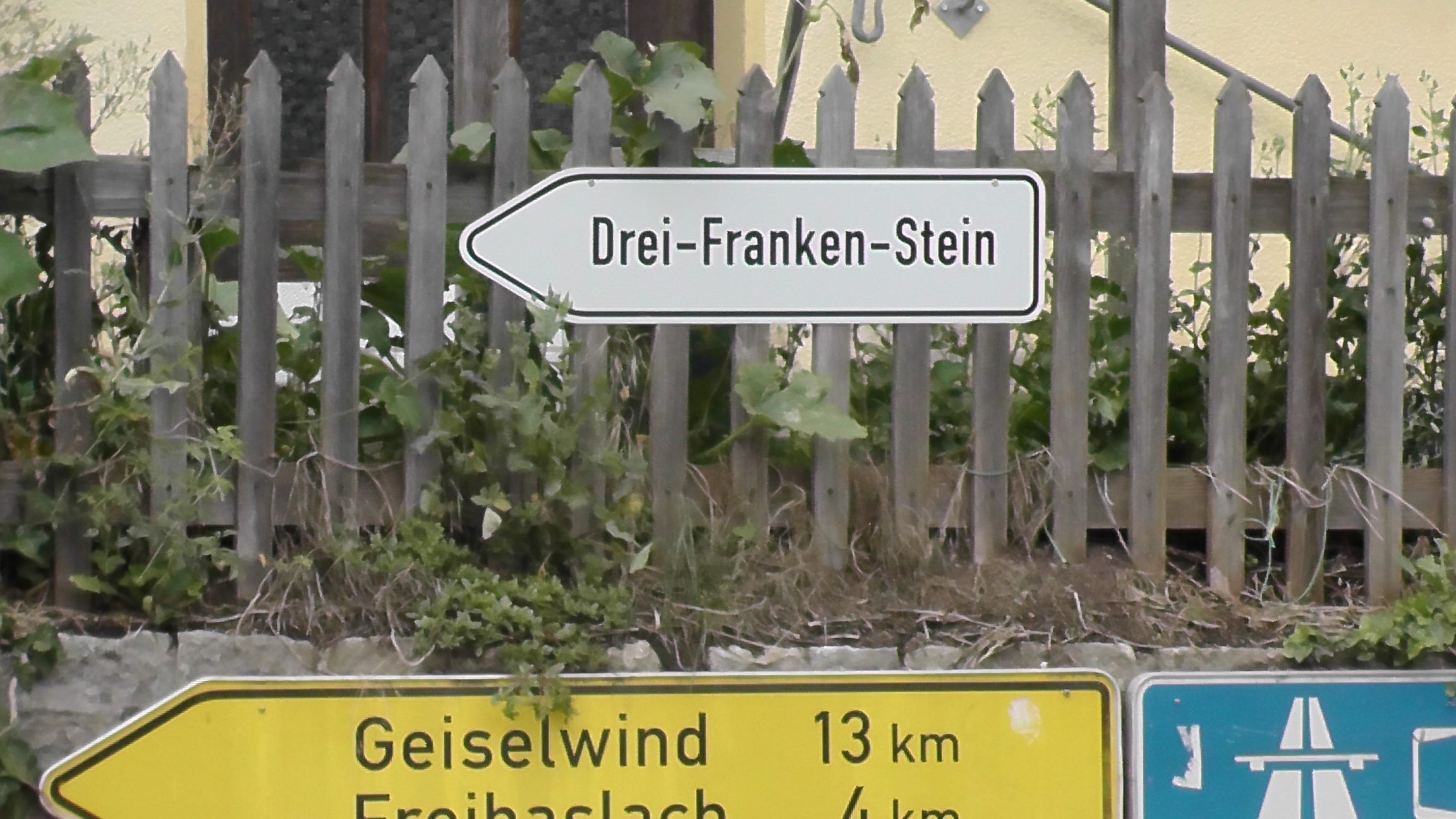
Sign to Dreifrankenstein in Burghaslach

The Dreifrankenstein (German for Three Franconias Stone) is a boundary stone that marks the tripoint where the three Franconian provinces of Upper, Middle and Lower Franconia meet in southern Germany. As part of the regional reforms in 1972 the boundary marker was moved around 7 kilometres as the crow flies to the southeast. Today both points are marked by stones that are referred to as the Old and New Dreifrankenstein.

== Old Dreifrankenstein ==
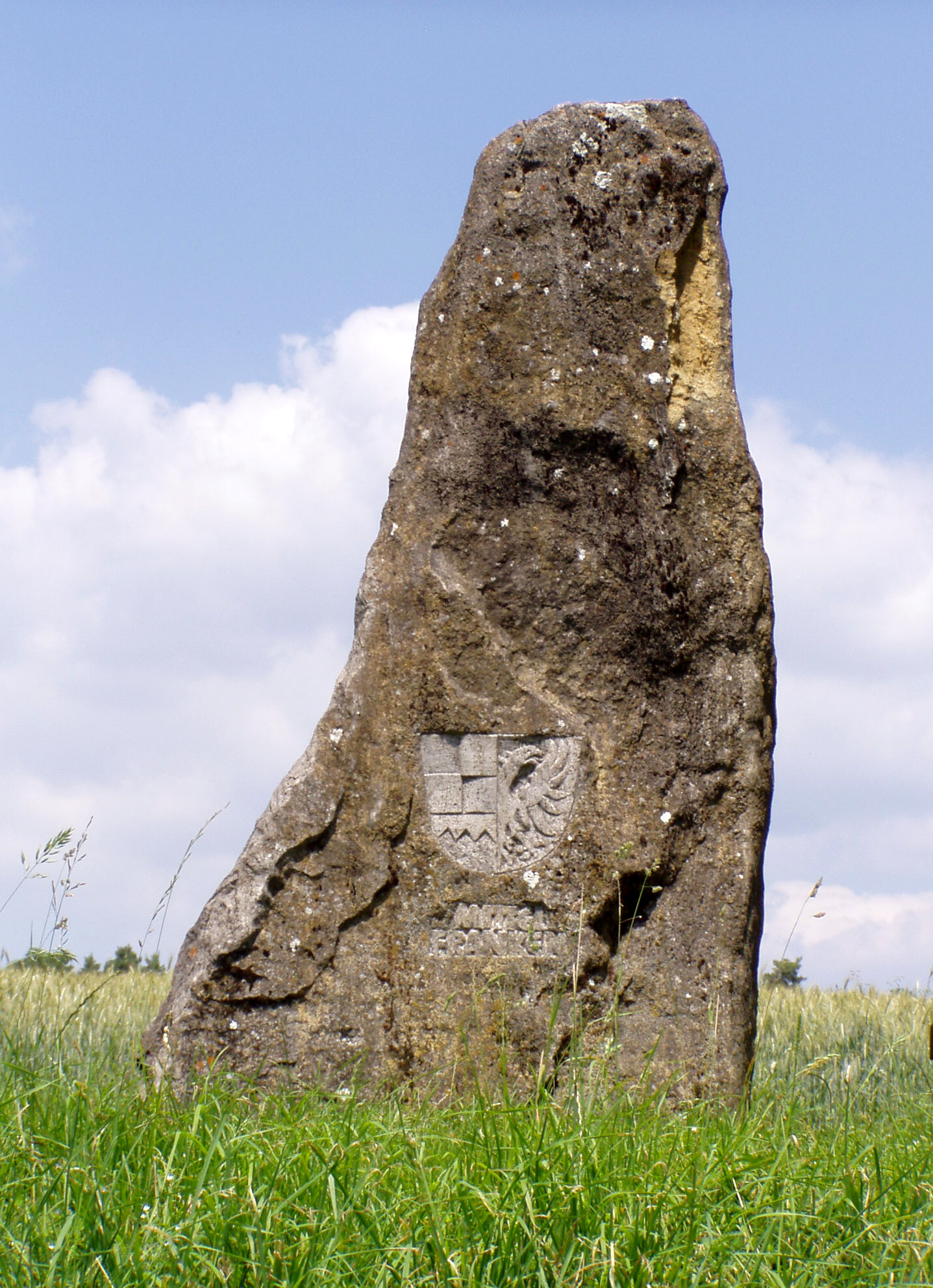
The New Dreifrankenstein in the Steigerwald, parish of Schlüsselfeld, coat of arms of Middle Franconia

The Old Dreifrankenstein (Alter Dreifrankenstein) erected in 1892, is a 135 cm high column made of sandstone. It is located in woodland on the territory of Sandhügel, several hundred metres west of Kleinbirkach (in the borough of the market town of Ebrach) and east of Ebersbrunn (Markt Geiselwind, Lower Franconia) near the source region of the Reiche Ebrach stream. Its GPS coordinates are 49°47′32″N 10°28′01″E.

== New Dreifrankenstein ==
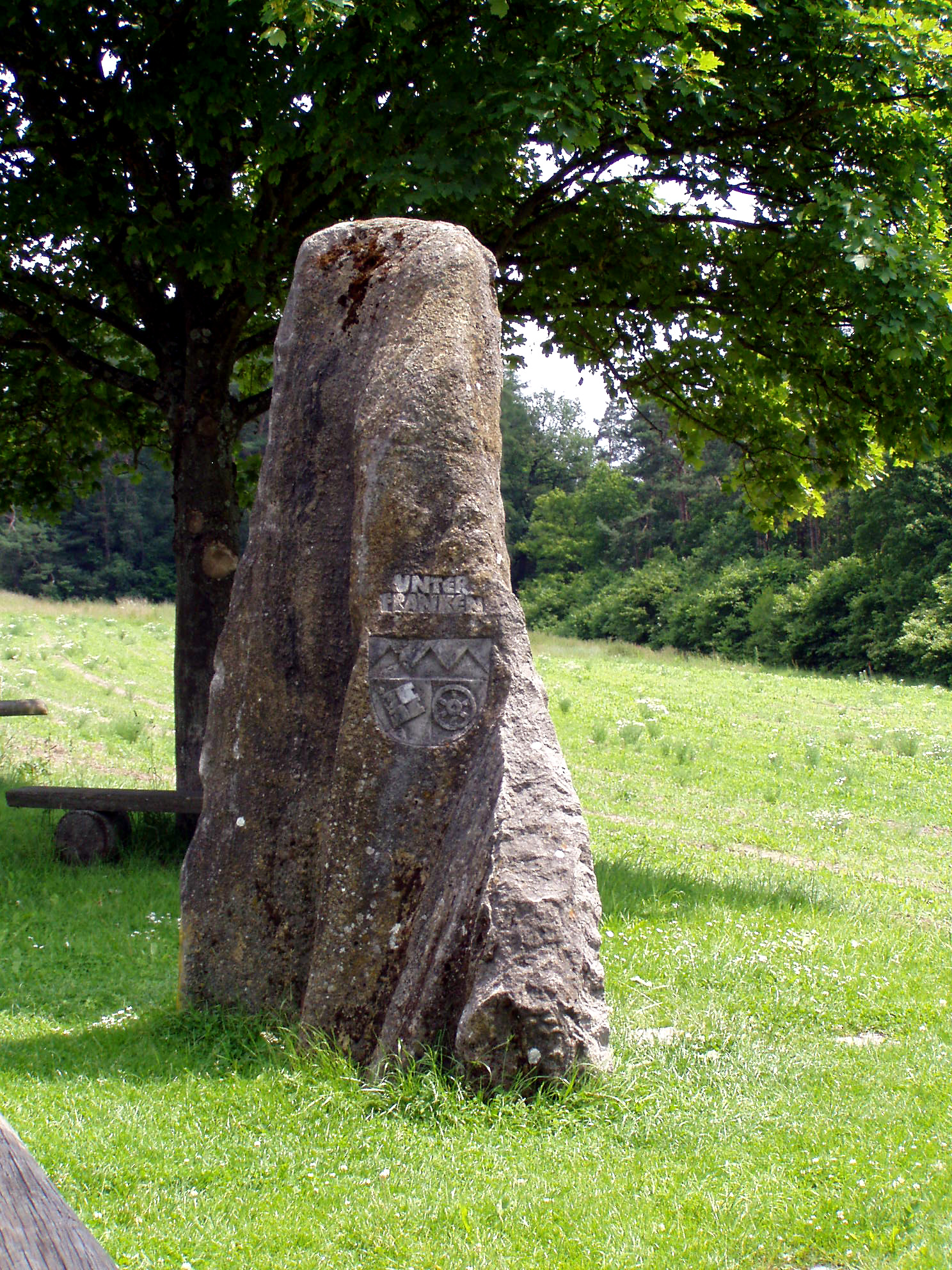
The New Dreifrankenstein - showing the coat of arms of Lower Franconia

The New Dreifrankenstein (Neuer Dreifrankenstein), laid in 1979, is a 280 cm high glacial erratic made of muschelkalk, in which the coats of arms of the three Franconian provinces have been carved. It is located on an eminence in the Steigerwald forest, southwest of Heuchelheim (in the borough of Schlüsselfeld, Upper Franconia), northwest of Freihaslach (Markt Burghaslach, Middle Franconia) and east of Sixtenberg (Markt Geiselwind, Lower Franconia). Its GPS coordinates are 49°45′21″N 10°33′04″E.

On the Dreifrankenstein is a geodetic reference point whose coordinates are 49.75565987°N 10.55110917°E.
