= Wettringen, Bavaria =

Wettringen
- Municipality
- Coat of arms

- Location of Wettringen within Ansbach district
- Interactive map of Wettringen
- Location within Germany Location within Bavaria
- Coordinates: 49°15′N 10°9′E
- Country: Germany
- State: Bavaria
- Admin. region: Mittelfranken
- District: Ansbach
- Municipal assoc.: Schillingsfürst
- Subdivisions: 7 Ortsteile

Government
  - Mayor (2020–26): Matthias Rößler

Area
  - Total: 21.41 km^{2} (8.27 sq mi)
- Elevation: 423 m (1,388 ft)

Population (2025-12-31)
  - Total: 957
  - Density: 44.7/km^{2} (116/sq mi)
- Time zone: UTC+01:00 (CET)
  - Summer (DST): UTC+02:00 (CEST)
- Postal codes: 91631
- Dialling codes: 09869
- Vehicle registration: AN
- Website: www.wettringen-mfr.de

Wettringen (German pronunciation: [ˈvɛtʁɪŋən]) is a municipality in the district of Ansbach in Bavaria in Germany and is part of the Nuremberg metropolitan region. The municipality is a member of the administrative community of Schillingsfürst.

The municipality is located approx. 30 kilometers west of Ansbach in the Frankenhöhe Nature Park.
