= Aurach (Regnitz, Mittelfranken) =

River in Germany

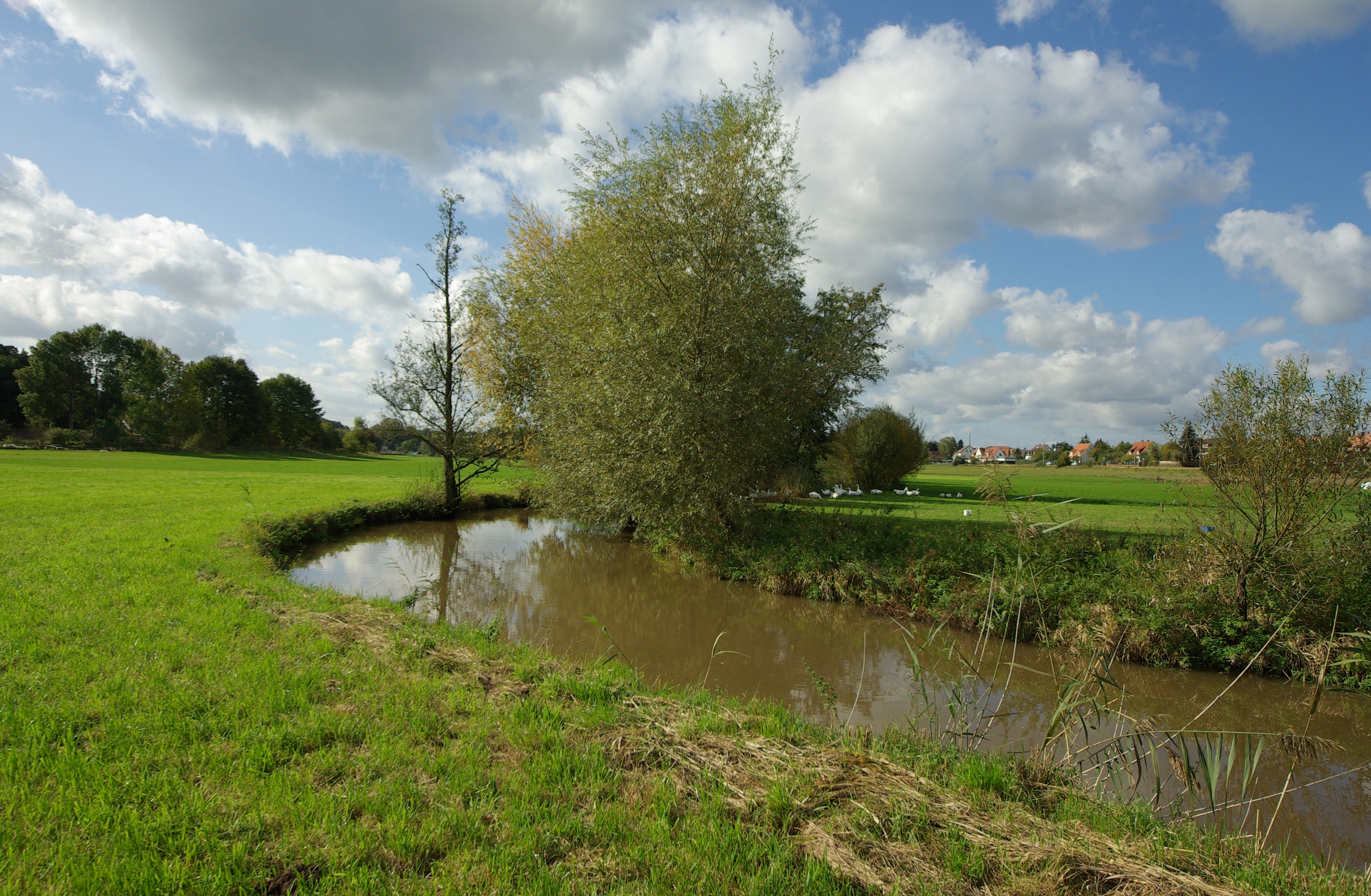
- The Aurach at Neuses, a district of Erlangen, in the background Niederndorf, a district of Herzogenaurach

- Location of mouth in Bavaria

Location
- Country: Germany
- State: Bavaria

Physical characteristics
- Mouth
  - location: Regnitz
  - coordinates: 49.5712°N 10.9834°E
- Length: 39.3 km (24.4 mi)
- Basin size: 165 km^{2} (64 sq mi)

Basin features
- Progression: Regnitz→ Main→ Rhine→ North Sea

There exists also another river named Aurach that is a tributary of the Regnitz, see Aurach (Regnitz, Oberfranken). For other uses, see Aurach (disambiguation).

Aurach (German pronunciation: [ˈaʊʁax]; also: Mittlere Aurach) is a river in Bavaria, Germany. It is a tributary of the river Regnitz.

The river Aurach begins in the Franconian Heights to the west of the village of Klausaurach in the municipality of Markt Erlbach. It runs through Aurachtal, the town of Herzogenaurach, and Frauenaurach, a district of Erlangen. After crossing under the Main-Danube Canal, it joins the river Regnitz at Bruck, a district of Erlangen.

A recreational cycle path runs alongside the river from Herzogenaurach to Erlangen.

== See also ==
- List of rivers of Bavaria
