= Buch am Wald =

- Municipality
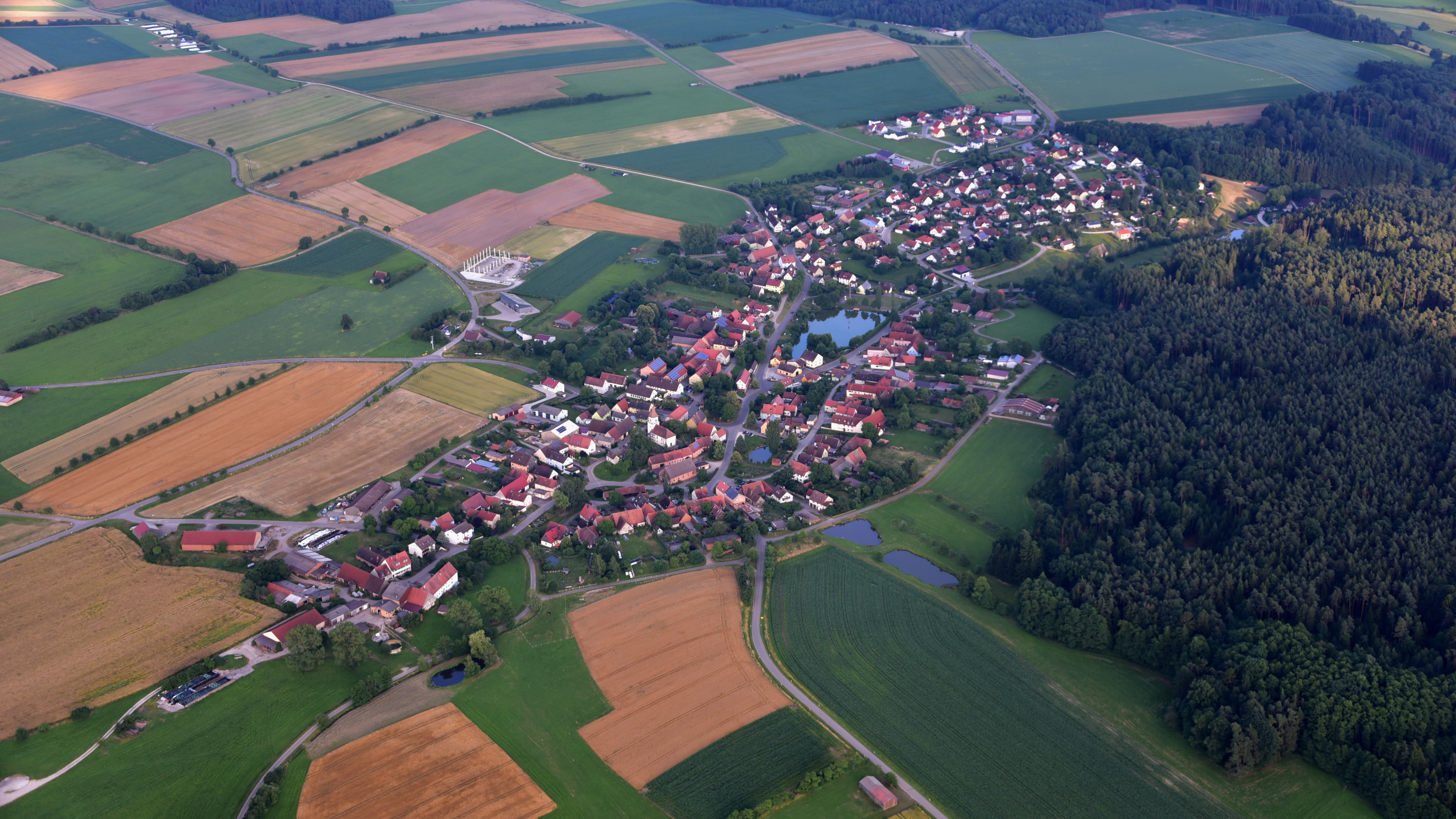
- Aerial view

- Coat of arms

- Location of Buch am Wald within Ansbach district
- Interactive map of Buch am Wald
- Location within Germany Location within Bavaria
- Coordinates: 49°19′N 10°19′E
- Country: Germany
- State: Bavaria
- Admin. region: Mittelfranken
- District: Ansbach
- Municipal assoc.: Schillingsfürst
- Subdivisions: 12 Ortsteile

Government
  - Mayor (2020–26): Friedrich Priester

Area
  - Total: 26.43 km^{2} (10.20 sq mi)
- Elevation: 465 m (1,526 ft)

Population (2025-12-31)
  - Total: 984
  - Density: 37.2/km^{2} (96.4/sq mi)
- Time zone: UTC+01:00 (CET)
  - Summer (DST): UTC+02:00 (CEST)
- Postal codes: 91592
- Dialling codes: 09867 (Ortskern) 09868 (Ortsteile)
- Vehicle registration: AN
- Website: www.buchamwald.de

Buch am Wald (German pronunciation: [ˈbuːx ʔam ˈvalt]) is a municipality in the district of Ansbach in Bavaria in Germany.
