= Gundelsheim, Bavaria =

Gundelsheim
- Municipality
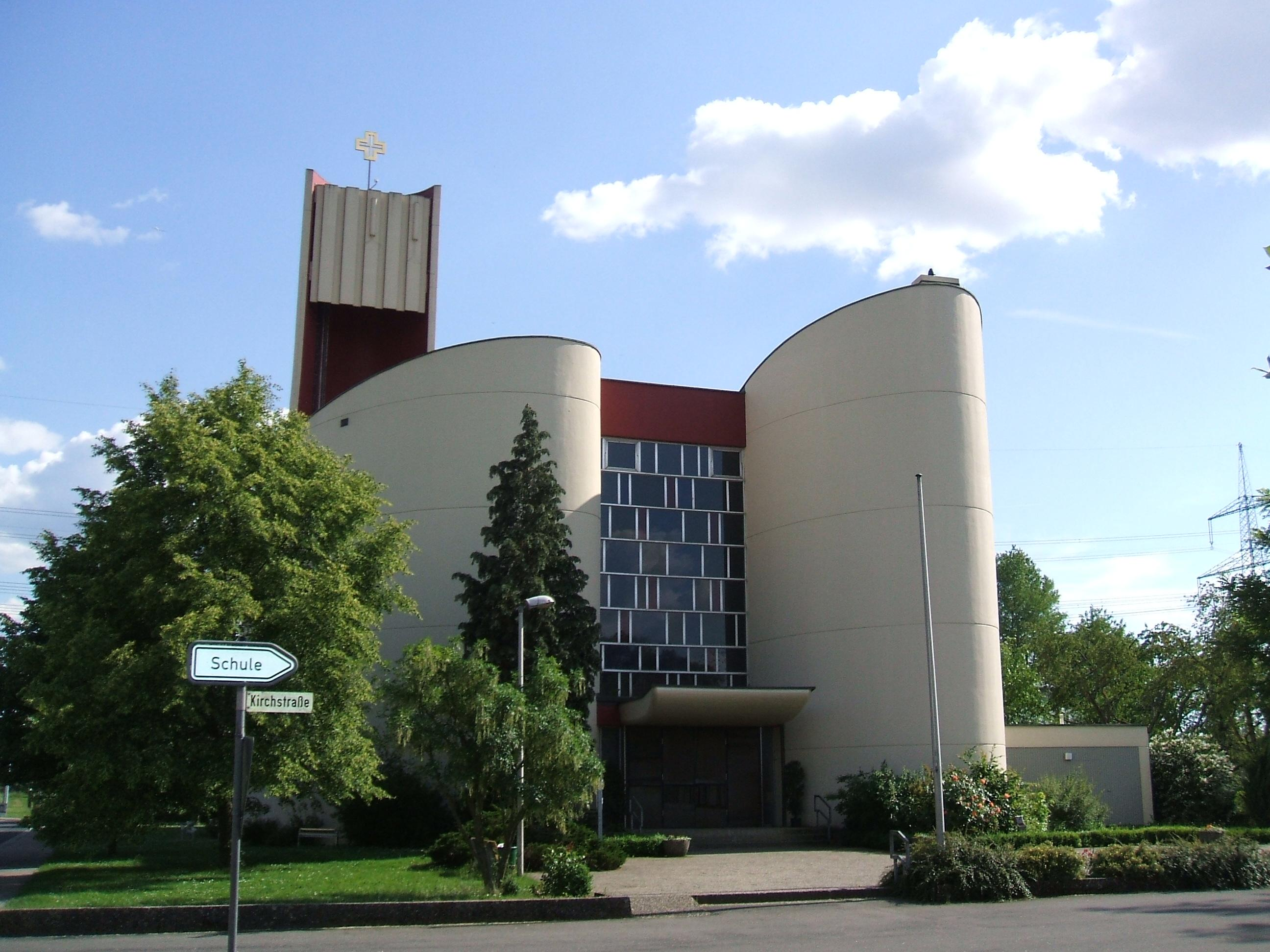
- Church of the Seven Sorrows of the Virgin Mary

- Coat of arms

- Location of Gundelsheim within Bamberg district
- Interactive map of Gundelsheim
- Location within Germany Location within Bavaria
- Coordinates: 49°55′N 10°55′E
- Country: Germany
- State: Bavaria
- Admin. region: Oberfranken
- District: Bamberg

Government
  - Mayor (2020–26): Jonas Merzbacher (SPD)

Area
  - Total: 3.77 km^{2} (1.46 sq mi)
- Elevation: 249 m (817 ft)

Population (2025-12-31)
  - Total: 3,535
  - Density: 938/km^{2} (2,430/sq mi)
- Time zone: UTC+01:00 (CET)
  - Summer (DST): UTC+02:00 (CEST)
- Postal codes: 96163
- Dialling codes: 0951
- Vehicle registration: BA
- Website: www.gemeinde-gundelsheim.de

Gundelsheim (German pronunciation: [ˈɡʊndl̩sˌhaɪm]) is a municipality in the Upper Franconian district of Bamberg.

== Geography ==
Gundelsheim lies in the Upper Franconia-West region and is found roughly seven kilometres north of Bamberg at the Kreuz Bamberg, a cloverleaf interchange between the Autobahnen A 70 and A 73.

The community has one of the traditional rural land units, known in German as Gemarkungen, also named Gundelsheim (it is traditional for a Gemarkung to be named after a town or village lying nearby).

== History ==
Gundelsheim belonged to the High Monastery at Bamberg, until the Reichsdeputationshauptschluss in 1803, since which time the community has belonged to Bavaria. In the course of administrative reform in Bavaria, today's community came into being under the Gemeindeedikt (“Community Edict”) of 1818. In 1962, the Sieben Schmerzen Mariä Church was built.

=== Population development ===
Within municipal limits, 1,335 inhabitants were counted in 1970, 2,755 in 1987, 3,339 in 2000 and 3,293 in June 2007.

== Politics ==
Since May 2008 mayor of Gundelsheim is Jonas Merzbacher (SPD)

In 1999, municipal tax revenue, converted to euros, amounted to €1,565,000 of which business taxes (net) amounted to €232,000.

The community council is made up of 16 members, listed here by party or voter community affiliation, and also with the number of seats that each holds, since the 2020 local elections:

- SPD: 5
- CSU: 4
- Greens: 2
- Bürgergemeinschaft Gundelsheim: 2
- Freie Wählergemeinschaft Gundelsheim: 2
- FDP: 1

== Economy and infrastructure ==
According to official statistics, there were 101 workers on the social welfare contribution rolls working in producing businesses in 1998, and in trade and transport 29. In other areas, 68 workers on the social welfare contribution rolls were employed, and 1,149 such workers worked from home. In processing businesses there was one business, and in construction 5. Furthermore, in 1999, there were 3 agricultural operations with a working area of 23 ha, of which 21 ha was cropland and 3 ha was meadowland.

=== Transport ===
Gundelsheim had a stop on the Bamberg–Scheßlitz railway, although this was closed to passenger traffic in 1985 and to goods traffic in 1988, and it was eventually dismantled.

The community has a city bus connection (Stadtwerke Bamberg).

=== Education ===
In Gundelsheim are found a kindergarten with 125 places and the primary school with 9 teachers and 136 pupils

The Kindergarten St. Marien offers children care in four groups, a nursery group for children between eight weeks and three years and for those from two to six, three other groups.

== Gundelsheim in popular culture ==
Gundelsheim, along with one other community in the Bamberg district – Burgwindheim – is mentioned in a poem entitled simply A Poem, whose authorship is unclear. However, it is likely by either Terry Jones or Michael Palin, since it does appear in a book that they wrote together, Bert Fegg's Nasty Book for Boys and Girls. The poem itself uses only one rhyme, and both communities’ names happen to fit the rhyme.
