= Schillingsfürst (Verwaltungsgemeinschaft) =

- Verwaltungsgemeinschaft
- Location of Schillingsfürst within Ansbach district
- Interactive map of Schillingsfürst
- Location within Germany Location within Bavaria
- Coordinates: 49°17′N 10°16′E
- Country: Germany
- State: Bavaria
- Admin. region: Middle Franconia
- District: Ansbach
- Seat: Schillingsfürst
- Subdivisions: 6 municipalities

Area
  - Total: 140.03 km^{2} (54.07 sq mi)

Population (2025-12-31)
  - Total: 9,827
  - Density: 70.18/km^{2} (181.8/sq mi)
- Time zone: UTC+01:00 (CET)
  - Summer (DST): UTC+02:00 (CEST)
- Website: www.vgsch.de//

Schillingsfürst is a Verwaltungsgemeinschaft (municipal association) in the district of Ansbach in Bavaria, Germany. Its seat is in Schillingsfürst.

It consists of the following municipalities:

1. Buch am Wald
2. Diebach
3. Dombühl
4. Schillingsfürst
5. Wettringen
6. Wörnitz
