= Oberaurach =

- Municipality
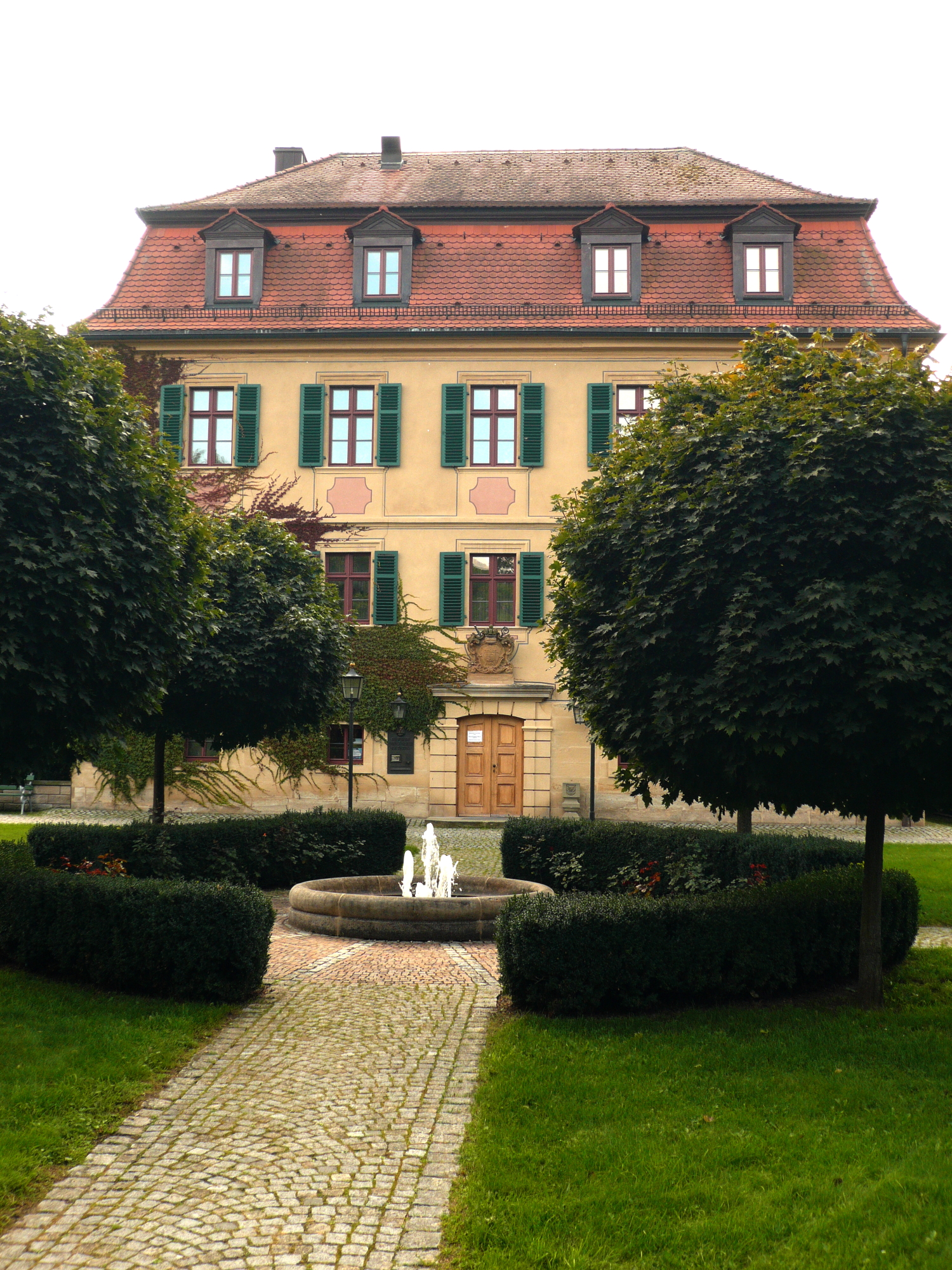
- Tretzendorf Castle, today the town hall of Oberaurach

- Coat of arms

- Location of Oberaurach within Haßberge district
- Interactive map of Oberaurach
- Location within Germany Location within Bavaria
- Coordinates: 49°55′N 10°37′E
- Country: Germany
- State: Bavaria
- Admin. region: Unterfranken
- District: Haßberge
- Subdivisions: 11 Ortsteile

Government
  - Mayor (2020–26): Thomas Sechser (CSU)

Area
  - Total: 45.14 km^{2} (17.43 sq mi)
- Elevation: 350 m (1,150 ft)

Population (2025-12-31)
  - Total: 3,995
  - Density: 88.50/km^{2} (229.2/sq mi)
- Time zone: UTC+01:00 (CET)
  - Summer (DST): UTC+02:00 (CEST)
- Postal codes: 97514
- Dialling codes: 09529
- Vehicle registration: HAS
- Website: www.oberaurach.de

Oberaurach is a municipality in the district of Haßberge in Bavaria in Germany.

There are 11 quarters belonging to Oberaurach:

- Dankenfeld
- Fatschenbrunn
- Hummelmarter
- Kirchaich
- Kotzmühle
- Neuschleichach
- Nützelsbach
- Oberschleichach
- Tretzendorf
- Trossenfurt
- Unterschleichach

== History ==
Some quarters have been mentioned as early as 741 and 753.

The municipality in its present form has been created in 1978, combining the then separate municipalities of Dankenfeld, Fatschenbrunn, Kirchaich, Neuschleichach, Oberschleichach, Tretzendorf, Trossenfurt and Unterschleichach. The name Oberaurach is an artificial word, describing the location of the municipality at the upper ("Ober") part of the river Aurach.
