= Ebrach (Verwaltungsgemeinschaft) =

- Verwaltungsgemeinschaft
- Location of Ebrach within Bamberg district
- Interactive map of Ebrach
- Location within Germany Location within Bavaria
- Coordinates: 49°50′N 10°30′E
- Country: Germany
- State: Bavaria
- Admin. region: Upper Franconia
- District: Bamberg
- Seat: Ebrach
- Subdivisions: 2 municipalities

Area
  - Total: 69.64 km^{2} (26.89 sq mi)

Population (2025-12-31)
  - Total: 3,113
  - Density: 44.70/km^{2} (115.8/sq mi)
- Time zone: UTC+01:00 (CET)
  - Summer (DST): UTC+02:00 (CEST)
- Website: www.vg-ebrach.de

Ebrach is a Verwaltungsgemeinschaft (municipal association) in the district of Bamberg in Bavaria, Germany. Its seat is in Ebrach. It consists of the following municipalities:

1. Burgwindheim
2. Ebrach
