= Steigerwald Nature Park =

Coordinates: 49°36′51″N 10°17′14″E

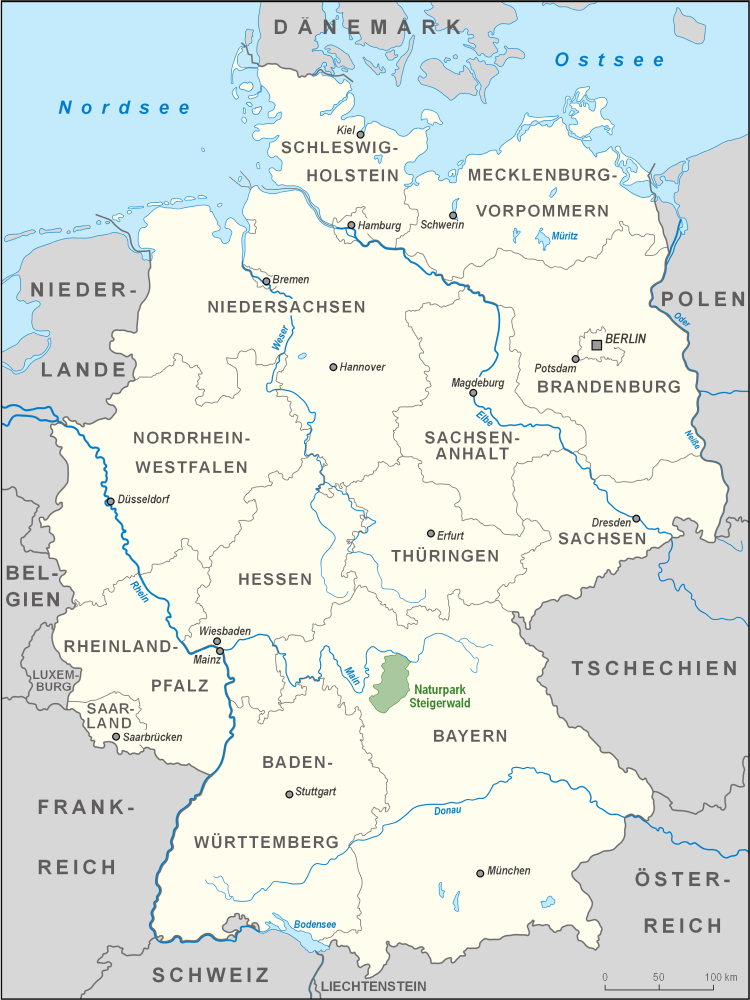
Location of the Steigerwald Nature Park

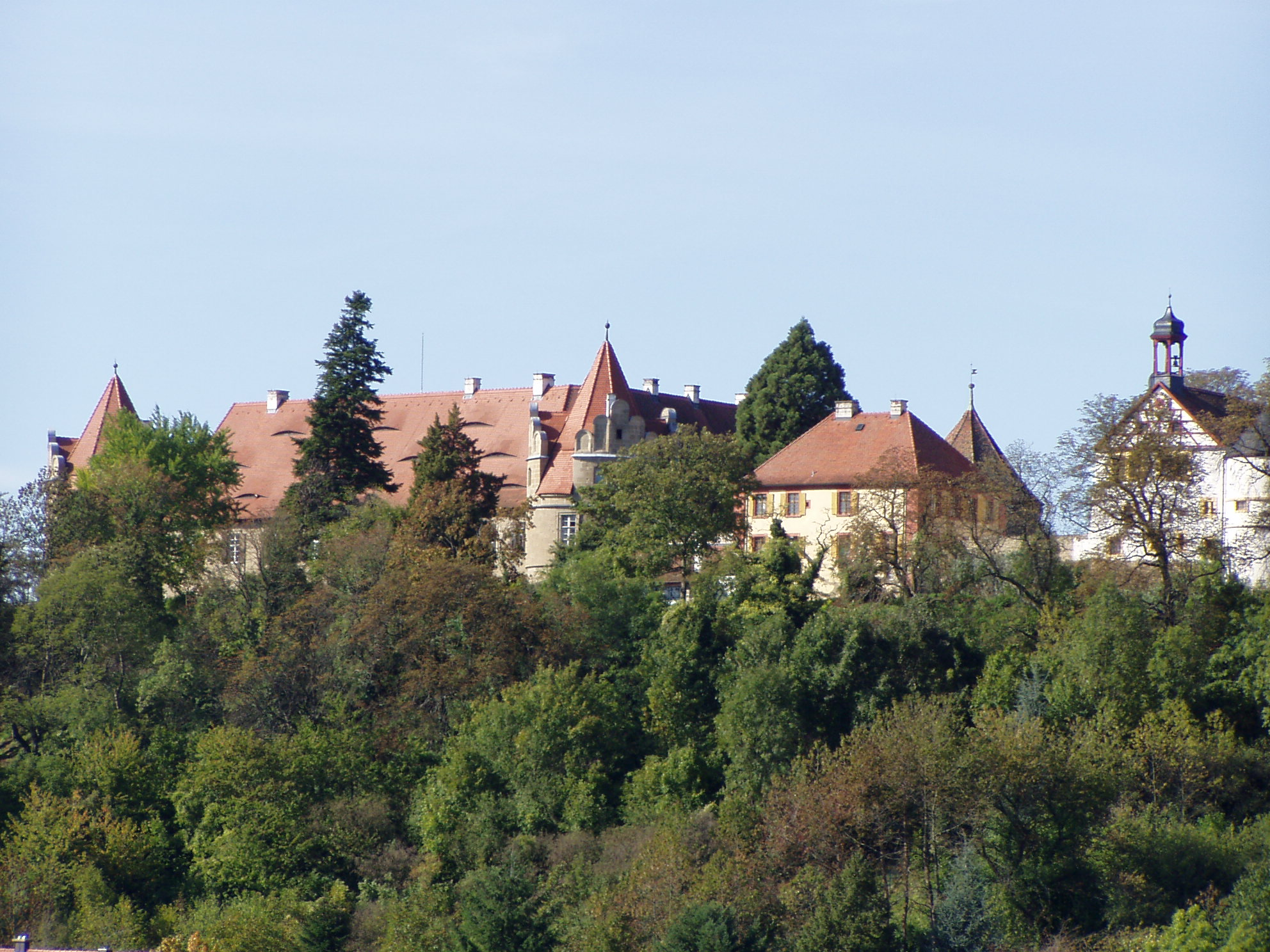
Frankenberg Castle in the Steigerwald

On 8 March 1988 the Bavarian State Ministry for State Development and the Environment designated an area of 1,280 square kilometres (490 sq mi) in the Steigerwald in North Bavaria, Germany, as the Steigerwald Nature Park (German: Naturpark Steigerwald). About half the area consists of protected landscapes. The nature park is run by the Steigerwald Tourist Association and Steigerwald Nature Park (Tourismusverband Steigerwald und Naturpark Steigerwald e.V.).

The landscape is characterised by deciduous and pine forests, ponds and vineyards.

== Location ==
The Steigerwald hill range straddles the Bavarian provinces of Lower, Middle and Upper Franconia and surrounds their tripoint which is marked by the Dreifrankenstein ("Three Franconias Stone"). It is located between the cities of Bamberg, Schweinfurt, Würzburg and Nuremberg. To the north it is bounded by the course of the Main and to the east by the Regnitz. Its southern boundary is formed by the Aisch and to the west the Main again and an extension of the line from Marktbreit via Uffenheim to Bad Windsheim.

== Statistics ==
=== Area by province ===
Total park area: 1,280 square kilometres (490 sq mi)

| Province | Area | | Proportion | |
|---|---|---|---|---|
| Middle Franconia | 634 | km^{2} | 49 | % |
| Upper Franconia | 216 | km^{2} | 17 | % |
| Lower Franconia | 430 | km^{2} | 34 | % |

=== Area by district ===
Total park area: 1,280 km^{2}

| District | Area | | Proportion | |
|---|---|---|---|---|
| Bamberg | 214 | km^{2} | 16 | .72% |
| Erlangen-Höchstadt | 104 | km^{2} | 8 | .13% |
| Haßberge | 176 | km^{2} | 13 | .75% |
| Kitzingen | 192 | km^{2} | 15 | .00% |
| Neustadt a.d. Aisch - Bad Windsheim | 536 | km^{2} | 41 | .88% |
| Schweinfurt | 58 | km^{2} | 4 | .52% |

=== Protected landscapes by province ===
Total area: 675 km^{2} (around 53% of the park)

| Province | Area | | Proportion | |
|---|---|---|---|---|
| Middle Franconia | 34 | km^{2} | 5 | % |
| Upper Franconia | 216 | km^{2} | 32 | % |
| Lower Franconia | 425 | km^{2} | 63 | % |

=== Ownership of the woodlands ===
Total area: 512.7 km^{2} (around 40% of the park)

| Ownership class | Area | | Proportion | |
|---|---|---|---|---|
| Federal forest | 0 | .8 km^{2} | 0 | % |
| Corporately owned forest | 145 | .5 km^{2} | 29 | % |
| Private forest | 190 | .4 km^{2} | 37 | % |
| State forest | 175 | .9 km^{2} | 34 | % |

== National park discussions ==
Since March 2007, there have been controversial discussions about the inclusion of parts of the northern Steigerwald Nature Park in UNESCO's World Heritage Programme by their conversion into a Steigerwald National Park. A study by the Federal Agency for Nature Conservation lists those parts of the Steigerwald that are considered particularly worthy of protection because of the presence of very rare stands of beech-forest and their great variety of species. According to this proposal around 11,000 hectares, which accounts for just under 9% of the national forest, should be converted into a national park. The interest groups of private and corporate forest owners, forestry and agriculture and people from across the political spectrum are trying to do this with particular regard to preventing the loss of jobs.

=== Proponents ===
One of the first and most famous proponents of the Steigerwald National Park is Bernhard Grzimek, along with the German forest scientist, Georg Sperber. At the end of April 2008, nature conservation clubs established the Friends of the Steigerwald National Park (Freundeskreis Pro Nationalpark Steigerwald), to collaboratively promote the national park idea. Within this grouping, nine regional and national interest groups are active, including the Federation for Nature Conservation in Bavaria, the State Federation for the Protection of Birds in Bavaria and the WWF Germany (as of 13 Nov 2010). Since early October 2009, the group has run an information office in the market town of Ebrach

=== Opponents ===
Shortly beforehand, opponents of the national park had founded Our Steigerwald (Unser Steigerwald e.V.). Its members include over 3,000 private individuals (as at July 2010), 17 organizations such as the Bavarian Forest Owners' Association, various regional groups of the Bavarian Farmers Association and the Forestry Association of Lower Franconia as well as 14 of the communities that are envisaged to be in the national park area (as of 13 Nov 2010). Instead of a national park, opponents are voting for the stepping-stone approach by the Bavarian State Forests: that the Ebrach Forestry Commission takes part of the forest area out of use and links these stepping stones in the state forestry areas into a network connected by corridors. The remaining forest area would continue to be cultivated.

=== Current situation ===
The Bavarian Environment Minister, Markus Söder, sees no future in a Steigerwald National Park as long as it is not supported by the general population. That this is currently not the case in the Steigerwald itself was stated by Söder in early November 2010 at the ceremony celebrating the 40th anniversary of the Bavarian Forest National Park.

== See also ==
- List of nature parks in Germany

== Maps ==
- Landesamt für Vermessung und Geoinformation Bayern: Naturpark Steigerwald - südlicher Teil. Umgebungskarte 1:50.000. Aischgrund, Bad Windsheim, Erlangen, Fürth, Kitzingen. Mit Wanderwegen, Radwanderwegen, Gitter für GPS-Nutzer. 6.3.2009. (ISBN 978-3-86038-426-8)
- Landesamt für Vermessung und Geoinformation Bavaria: Naturpark Steigerwald - nördlicher Teil. Umgebungskarte 1:50.000. Haßfurt, Schlüsselfeld, Kitzingen, Bamberg. Mit Wanderwegen, Radwanderwegen, Gitter für GPS-Nutzer. 6.3.2009. (ISBN 978-3-86038-428-2)

== Sources ==
- Georg Sperber & Thomas Stephan: Frankens Naturerbe - Buchenwälder im Steigerwald. Bamberg: Fränkischer Tag 2008. 176 Seiten. (ISBN 978-3-936897-62-3)
