= Scheinberg =

Scheinberg (Steigerwald)
- Location within Bavaria

Highest point
- Elevation: 498 m above sea level (NHN) (1,634 ft)
- Listing: Highest hill in the Steigerwald
- Coordinates: 49°36′51″N 10°17′14″E

Geography
- Location: Bavaria, Germany
- Parent range: Steigerwald

The Scheinberg is a hill, 498 m above NHN, and the highest point in the Steigerwald, a hill range in southern Germany. It lies northeast of Ippesheim in the county of Neustadt an der Aisch-Bad Windsheim in Middle Franconia. To the north runs the border with the Lower Franconian province of Kitzingen.
