= Mittlere Ebrach =

River in Germany

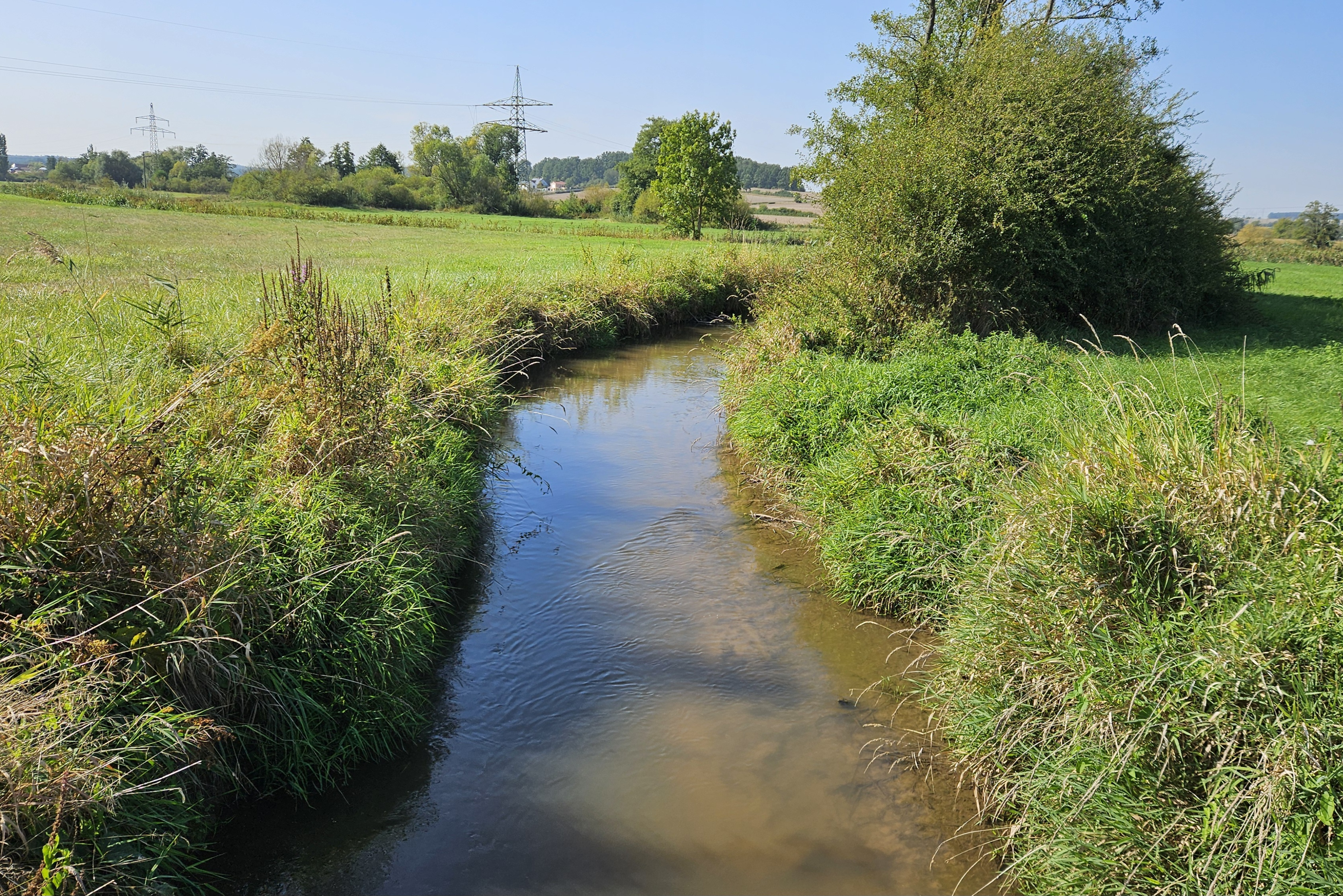
- The Mittlere Ebrach east of Burgebrach

Location
- Country: Germany
- State: Bavaria

Physical characteristics
- Mouth
  - location: Rauhe Ebrach
  - coordinates: 49.8328°N 10.7654°E
- Length: 29.5 km (18.3 mi)

Basin features
- Progression: Rauhe Ebrach→ Regnitz→ Main→ Rhine→ North Sea

Mittlere Ebrach (German pronunciation: [ˈmɪtləʁə ˈʔeːbʁax]; also: Mittelebrach) is a river of Bavaria, Germany.

The name translates to Mean or Middle Ebrach, in order to distinguish it from three other rivers called Ebrach nearby: the Reiche Ebrach, the Ebrach (also called Geiselwinder Ebrach, tributary of the Reiche Ebrach, not to be confused with the Attel tributary Ebrach), and the Rauhe Ebrach.

The Mittlere Ebrach flows into the Rauhe Ebrach near Burgebrach.

== See also ==
- List of rivers of Bavaria
