= Aurach =

Aurach may refer to:

== Places ==
- Aurach, Germany, municipality in the district of Ansbach in Bavaria in Germany
- Aurach bei Kitzbühel, municipality in Kitzbühel District in the Kitzbühel Alps in the Austrian state of Tyrol
- Aurach am Hongar, municipality in the district of Vöcklabruck in the Austrian state of Upper Austria

== Rivers ==
- Aurach (Regnitz, Mittelfranken), in Middle Franconia, Bavaria, Germany, tributary of the Regnitz
- Aurach (Regnitz, Oberfranken), in Upper Franconia, Bavaria, Germany, tributary of the Regnitz
- Aurach (Rednitz), in Bavaria, Germany, tributary of the Rednitz
- Aurach (Ager), in Upper Austria, tributary of the Ager
