= Franconian Keuper-Lias Plains =

Natural region

Coordinates: 49.4500°N 10.8000°E

The Franconian Keuper-Lias Plains or Franconian Keuper-Lias Lands (German: Fränkische Keuper-Lias-Land) are a major natural region in the South German Scarplands in Upper Franconia and to a lesser extent in the north, in the Thuringian district of Hildburghausen. As the name indicates, the term embraces both the Keuper landscapes (including the well-known parts of the Keuper Upland Haßberge, Steigerwald and Franconian Heights) and lias landscapes (Black Jurassic) in Franconia. In addition, the fore-land of the Franconian Jura (Vorland der Fränkischen Alb), in which part of the Brown Jurassic occurs, as well as parts of the former volcanic region of Heldburger Gangschar belong to this region.

The highest elevation in the area is the unique Hesselberg (689 m) immediately north of the crater of the Nördlinger Ries which separates the Swabian from the Franconian Jura.

== Location and boundaries ==
The Franconian Keuper-Lias Plains are bounded to the north and west by the muschelkalk Gäu landscapes of the Main-Franconian Plateaux, to the southwest, of which, are the Gäu Plateaus. In the southwest, are the geologically and topographically similar Swabian Keuper-Lias Plains.

To the east, the landscape transitions into the Malm Plateau of the Franconian Jura, to the northeast are the Upper Palatine-Upper Main Hills (especially the Upper Main Hills) as a buffer zone between the Franconian Jura and the Upper Palatine-Bavarian Forest.

The conurbation of Nuremberg, with its outlying towns of Fürth and Erlangen, lie roughly in the centre of the Franconian Keuper-Lias Plains. In the north, is the city of Bamberg and, in the north-northeastern extremity, is the town of Coburg.

== Natural divisions ==
The Franconian Keuper-Lias Plains are part of the South German Scarplands and are further divided into natural regions as follows:
(in brackets the predominant rock keuper (K), lias (L), and dogger (D))

- 11 (=D59) Franconian Keuper-Lias Plains (Fränkisches Keuper-Lias-Land)
  - 110 Foreland of the Southern Franconian Jura (Vorland der südlichen Frankenalb) (L, D) - up to 689 m (Hesselberg), at Schlossberg 606.7 m, at Flüglinger Berg 641.3 m
  - 111 Foreland of the Middle Franconian Jura (Vorland der mittleren Frankenalb) (L, D) - up to 595 m (Dillberg), at Buchberg 591 m
  - 112 Foreland of the Northern Franconian Jura (Vorland der nördlichen Frankenalb) (L, D)
  - 113 Middle Franconian Basin (Mittelfränkisches Becken) (K)
  - 114 Franconian Heights (K) - up to 554 m
  - 115 Steigerwald (K) - up to 499 m
  - 116 Haßberge (K) - up to 512 m
  - 117 Itz-Baunach Upland (Itz-Baunach-Hügelland) (K, L) - up to 467 m
