= Stegaurach =

- Municipality
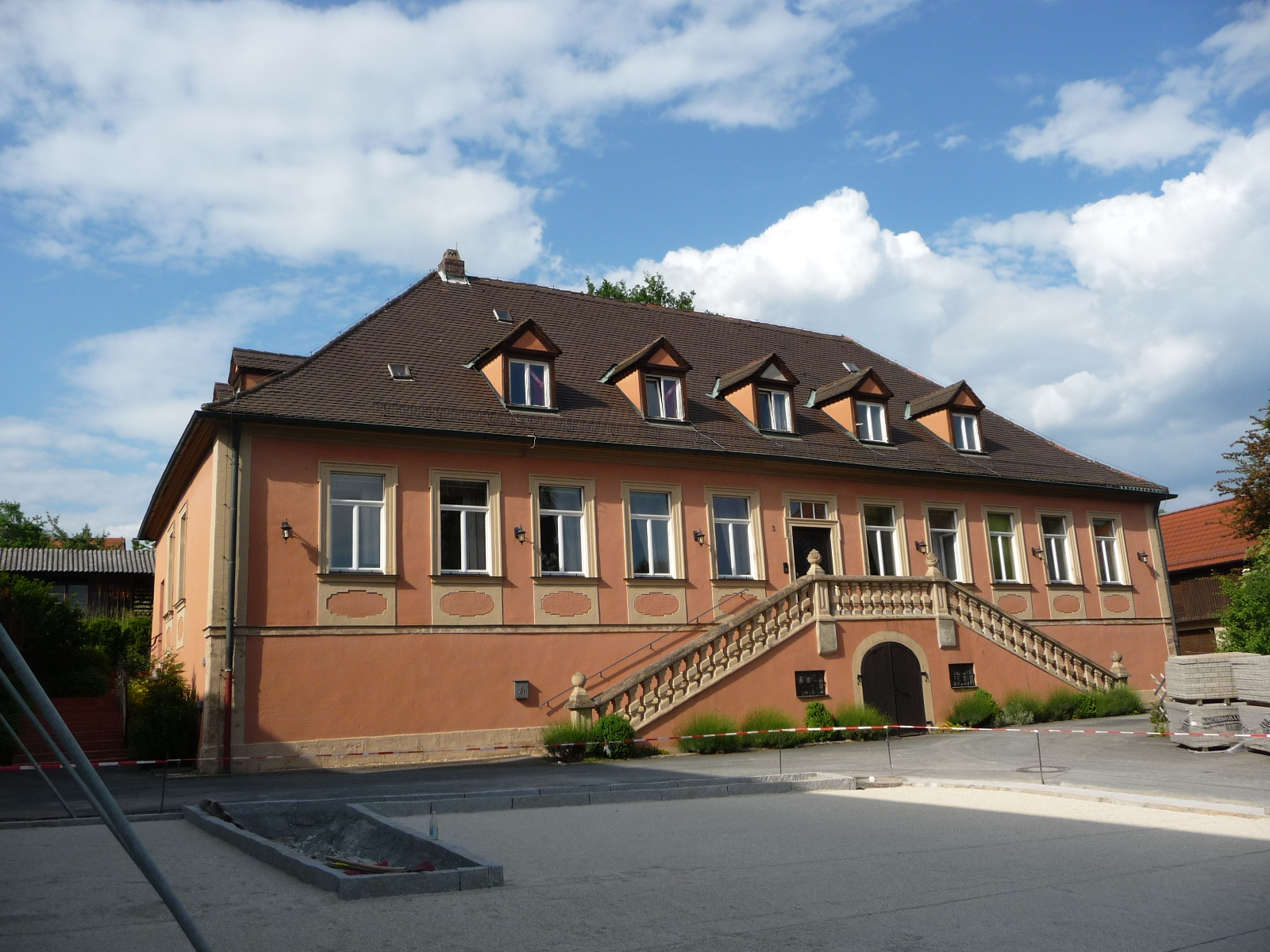
- Böttinger Manor

- Coat of arms

- Location of Stegaurach within Bamberg district
- Interactive map of Stegaurach
- Location within Germany Location within Bavaria
- Coordinates: 49°52′12″N 10°46′56″E
- Country: Germany
- State: Bavaria
- Admin. region: Oberfranken
- District: Bamberg
- Subdivisions: 11 Ortsteile

Government
  - Mayor (2020–26): Thilo Wagner (FW)

Area
  - Total: 23.89 km^{2} (9.22 sq mi)
- Elevation: 268 m (879 ft)

Population (2025-12-31)
  - Total: 6,898
  - Density: 288.7/km^{2} (747.8/sq mi)
- Time zone: UTC+01:00 (CET)
  - Summer (DST): UTC+02:00 (CEST)
- Postal codes: 96135
- Dialling codes: 0951
- Vehicle registration: BA
- Website: www.stegaurach.de

Stegaurach is a municipality and a village in the Upper Franconian district of Bamberg.

== Geography ==
The community lies in the valley of the Aurach, about 4 km west of Bamberg. Stegaurach lies in the Upper Franconia-West region.

=== Constituent communities ===
Stegaurach’s main and namesake centre is by far the biggest of its Ortsteile with a population of 7,134 (2023 projection). The community furthermore has these outlying centres, each given here with its own population figure and dialectal name where there is one:

- Debring (village) 484
- Dellerhof (farm) 17
- Dellern (farm) 32
- Hartlanden (village) 410, locally “Hädländ”
- Höfen (village) 220, locally “Höfn”
- Kaifeck (hamlet) 12
- Knottenhof (small hamlet) 5, locally “Knonhof”
- Kreuzschuh (village) 210, locally “Kreutschi”
- Mühlendorf (village) 807, locally “Müllndäff”
- Mutzershof (hamlet) 67
- Seehöflein (village) 69
- Unteraurach (village) 256, locally “Ündäaurich”
- Waizendorf (village) 505, locally “Waizndäff”

The village Stegaurach is known in the local speech as “Aurich”.

The community also has 5 traditional rural land units, known in German as Gemarkungen, named Hartlanden, Höfen, Mühlendorf, Stegaurach and Birkacher Wald, four of which (all but the last, which is a woodland) have the same names as four of the constituent communities (it is traditional for a Gemarkung to be named after a town or village lying nearby).

== History ==
Stegaurach belonged to the High Monastery at Bamberg. Stegaurach was actually part of the hereditary estate administration, a great deal of which was nevertheless made up of the High Monastery’s property or its Mediaten. Since the Reichsdeputationshauptschluss of 1803, the community has belonged to Bavaria.

=== Population development ===
Within municipal limits, 3,935 inhabitants were counted in 1970, 4,958 in 1987 and 6,382 in 2000. In 2005 it was 6,747. In the next year the population figure climbed sharply, giving Stegaurach a population of 6,841 on 31 December 2006.

== Politics ==
The mayor is Thilo Wagner (Free Voters), first elected in 2014 and re-elected in 2020.

The community council is made up of 20 members, listed here by party or voter community affiliation, and also with the number of seats that each holds:

- Freie Wähler – FL: 8 seats
- CSU: 5 seats
- GRÜNE – Bürgerstimme: 4 seats
- Bürgernahe Liste (BNL): 2 seats
- SPD: 1 seat

In 1999, municipal tax revenue, converted to euros, amounted to €2,573,000 of which business taxes (net) amounted to €263,000.

== Economy and infrastructure ==
According to official statistics, there were no workers on the social welfare contribution rolls working in producing businesses or trade and transport. In other areas, 313 workers on the social welfare contribution rolls were employed, and 2,120 such workers worked from home. In processing businesses there were three businesses, and in construction 7. Furthermore, in 1999, there were 46 agricultural operations with a working area of 795 ha, of which 571 ha was cropland and 223 ha was meadowland.

== Education ==
In 1999, the following institutions existed in Stegaurach:

- 225 kindergarten places with 228 children
- Elementary school with 25 teachers and 470 pupils

== Town twinning ==
- France ; Onet-le-Château, (Aveyron)
