= Dombühl =

- Municipality
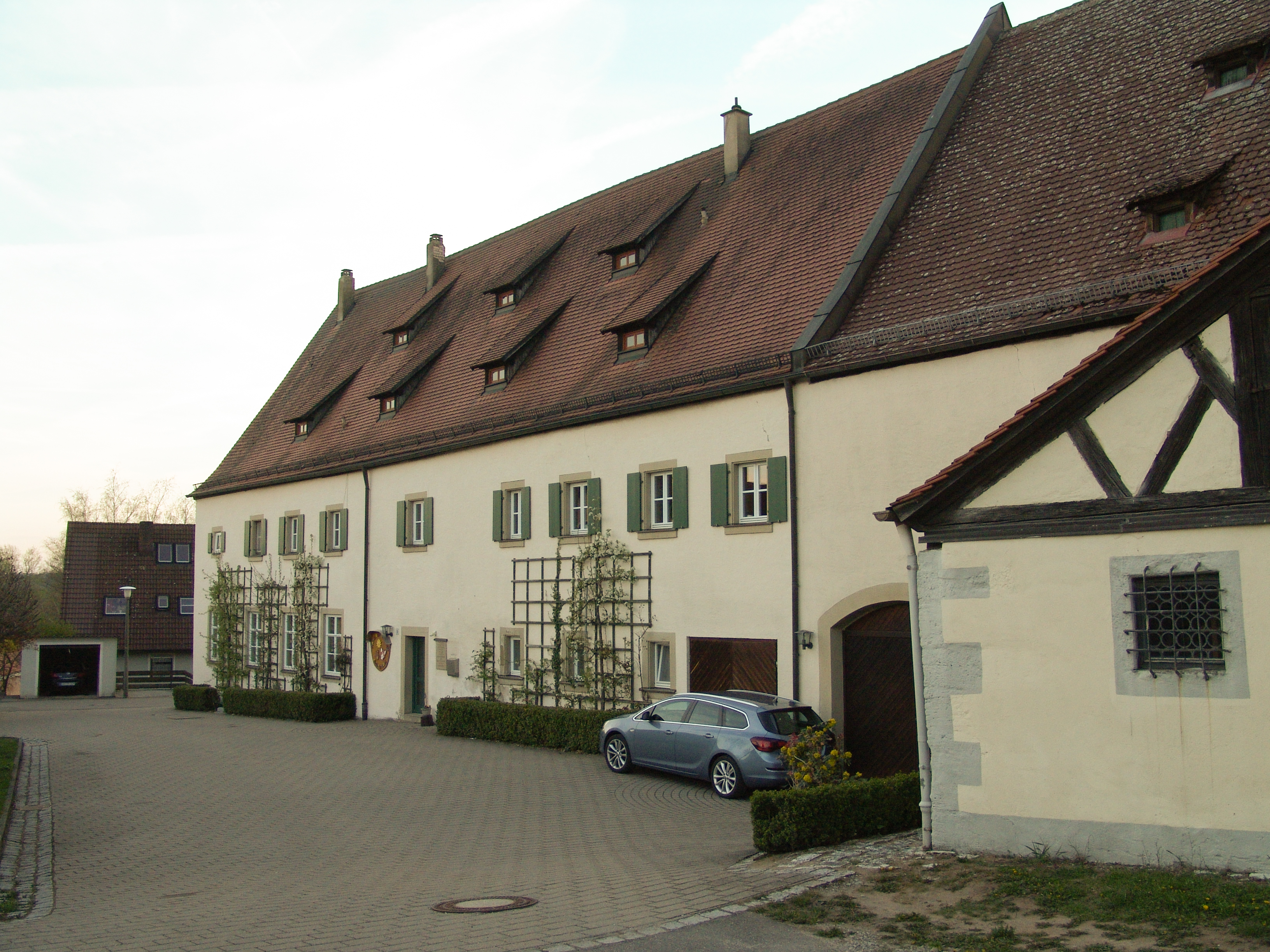
- Sulz Abbey

- Coat of arms

- Location of Dombühl within Ansbach district
- Interactive map of Dombühl
- Location within Germany Location within Bavaria
- Coordinates: 49°15′12″N 10°17′15″E
- Country: Germany
- State: Bavaria
- Admin. region: Mittelfranken
- District: Ansbach
- Municipal assoc.: Schillingsfürst
- Subdivisions: 12 Ortsteile

Government
  - Mayor (2020–26): Jürgen Geier (FW)

Area
  - Total: 17.90 km^{2} (6.91 sq mi)
- Elevation: 470 m (1,540 ft)

Population (2025-12-31)
  - Total: 2,065
  - Density: 115.4/km^{2} (298.8/sq mi)
- Time zone: UTC+01:00 (CET)
  - Summer (DST): UTC+02:00 (CEST)
- Postal codes: 91601
- Dialling codes: 09868
- Vehicle registration: AN
- Website: www.dombuehl.de

Dombühl is a municipality in the district of Ansbach in Bavaria in Germany.

== Division of the municipality ==
Dombühl has eight districts:

- Baimhofen
- Binsenweiler
- Bortenberg
- Dombühl
- Höfen (Dombühl)
- Höfstettermühle
- Kloster Sulz
- Ziegelhaus (Dombühl)
