= Ebrach (Reiche Ebrach) =

River in Bavaria, Germany

Ebrach Geiselwinder Ebrach
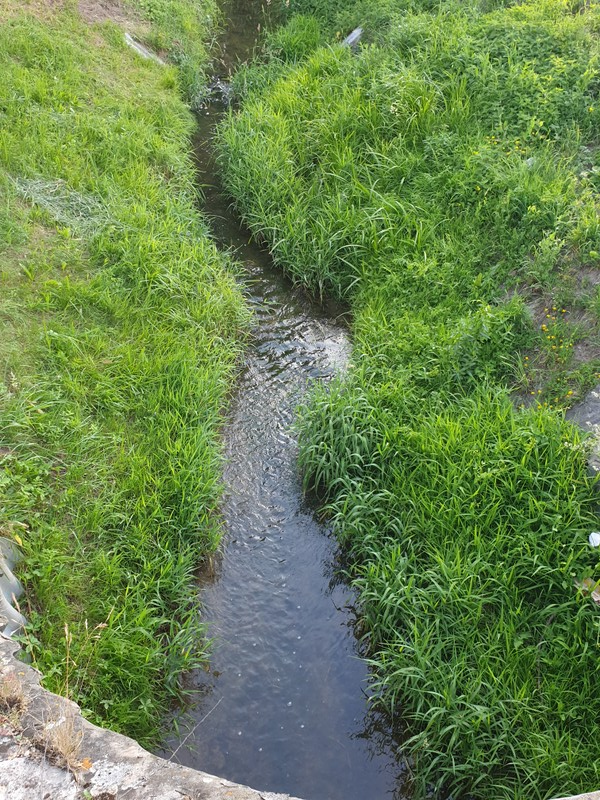
- Ebrach near Geiselwind

Location
- Country: Germany
- State: Bavaria

Physical characteristics
- Source
  - location: confluence of the Ebrachbach and the Haselbach in Geiselwind
  - coordinates: 49.7730°N 10.4648°E
- Mouth
  - location: West of Geiselwind into the Reiche Ebrach
  - coordinates: 49.7698°N 10.5096°E

Basin features
- Progression: Reiche Ebrach→ Regnitz→ Main→ Rhine→ North Sea

The Ebrach (German pronunciation: [ˈeːbʁax]; also: Geiselwinder Ebrach) is a river of Bavaria, Germany.

The Ebrach springs from the confluence of the Ebrachbach and the Haselbach in Geiselwind. It discharges west of Geiselwind from the right into the Reiche Ebrach.

== See also ==
- List of rivers of Bavaria
