= Diebach =

- Municipality
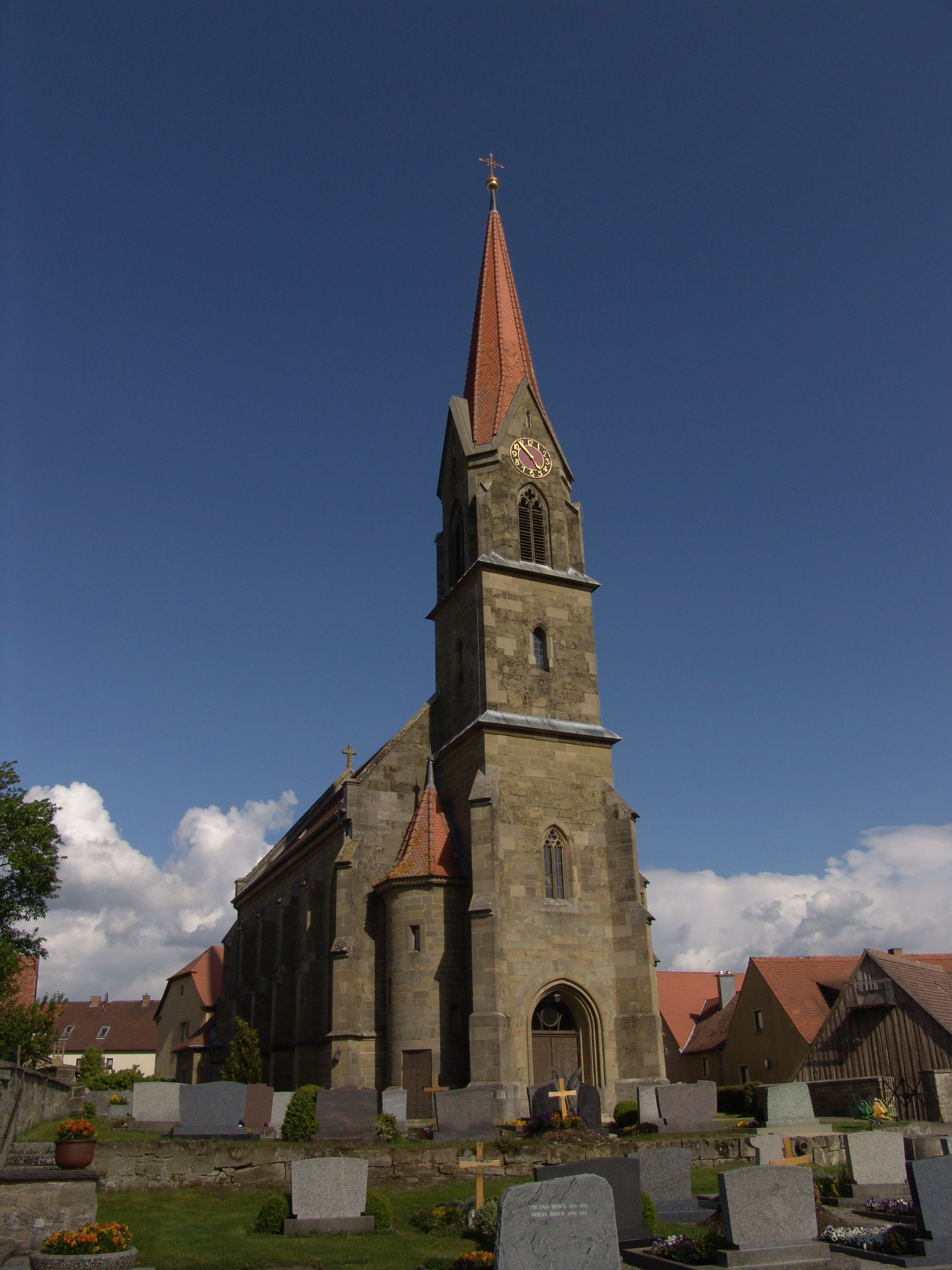
- Church of Saint Bartholomew

- Coat of arms

- Location of Diebach within Ansbach district
- Interactive map of Diebach
- Location within Germany Location within Bavaria
- Coordinates: 49°17′N 10°10′E
- Country: Germany
- State: Bavaria
- Admin. region: Mittelfranken
- District: Ansbach
- Municipal assoc.: Schillingsfürst

Government
  - Mayor (2020–26): Gabriele Hofacker

Area
  - Total: 22.34 km^{2} (8.63 sq mi)
- Elevation: 394 m (1,293 ft)

Population (2025-12-31)
  - Total: 1,156
  - Density: 51.75/km^{2} (134.0/sq mi)
- Time zone: UTC+01:00 (CET)
  - Summer (DST): UTC+02:00 (CEST)
- Postal codes: 91583
- Dialling codes: 09868
- Vehicle registration: AN
- Website: www.diebach.de

Diebach (German pronunciation: [ˈdiːbax]) is a municipality in the district of Ansbach in Bavaria in Germany.
