= Wörnitz =

- Municipality
- Coat of arms

- Location of Wörnitz within Ansbach district
- Interactive map of Wörnitz
- Location within Germany Location within Bavaria
- Coordinates: 49°15′N 10°15′E
- Country: Germany
- State: Bavaria
- Admin. region: Mittelfranken
- District: Ansbach
- Municipal assoc.: Schillingsfürst
- Subdivisions: 4 Ortsteile

Government
  - Mayor (2020–26): Friederike Sonnemann

Area
  - Total: 24.45 km^{2} (9.44 sq mi)
- Elevation: 466 m (1,529 ft)

Population (2025-12-31)
  - Total: 1,879
  - Density: 76.85/km^{2} (199.0/sq mi)
- Time zone: UTC+01:00 (CET)
  - Summer (DST): UTC+02:00 (CEST)
- Postal codes: 91637
- Dialling codes: 09868
- Vehicle registration: AN
- Website: www.woernitz.de

Wörnitz (German pronunciation: [ˈvœʁnɪts]) is a municipality in the district of Ansbach, in Bavaria, Germany. It is situated on the river Wörnitz, west of Ansbach.
