= Oberschwarzach =

- Municipality
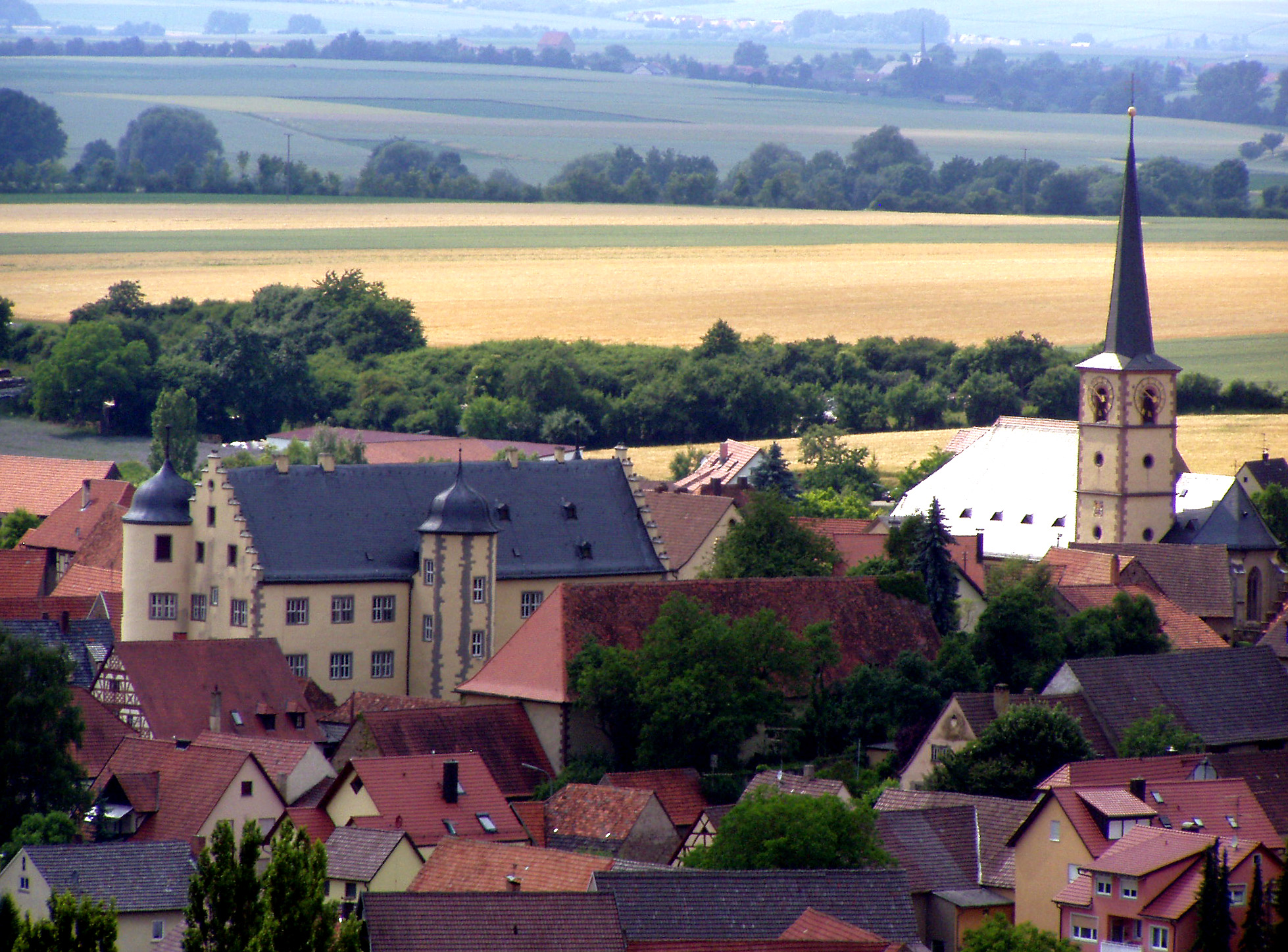
- Center of the town of Oberschwarzach

- Coat of arms

- Location of Oberschwarzach within Schweinfurt district
- Interactive map of Oberschwarzach
- Location within Germany Location within Bavaria
- Coordinates: 49°52′N 10°25′E
- Country: Germany
- State: Bavaria
- Admin. region: Unterfranken
- District: Schweinfurt
- Municipal assoc.: Gerolzhofen

Government
  - Mayor (2020–26): Manfred Schötz (CSU)

Area
  - Total: 24.51 km^{2} (9.46 sq mi)
- Elevation: 278 m (912 ft)

Population (2025-12-31)
  - Total: 1,430
  - Density: 58.3/km^{2} (151/sq mi)
- Time zone: UTC+01:00 (CET)
  - Summer (DST): UTC+02:00 (CEST)
- Postal codes: 97516
- Dialling codes: 09382
- Vehicle registration: SW
- Website: www.oberschwarzach.de

Oberschwarzach is a municipality in the district of Schweinfurt in Bavaria, Germany.
