= Ebrach =

- Municipality
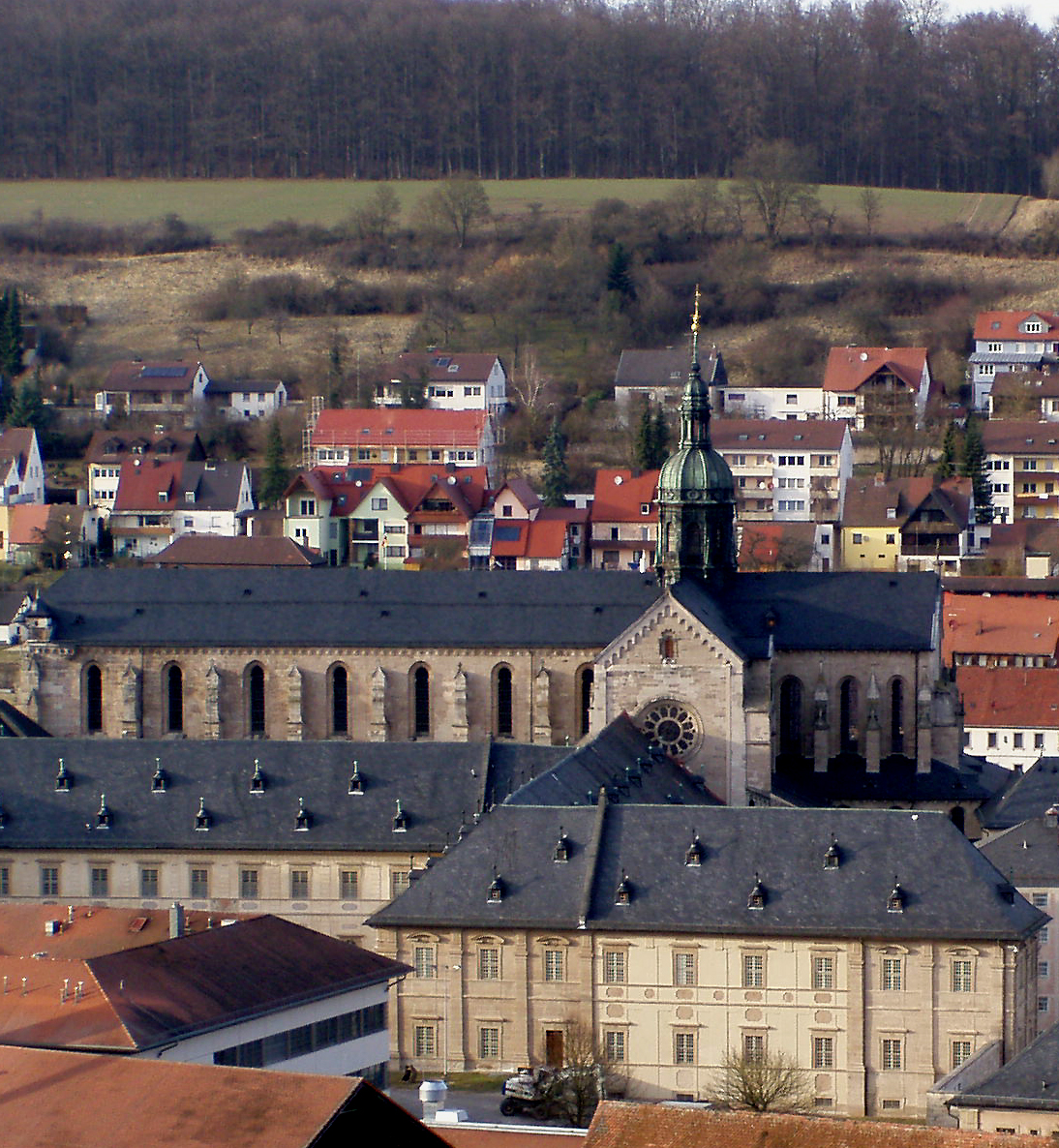
- Ebrach

- Coat of arms

- Location of Ebrach within Bamberg district
- Interactive map of Ebrach
- Location within Germany Location within Bavaria
- Coordinates: 49°51′N 10°30′E
- Country: Germany
- State: Bavaria
- Admin. region: Oberfranken
- District: Bamberg
- Municipal assoc.: Ebrach

Government
  - Mayor (2020–26): Daniel Vinzens

Area
  - Total: 32.26 km^{2} (12.46 sq mi)
- Elevation: 330 m (1,080 ft)

Population (2025-12-31)
  - Total: 1,827
  - Density: 56.63/km^{2} (146.7/sq mi)
- Time zone: UTC+01:00 (CET)
  - Summer (DST): UTC+02:00 (CEST)
- Postal codes: 96157
- Dialling codes: 09553
- Vehicle registration: BA
- Website: www.ebrach.de

Ebrach (German pronunciation: [ˈeːbʁax]) is a municipality with market rights in the Upper Franconian district of Bamberg and the seat of the Verwaltungsgemeinschaft (municipal association) of Ebrach.

== Geography ==
Ebrach lies between Bamberg in the east and Würzburg in the west. It is located in the Steigerwald on the river Mittlere Ebrach.

=== Constituent communities ===
Ebrach’s main and namesake centre is by far the biggest of its Ortsteile with a population of 1,078. The market community furthermore has these outlying centres, each given here with its own population figure:

- Buch bei Ebrach: 55
- Eberau bei Ebrach: 122
- Großbirkach: 68
- Großgressingen: 251
- Hof bei Ebrach: 15
- Kleinbirkach: 36
- Kleingressingen: 40
- Meierei bei Ebrach: 7
- Neudorf bei Ebrach: 93
- Schmerb: 4
- Winkelhof: 6

The community also has five traditional rural land units, known in German as Gemarkungen, named Buch, Ebrach, Großbirkach, Großgressingen and Neudorf bei Ebrach, the same names as five of the constituent communities (it is traditional for a Gemarkung to be named after a town or village lying nearby).

== History ==
The former Cistercian Kloster Ebrach was founded in 1127 as one of the first Cistercian monasteries east of the Rhine by Berno and Richwin von Eberau, Frankish noblemen. In 1147, twelve monks from the mother monastery, Morimond, moved here. In 1200, Abbot Hermann I set to work on building the church, which was finished in 1280. It is 86 m long was built in the Gothic style. More than 50 windows, 26 altars and, above the portal, a rose window adorn the building. The windows were newly painted in 1887. The organ, with its 36 stops, is hailed as a masterwork. The abbey was dissolved in 1803 in the course of Secularization. Since the Reichsdeputationshauptschluss of 1803, the community has belonged to Bavaria. Ebrach Abbey only fell under direct Imperial authority once it had been shut down. Until 1803, this had been successfully disputed by the Hochstift of Würzburg. The abbey church became a parish church. Since 1851, the abbey buildings have served as a prison, nowadays known as Justizvollzugsanstalt Ebrach.

== Demographics ==
Within municipal limits, 1,403 inhabitants were counted in 1900, 2,471 in 1970, 1,774 in 1987 and 2,017 in 2000. By 30 June 2007, however, the figure had fallen to 1,839.

== Governance ==
The mayor is Daniel Vinzens, elected in March 2020.

The community council is made up of 12 members, listed here by party or voter community affiliation, and also with the number of seats that each holds, since the 2020 local elections:

- Ebracher Neue Liste: 4 seats
- CSU: 3 seats
- Freie Wähler Ebrach und Umland: 2 seats
- SPD: 2 seats
- Junge Ebracher Liste: 1 seat

=== Coat of arms ===
Ebrach’s arms might heraldically be described thus: Party per fess downwards Or and gules, in Or a boar sable springing, in his mouth an abbot’s crozier argent bendwise, in gules a bend argent wavy.

=== Town twinning ===
- Eisbach in the Steiermark, Austria
- Georgenthal in Thuringia

== Economy ==
In 1999, municipal tax revenue, converted to euros, amounted to €969,000 of which business taxes (net) amounted to €353,000.

Owing to the community’s location in the Steigerwald, wood is a significant economic factor.

According to official statistics, there were 23 workers on the social welfare contribution rolls working in agriculture or forestry, 330 in producing businesses in 1998, and in trade and transport 36. In other areas, 100 workers on the social welfare contribution rolls were employed, and 476 such workers worked from home. In processing businesses and in construction there was one business each. Furthermore, in 1999, there were 52 agricultural operations with a working area of 1 077 ha, of which 766 ha was cropland and 310 ha was meadowland.

== Infrastructure ==
- Naturbad (a swimming pool fed by a natural water source, reopened 2005)
- Justizvollzugsanstalt Ebrach

=== Transport ===
Ebrach lies on Bundesstraße 22. The railway line to Bamberg was abandoned and has since been torn up.

== Culture and sightseeing ==
=== Sightseeing ===
- Ebrach Abbey
- St. Johanniskirche (church) in Großbirkach

=== Regular events ===
- Ebrach Summer Music Festival
- Ebracher Kirchweih (church consecration festival)

== Education ==
In 1999, the following institutions existed in Ebrach:

- 50 kindergarten places with 36 children
- Primary school with 8 teachers and 142 pupils
- Steigerwaldschule (state Realschule) with 35 teachers and 682 students

== Notable people ==
=== Sons and daughters of the town ===
- Max Jobst (b. 9 February 1908, missing since January 1943), German composer
- Heinrich Aigner (b 25 May 1924; d. 24 March 1988), German politician (CSU), MdB, MdEP

=== Persons connected with the community ===
- Georg Sperber (b. 1933 in Nuremberg), forester and specialized book author, lives in Ebrach. He was from 1972 to 1998 leader of the Ebrach Forest Office.

== Other ==
- In June 2003, Ebrach was a staging point for the Deutschland Tour.
