= Bert Fegg's Nasty Book for Boys and Girls =

Book by Terry Jones

- The cover of Bert Fegg's; Nasty Book (1974 edition)
- Author: Terry Jones and Michael Palin
- Illustrator: Martin Honeysett, Lolly Honeysett, Frank Bellamy, Paul Buckle
- Cover artist: Lolly Honeysett
- Language: English
- Genre: Humour
- Publisher: Methuen
- Publication date: 1974
- Publication place: United Kingdom
- English publication date: Print (hardcover)
- ISBN: 0-413-32740-X
- OCLC: 16296623

Bert Fegg's Nasty Book for Boys and Girls is a humorous book first published by Methuen in 1974 which purports to have been written by a psychopathic character, Dr. Fegg. In fact, the book is the work of Terry Jones and Michael Palin, who adapted a range of material from scripts written for the television comedy series Monty Python's Flying Circus. Some material was later used in the duo's later TV series, Ripping Yarns (1975–78). The first edition was sold bearing a sticker on the front cover which read "A Monty Python Educational Product".

The book satirises elements of educational text books, as well as annuals, which were popular hardcover publications for children featuring short stories, comic strips, and games, often based upon television series and films of the day.

== Style of humour ==
The book uses the characteristic absurdist humour similar to Monty Python and relies on the use of non-sequitur, parody, anarchic humour, juvenile references to bodily functions, and black comedy-style descriptions of gory violence for comedic effect. A fictional character, Dr. Bert Fegg, is presented as the author of the book. His bloodthirsty, psychopathic character is depicted in constant conflict with the publishers, as they attempt to raise the moral tone of the book and censor violent content.

The exchange between author and publishers is presented through textual interjections such as "That's enough – the Publishers", in the style often used in the satirical magazine Private Eye. Dr. Fegg's angry comments are scrawled handwriting printed on the pages.

Recurring jokes throughout the book include a number of parody advertisements for exotic household gadgets, appearances by the sinister West Bromley Fighting Haddock, and passing references to "the Bournemouth Killings".

== Authors and contributors ==
Python writers Terry Jones and Michael Palin wrote the content, with artwork provided by several British illustrators. Contributors to the book include British comics artist Frank Bellamy (A Cowboy Story), cartoonists Martin Honeysett and Lolly Honeysett, and Paul Buckle, an illustrator who worked on a number of instructional football skills books in the 1970s.

== Content ==
Among the topics covered in the book are:

The West Bromley Fighting Haddock

- The Wonderful World of Nature – descriptions of several fictional animals, such as the Patagonian Bursting Rabbit and the West Bromley Fighting Haddock
- Across the Andes by Frog – a burlesque of a travel diary in a mock-heroic style; this material was later used in the TV series Ripping Yarns (1977)
- Soccer My Way by the Supremes – a parody of football tactics books featuring the popular singing groups the Supremes and Smokey Robinson and the Miracles, illustrated by Paul Buckle
- Interesting Machines – illustrated in the style of Heath Robinson, this page describes a range of fantastical devices including the "Tally-Ho" Automatic Bed Wetter and the "Hygena" Automatic Nose Picker.
- The Famous Five Go Pillaging – a short story which parodies the writing style of Enid Blyton; five children witness the collapse of Roman imperialism and their friends and family are slaughtered by 9000 invading Vikings.
- Great Men of History – in fact a collection of nonsensical poems about three women: Queen Elizabeth I, Queen Boadicea and Lady Godiva
- A Cowboy Story – a pastiche of a Western comic strip, in which cowboy "Kid" Masterton's horse develops bronchial pneumonia and is taken to a clinic for treatment; illustrations are by British comics artist Frank Bellamy.
- Aladdin and his Terrible Problem – a humorous pantomime script following the exploits of Aladdin and his sidekick, Pisso the Alcoholic Dog. The script ends abruptly with "Curtain. End of Act Two. Theatre goes out of business." The original hardcover featured a page of paper dolls of the play's characters that, in theory, could be cut out and used to perform the play.
- How to Destroy this Book – a final exhortation by Dr. Fegg to his young readers to wanton destruction, censored by the publishers.
- The original UK edition also included references to a faux contest whereby readers were invited to look for a "deliferate mistale" [sic] located "somewhat" in the book.
- The book climaxes with a two-page, gory illustration of Bert Fegg chopping open a monster with an axe (presented in the style of Terry Gilliam's animations), followed by profuse apologies by the book's publishers and a final scrawled rant by Fegg.

== Later editions ==
Expanded and revised editions of the book appeared as Dr. Fegg's Nasty Book of Knowledge in the US in 1976 and Dr. Fegg's Encyclopeadia (sic) of all World Knowledge, in the UK in 1984.

== Bibliography ==
- Bert Fegg's Nasty Book for Boys and Girls, with Terry Jones (1974) ISBN 0-413-32740-X
- Dr. Fegg's Nasty Book of Knowledge, with Terry Jones (1976) ISBN 0-425-03084-9
- Bert Fegg's Encyclopeadia (sic) of all World Knowledge, with Terry Jones (1984) ISBN 0-413-56430-4
