= Schillingsfürst =

- Town
- Coat of arms

- Location of Schillingsfürst within Ansbach district
- Interactive map of Schillingsfürst
- Location within Germany Location within Bavaria
- Coordinates: 49°16′N 10°16′E
- Country: Germany
- State: Bavaria
- Admin. region: Mittelfranken
- District: Ansbach
- Municipal assoc.: Schillingsfürst
- Subdivisions: 10 Ortsteile

Government
  - Mayor (2020–26): Michael Trzybinski

Area
  - Total: 27.5 km^{2} (10.6 sq mi)
- Elevation: 516 m (1,693 ft)

Population (2025-12-31)
  - Total: 2,786
  - Density: 101/km^{2} (262/sq mi)
- Time zone: UTC+01:00 (CET)
  - Summer (DST): UTC+02:00 (CEST)
- Postal codes: 91583
- Dialling codes: 09868
- Vehicle registration: AN
- Website: www.schillingsfuerst.de

Schillingsfürst (German pronunciation: [ˈʃɪlɪŋsˌfʏʁst]) is a town in the district of Ansbach, in Bavaria, Germany. It is situated 12 km southeast of Rothenburg ob der Tauber, and 23 km west of Ansbach.

Schillingsfürst castle (Schloss Schillingsfürst) is the home of the princely Hohenlohe-Schillingsfürst family.

== History ==
In 1472, the County of Schillingsfürst was founded by Godfrey IV, son of Cratos V, Count of Weikersheim, when he and his brother, Cratos VI, divided Weikersheim between them.

== Notable people ==
- The Bavarian Lieutenant General and Acting War Minister Hugo Ritter von Bosch (1782–1865) was born in Schillingsfürst.

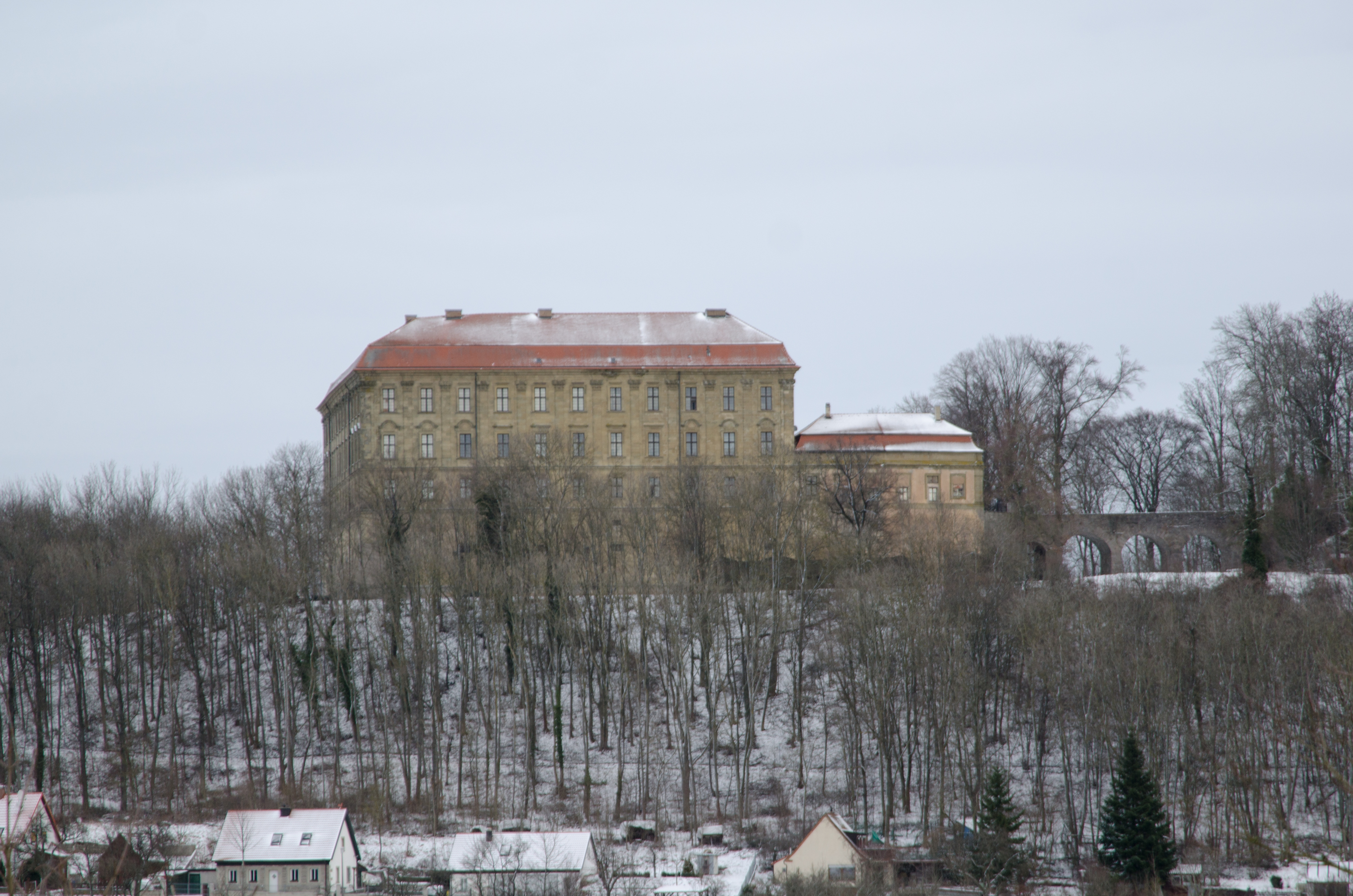
Schillingsfürst Castle of the Princes of Hohenlohe

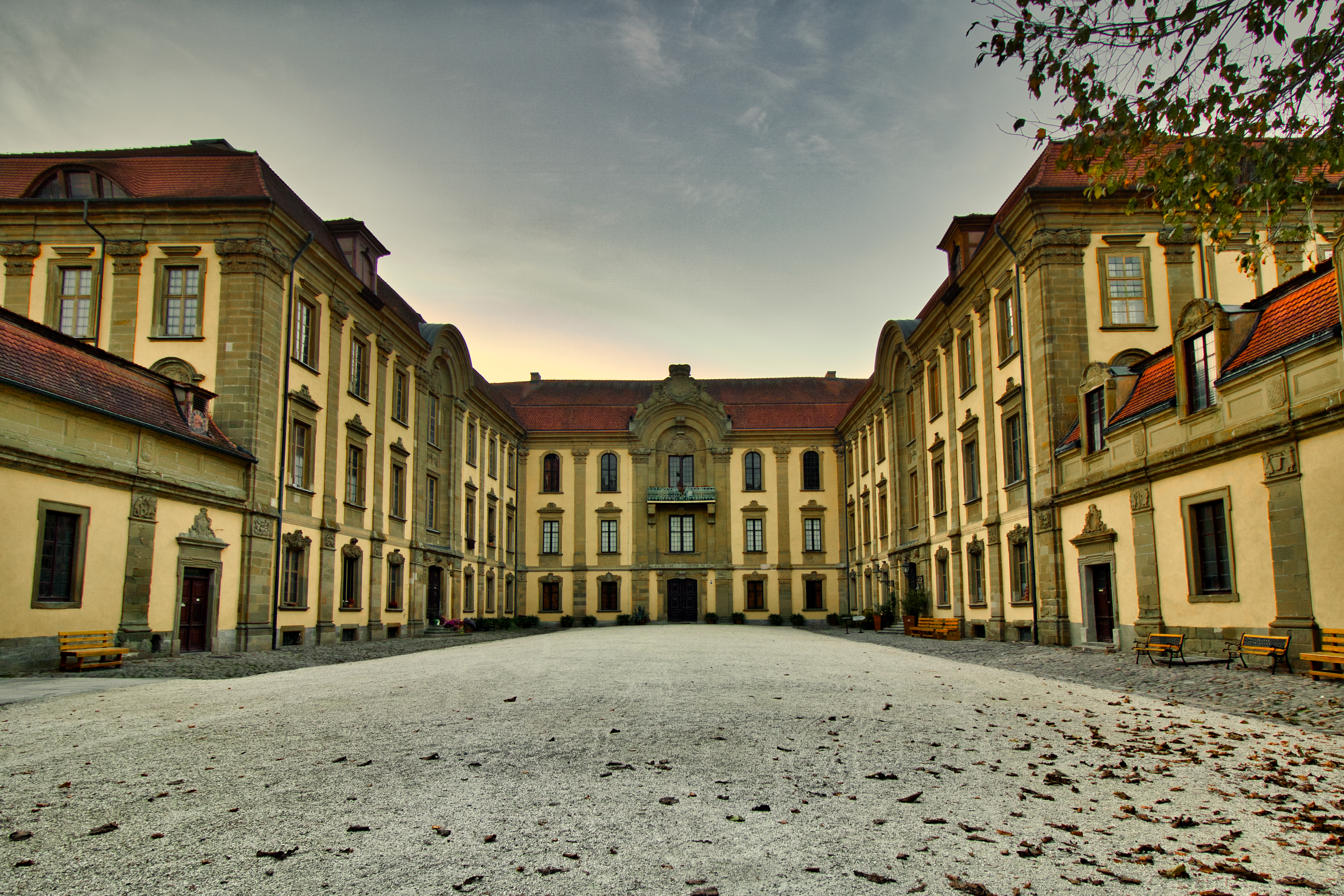
Courtyard
