= Rauhe Ebrach =

River in Germany

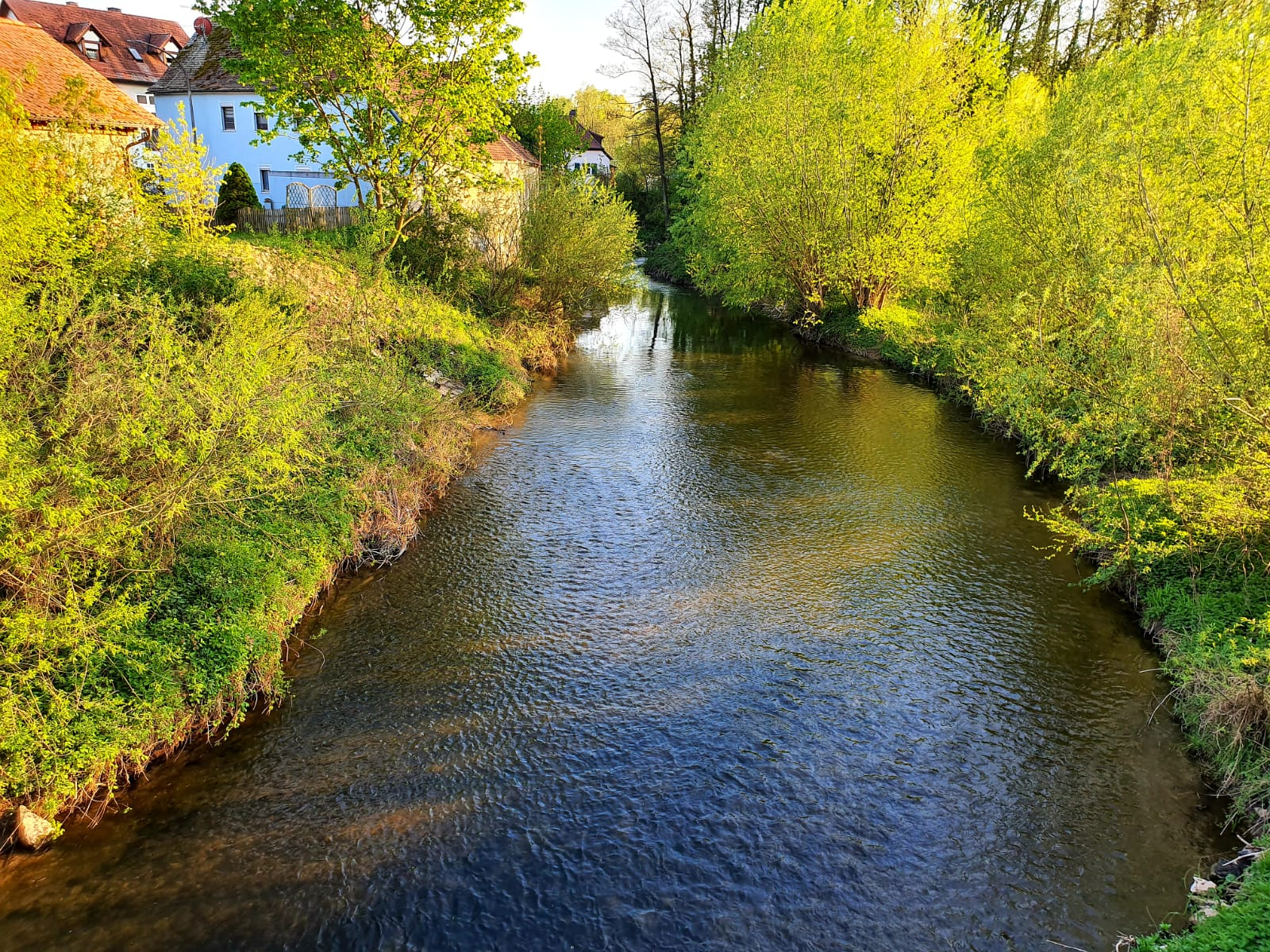
- The Rauhe Ebrach north of Pettstadt, view toward the east

Location
- Country: Germany
- State: Bavaria

Physical characteristics
- Mouth
  - location: Regnitz
  - coordinates: 49.8393°N 10.9388°E
- Length: 47.3 km (29.4 mi)
- Basin size: 324 km^{2} (125 sq mi)

Basin features
- Progression: Regnitz→ Main→ Rhine→ North Sea

Rauhe Ebrach (German pronunciation: [ˈʁaʊə ˈʔeːbʁax]) is a river of Bavaria, Germany. It flows into the Regnitz near Pettstadt.

== See also ==
- List of rivers of Bavaria
