= Reiche Ebrach =

River in Germany

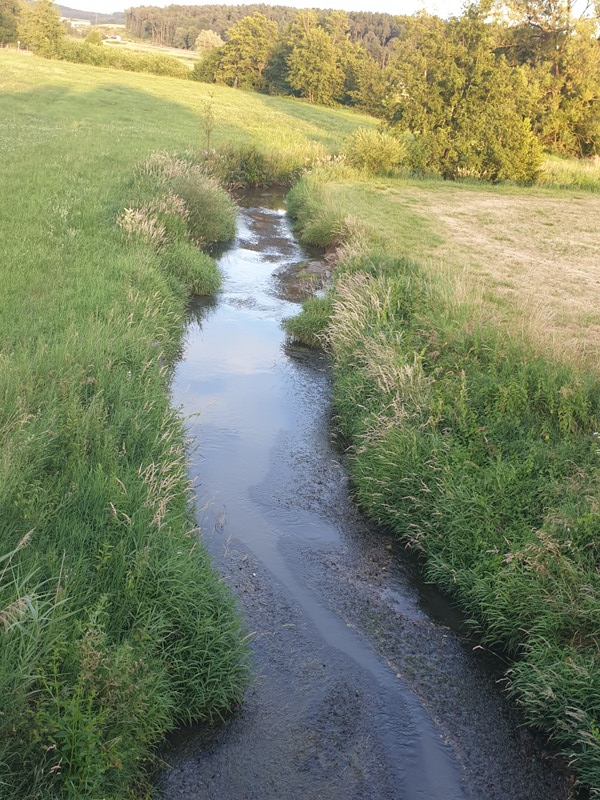
- Reiche Ebrach near Schlüsselfeld

Location
- Country: Germany
- State: Bavaria

Physical characteristics
- Mouth
  - location: Regnitz
  - coordinates: 49.8125°N 10.9698°E
- Length: 55.9 km (34.7 mi)
- Basin size: 297 km^{2} (115 sq mi)

Basin features
- Progression: Regnitz→ Main→ Rhine→ North Sea

Reiche Ebrach (German pronunciation: [ˈʁaɪçə ˈʔeːbʁax]) is a river of Bavaria, Germany. It flows into the Regnitz near Hirschaid.

== See also ==
- List of rivers of Bavaria
