= 91607 =

91607 could refer to:

- Zip code for Valley Village, Los Angeles, a neighborhood of Los Angeles, California, United States
- Postal code for Gebsattel, a municipality in Bavaria, Germany
- 91607 Delaboudiniere, a minor planet
