= Neuses =

Neuses may refer to the following places in Germany:

- Neuses (Ansbach), a part of Ansbach, Bavaria
- Neuses (Coburg), a part of Coburg, Bavaria
- Neuses (Kronach), a part of Kronach, Bavaria
- Neuses (Merkendorf), a part of Merkendorf, Bavaria
