= Georges de Bièvre =

French writer and playwright

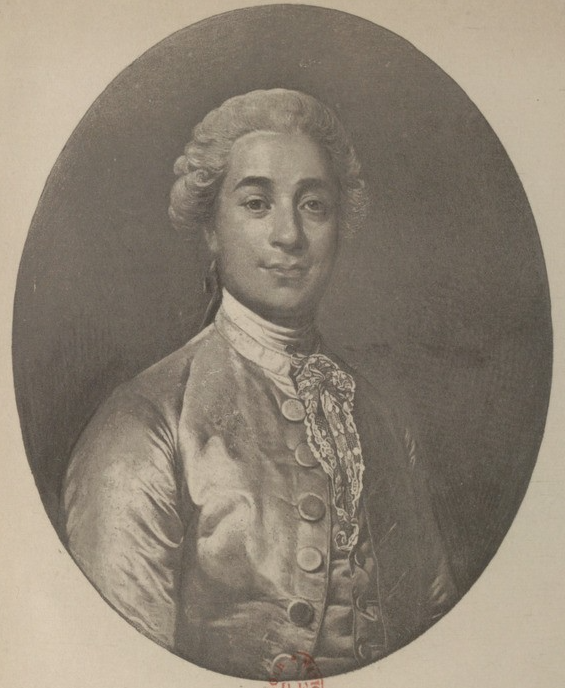
- Born: 16 November 1747; Paris, France
- Died: 24 October 1789 (aged 41); Weidenbach, Bavaria
- Occupations: Writer, playwright

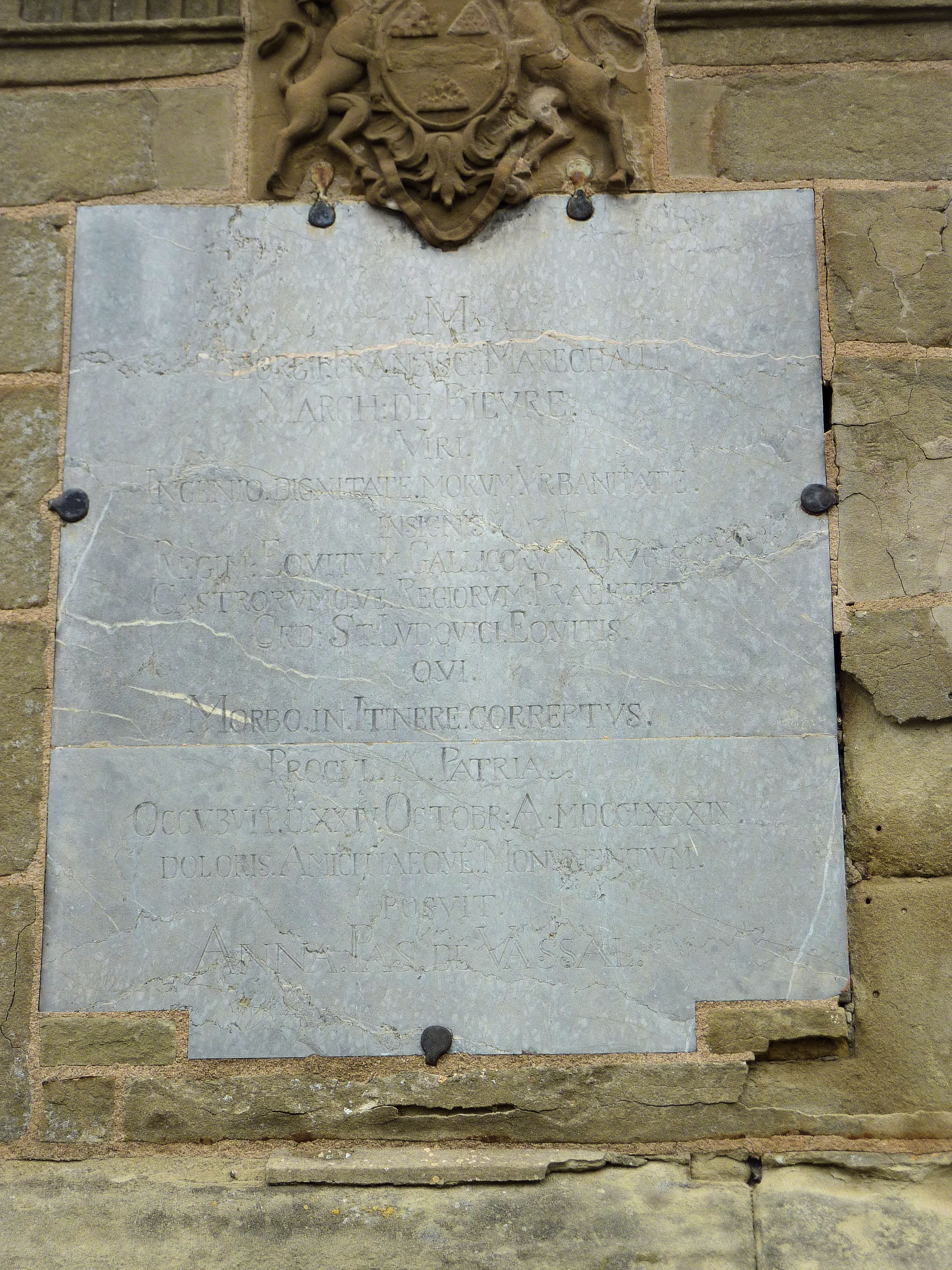
Detail of the plaque

François Georges Mareschal Bièvre Marquis, known as Georges de Bièvre (16 November 1747 – 24 October 1789), was a French writer and playwright.

== Works ==
- Variations comiques sur l’abbé Quille
- Le Séducteur (1783)
- Les Réputations (1787)
- Les Amours de l’ange Lure, 1772 (on ligne).
- Lettre écrite à Madame la comtesse Tation,1770 (on line.
- Vercingentorixe, tragedy in one act and in verses, 1770 (on line).
- Kalembour [sic], Supplément à l'Encyclopédie, 1777 (on line).

== Références ==
- Antoine de Baecque (éd.), Calembours et autres jeux sur les mots d’esprit, Paris, Payot, 2000. Recueil de textes du marquis.
- A. D., Biévriana ou Jeux des mots de M. de Bievre, Paris, Maradan, 8 (i. e. 1800), 1814 (3e éd.).
- Gabriel de Mareschal de Bièvre, Le Marquis de Bièvre, sa vie, ses calembours, ses comédies, 1747-1789, Paris, Plon-Nourrit, 1910
- Melançon, Benoît, « Oralité, brièveté, spontanéité et marginalité : le cas du marquis de Bièvre », in les Marges des Lumières françaises (1750-1789). Actes du colloque organisé par le groupe de recherches Histoire des représentations (EA 2115). 6–7 December 2001 (Université de Tours), sous la direction de Didier Masseau, Genève, Droz, coll. «Bibliothèque des Lumières», LXIV, 2004, (p. 215-224).
