= Wolframs-Eschenbach =

- Town
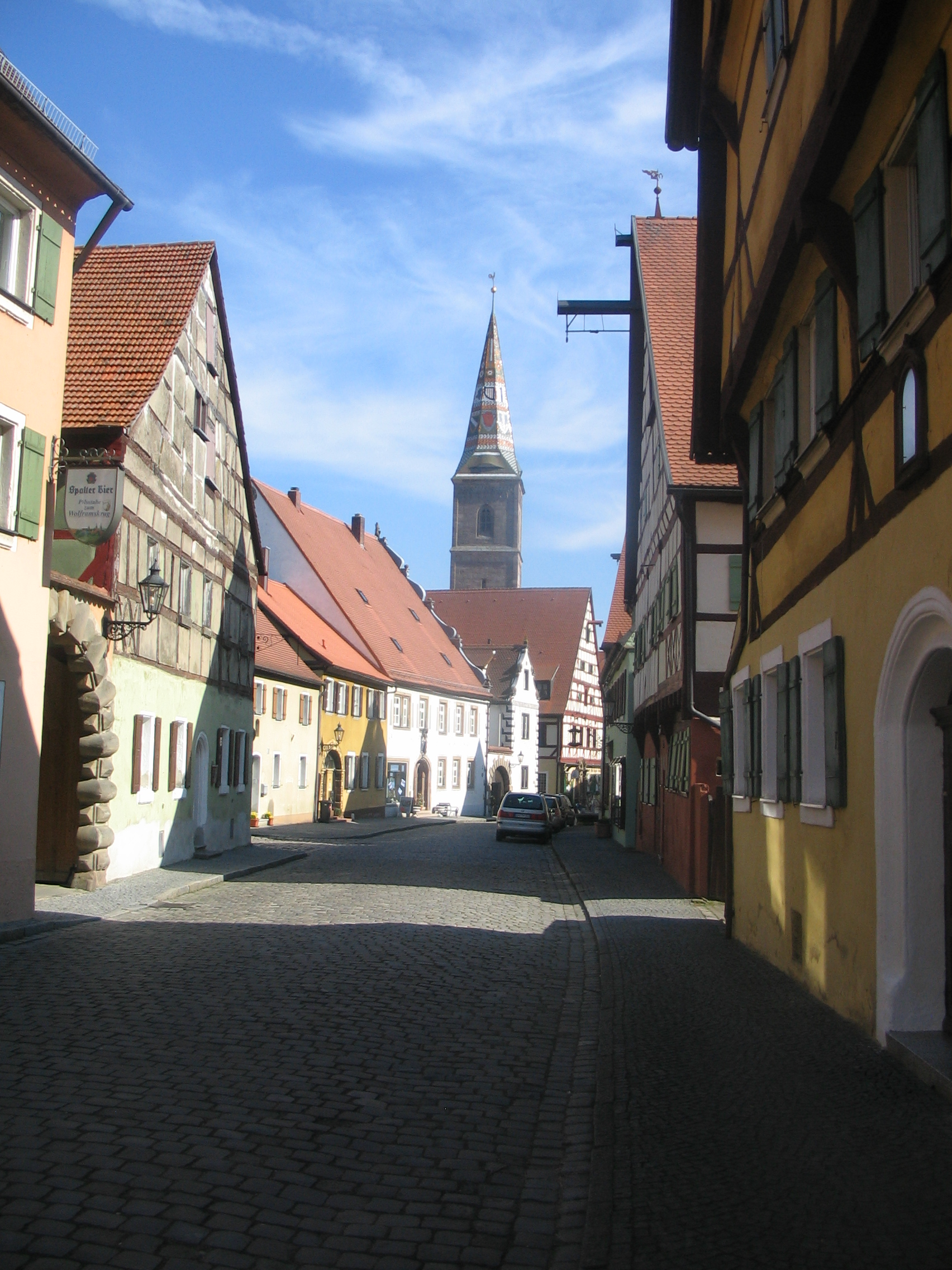

- Coat of arms

- Location of Wolframs-Eschenbach within Ansbach district
- Interactive map of Wolframs-Eschenbach
- Location within Germany Location within Bavaria
- Coordinates: 49°13′35″N 10°43′31″E
- Country: Germany
- State: Bavaria
- Admin. region: Mittelfranken
- District: Ansbach
- Municipal assoc.: Wolframs-Eschenbach
- Subdivisions: 10 Ortsteile

Government
  - Mayor (2020–26): Michael Dörr (CSU)

Area
  - Total: 25.47 km^{2} (9.83 sq mi)
- Elevation: 442 m (1,450 ft)

Population (2025-12-31)
  - Total: 3,304
  - Density: 129.7/km^{2} (336.0/sq mi)
- Time zone: UTC+01:00 (CET)
  - Summer (DST): UTC+02:00 (CEST)
- Postal codes: 91639
- Dialling codes: 09875
- Vehicle registration: AN
- Website: www.wolframs-eschenbach.de

Wolframs-Eschenbach (German pronunciation: [ˈvɔlfʁams ˈɛʃn̩bax]) is a town in the district of Ansbach, in Bavaria, Germany. It is situated 14 km southeast of Ansbach, and 36 km southwest of Nuremberg.

Wolframs-Eschenbach, formerly named "Eschenbach" and "Ober-Eschenbach", is a small town, founded in the Middle Ages, which still today preserves architecture about 500 years old.

The town claims that the medieval knight and poet Wolfram von Eschenbach is from it. In 1917, the town was named after him, though it is not certain that this is the exact "Eschenbach" which Wolfram came from. A notable church is the Liebfrauenmünster (Minster of our Dear Lady).

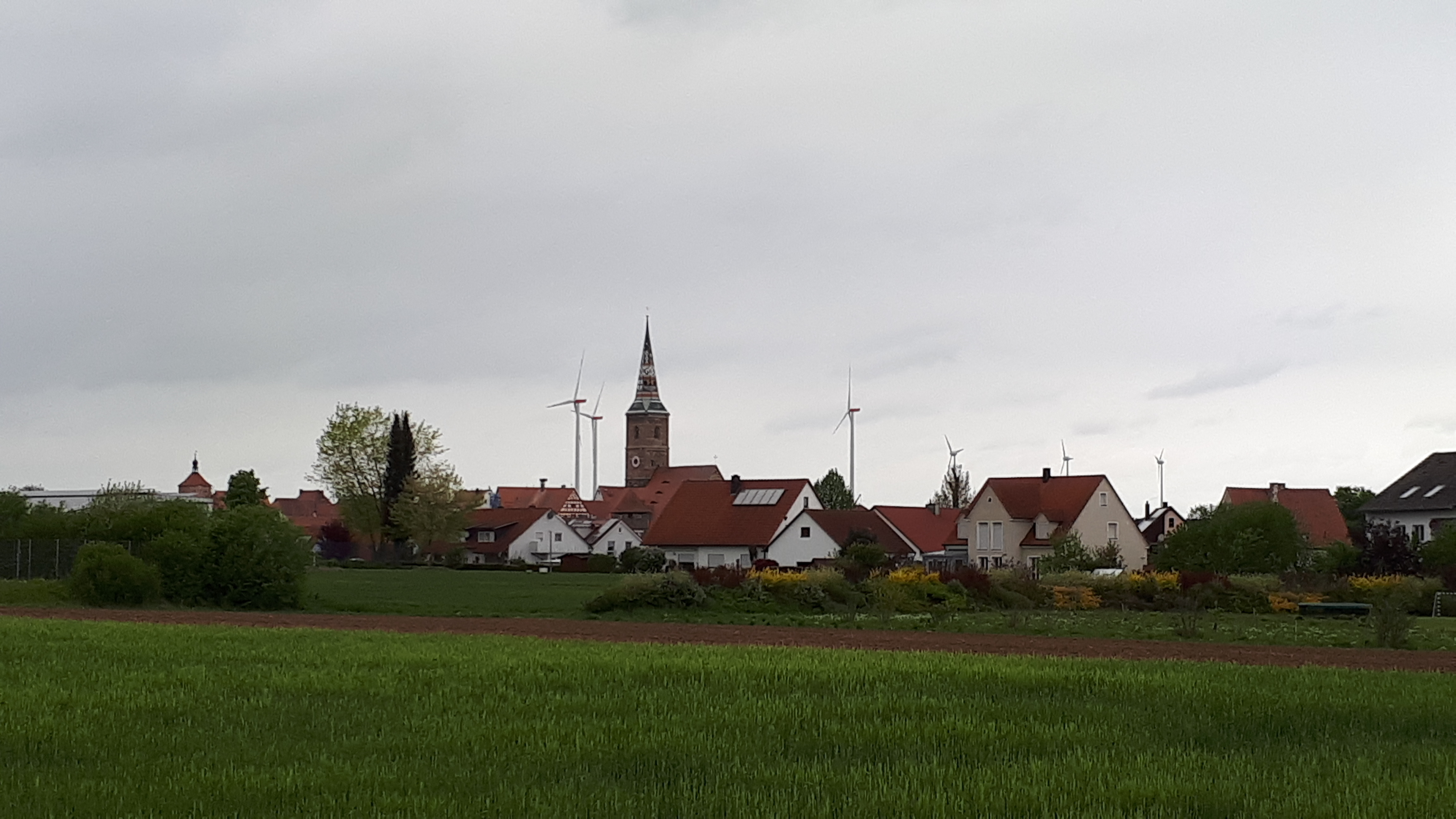
Wolframs-Eschenbach from South-East

== History ==
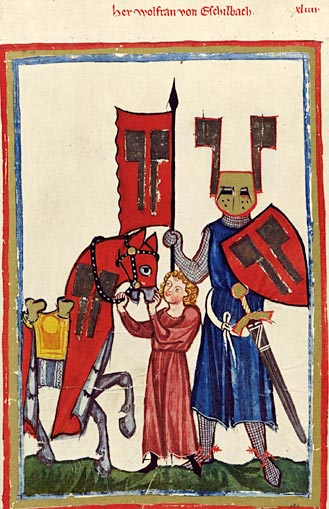
Wolfram von Eschenbach, Author's image as a knight in the Codex Manesse

=== Until the 19th century ===
The place was first documented as "Eschelebach" in the period between 1057 and 1075. The place name is derived from the water body of the same name, whose defining word is ash ("Esche" in German). In 1309, the form "Obern-Eschembach" was attested to distinguish it from nearby places of the same name (Mitteleschenbach, Untereschenbach).

In the 11th century, Eschenbach belonged to the bishops of Eichstätt, and towards the end of the 12th century, various counts became the lords of Eschenbach or Obereschenbach. Around 1212/1220, Obereschenbach (since 1917 Wolframs-Eschenbach) was given as a gift to the Teutonic Order by the Counts of Wertheim. From this point on, the Teutonic Order played a significant role in the history of Eschenbach. It ruled the town for over 600 years. Eschenbach was located on an important trade route and eventually became a regional trading center as well as a secular and spiritual center. Emperor Ludwig the Bavarian granted the town town charter on December 18, 1332.

According to the Urbarium of the Teutonic Order Commandery of Nuremberg from 1343, the Eschenbach city bailiwick owned 5 farms, 1 fief, 1 small estate, 73 farmsteads, 2 houses, the barber, 5 farmyards, more than 66 acres of fields, meadows and gardens.

From 1500 to 1806, the town belonged to the Franconian Imperial Circle, as the Bailiwick of Franconia was incorporated into this Imperial Circle. Although the Teutonic Order was not abolished until 1809 by decree of Napoleon I, Bavaria had already confiscated the Ellingen Commandery and the (Wolframs-)Eschenbach district in 1806 as part of the abolition of knightly estates.

Towards the end of the 18th century, there were 171 properties in Eschenbach. The high court, as well as the village and community authority and the manorial authority over the properties, were exercised by the Eschenbach Town Vogtei Office of the Teutonic Order. There were also stately, municipal, and ecclesiastical buildings. From 1797 to 1808, the town was under the jurisdiction of the Windsbach Justice and Chamber Office. At that time, there were 160 houses.

In 1806, Eschenbach became part of the Kingdom of Bavaria. As part of the municipal edict, the Eschenbach tax district was established in 1808. The municipal municipality of Eschenbach was founded in 1810 and was congruent with the Eschenbach tax district. Its administration and jurisdiction were assigned to the Heilsbronn Regional Court, and its financial administration to the Windsbach Revenue Office. From 1862 to 1879, Eschenbach belonged to the Heilsbronn District Office, and from 1880 to the Gunzenhausen District Office (renamed Gunzenhausen District in 1939) and the Gunzenhausen Revenue Office (renamed Gunzenhausen Tax Office in 1919). Jurisdiction remained with the Heilsbronn Regional Court until 1879, and from 1880 to 1973, the Gunzenhausen District Court was responsible. Since 1972, Wolframs-Eschenbach has belonged to the Ansbach district, and one year later it was assigned to the Ansbach District Court and the Ansbach Tax Office. In 1964, the municipality had a total area of 6,490 km².

=== Since the 20th century ===
On 19 July 1917, at the instigation of Prelate Johann Baptist Kurz (1881 – 1968), the city was renamed Wolframs-Eschenbach by a decree of King Ludwig III of Bavaria of (Upper) Eschenbach in honor of Wolfram von Eschenbach from the Gentile family of Eschenbach.

Displaced people from Silesia, Bohemia and Moravia moved to Wolframs-Eschenbach from 1945 and let the place grow.

As part of the administrative reform in Bavaria, the municipality of Reutern was incorporated on 1 January 1972. On 1 July 1972, Waizendorf was added from the dissolved municipality of Gerbersdorf. Biederbach and Selgenstadt followed on 1 May 1978.

Since 2007, Wolframs-Eschenbach has been a state-approved resort.

== Notable people ==
- Wolfram von Eschenbach (1170 – c. 1220) is one of the most famous medieval poets and minstrels. His most famous work is Parzival.
- Friedrich Dörr (1908–1993) was a German Catholic priest, professor of theology and hymnwriter, who shaped the Gotteslob hymnal.
- Eric Weeger (born 1997) is a German professional footballer and was born in Wolframs-Eschenbach
