= Windelsbach =

- Municipality
- Coat of arms

- Location of Windelsbach within Ansbach district
- Interactive map of Windelsbach
- Location within Germany Location within Bavaria
- Coordinates: 49°23′N 10°18′E
- Country: Germany
- State: Bavaria
- Admin. region: Mittelfranken
- District: Ansbach
- Municipal assoc.: Rothenburg ob der Tauber
- Subdivisions: 9 Ortsteile

Government
  - Mayor (2020–26): Werner Schuster

Area
  - Total: 38.48 km^{2} (14.86 sq mi)
- Elevation: 450 m (1,480 ft)

Population (2025-12-31)
  - Total: 1,085
  - Density: 28.20/km^{2} (73.03/sq mi)
- Time zone: UTC+01:00 (CET)
  - Summer (DST): UTC+02:00 (CEST)
- Postal codes: 91635
- Dialling codes: 09867
- Vehicle registration: AN
- Website: www.windelsbach.de

Windelsbach (German pronunciation: [ˈvɪndl̩sˌbax]) is a municipality in the district of Ansbach in Bavaria in Germany.
