= Steinsfeld =

- Municipality
- Coat of arms

- Location of Steinsfeld within Ansbach district
- Interactive map of Steinsfeld
- Location within Germany Location within Bavaria
- Coordinates: 49°25′N 10°13′E
- Country: Germany
- State: Bavaria
- Admin. region: Mittelfranken
- District: Ansbach
- Municipal assoc.: Rothenburg ob der Tauber
- Subdivisions: 10 Ortsteile

Government
  - Mayor (2020–26): Margarita Kerschbaum

Area
  - Total: 31.8 km^{2} (12.3 sq mi)
- Elevation: 405 m (1,329 ft)

Population (2025-12-31)
  - Total: 1,218
  - Density: 38.3/km^{2} (99.2/sq mi)
- Time zone: UTC+01:00 (CET)
  - Summer (DST): UTC+02:00 (CEST)
- Postal codes: 91628
- Dialling codes: 09861
- Vehicle registration: AN
- Website: www.steinsfeld.de

Steinsfeld (German pronunciation: [ˈʃtaɪnsfɛlt]) is a municipality in the district of Ansbach in Bavaria in Germany.
