= Geslau =

- Municipality
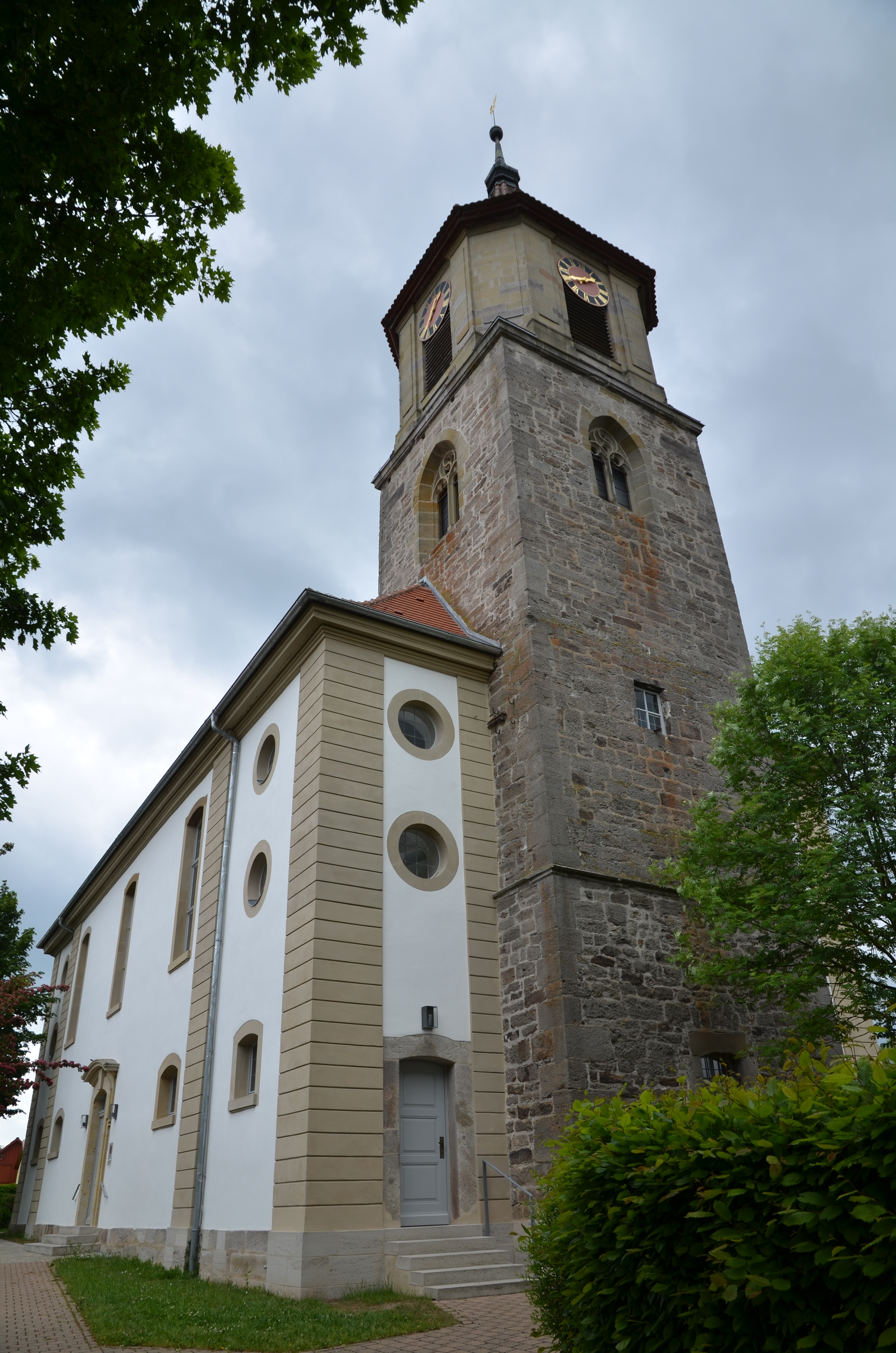
- Lutheran Church of Saint Kilian

- Coat of arms

- Location of Geslau within Ansbach district
- Interactive map of Geslau
- Location within Germany Location within Bavaria
- Coordinates: 49°22′0″N 10°18′53″E
- Country: Germany
- State: Bavaria
- Admin. region: Mittelfranken
- District: Ansbach
- Municipal assoc.: Rothenburg ob der Tauber
- Subdivisions: 14 Ortsteile

Government
  - Mayor (2020–26): Richard Strauß

Area
  - Total: 41.97 km^{2} (16.20 sq mi)
- Elevation: 435 m (1,427 ft)

Population (2025-12-31)
  - Total: 1,384
  - Density: 32.98/km^{2} (85.41/sq mi)
- Time zone: UTC+01:00 (CET)
  - Summer (DST): UTC+02:00 (CEST)
- Postal codes: 91608
- Dialling codes: 09867
- Vehicle registration: AN
- Website: www.geslau.de

Geslau is a municipality in the district of Ansbach in Bavaria in Germany.
