= Liebfrauenmünster, Wolframs-Eschenbach =

Church in Wolframs-Eschenbach, Bavaria, Germany

Coordinates: 49°13′37″N 10°43′35″E

Liebfrauenmünster
- Liebfrauenmünster, Wolframs-Eschenbach
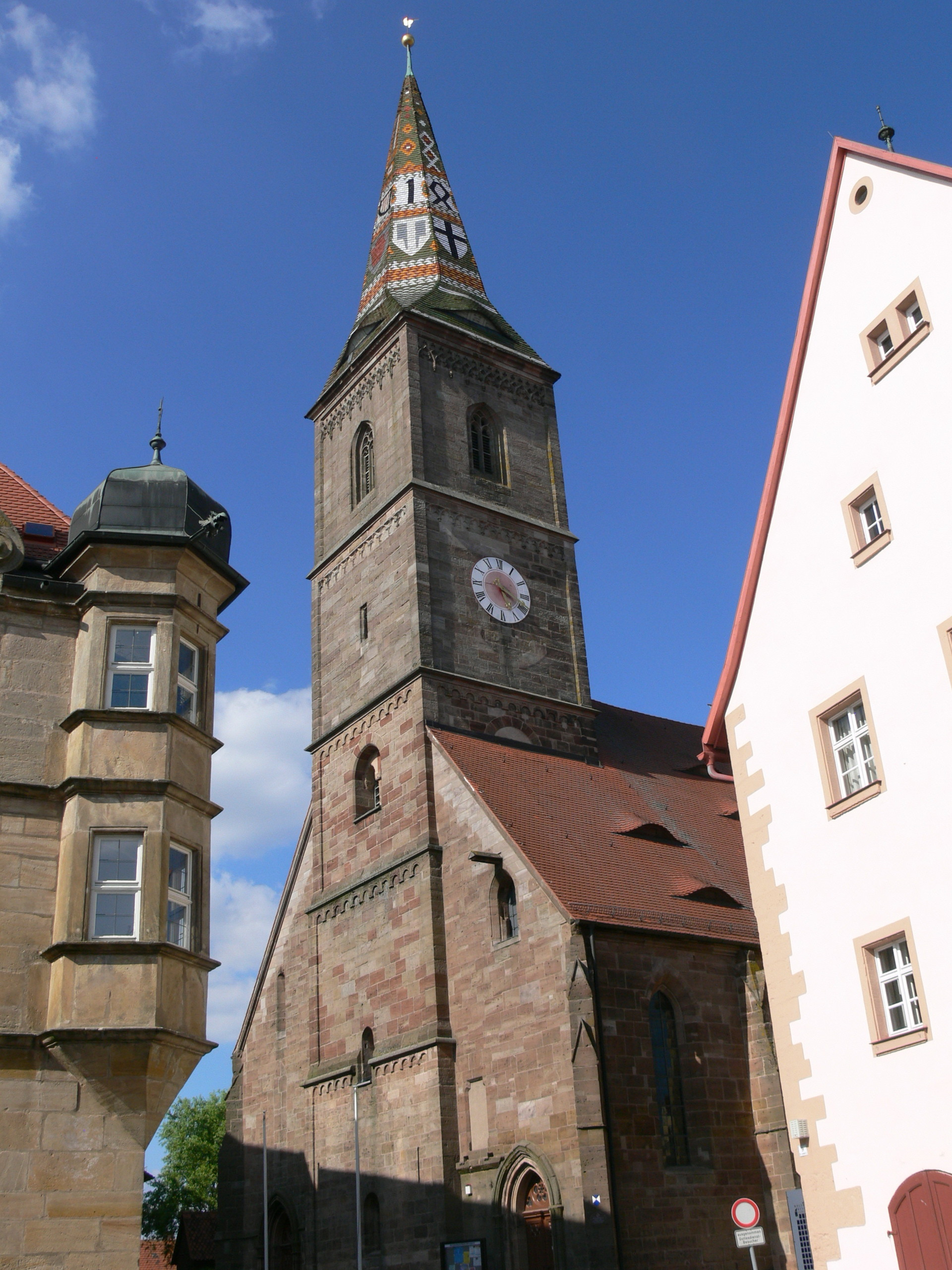
- Liebfrauenmünster
- Address: Wolframs-Eschenbach, Bavaria, Germany
- Country: Germany
- Denomination: Catholic

History
- Founded: 1310

Architecture
- Style: Gothic
- Years built: 1310

Liebfrauenmünster in Wolframs-Eschenbach is a church in Wolframs-Eschenbach, Bavaria, Germany. It was built in 1310. The altar of the Rosary in the church was made in 1510 probably by disciples of Veit Stoß.
