= Rothenburg ob der Tauber (Verwaltungsgemeinschaft) =

- Verwaltungsgemeinschaft
- Location of Rothenburg ob der Tauber within Ansbach district
- Interactive map of Rothenburg ob der Tauber
- Location within Germany Location within Bavaria
- Coordinates: 49°23′N 10°11′E
- Country: Germany
- State: Bavaria
- Admin. region: Middle Franconia
- District: Ansbach
- Seat: Rothenburg ob der Tauber
- Subdivisions: 8 municipalities

Area
  - Total: 216.37 km^{2} (83.54 sq mi)

Population (2025-12-31)
  - Total: 10,010
  - Density: 46.26/km^{2} (119.8/sq mi)
- Time zone: UTC+01:00 (CET)
  - Summer (DST): UTC+02:00 (CEST)
- Website: www.vg-rothenburg.de

Rothenburg ob der Tauber is a Verwaltungsgemeinschaft (municipal association) in the district of Ansbach in Bavaria, Germany. Its seat is in Rothenburg ob der Tauber, itself not part of the Verwaltungsgemeinschaft.

It consists of the following municipalities:

1. Adelshofen
2. Gebsattel
3. Geslau
4. Insingen
5. Neusitz
6. Ohrenbach
7. Steinsfeld
8. Windelsbach
