= Bruckberg, Middle Franconia =

Bruckberg
- Municipality
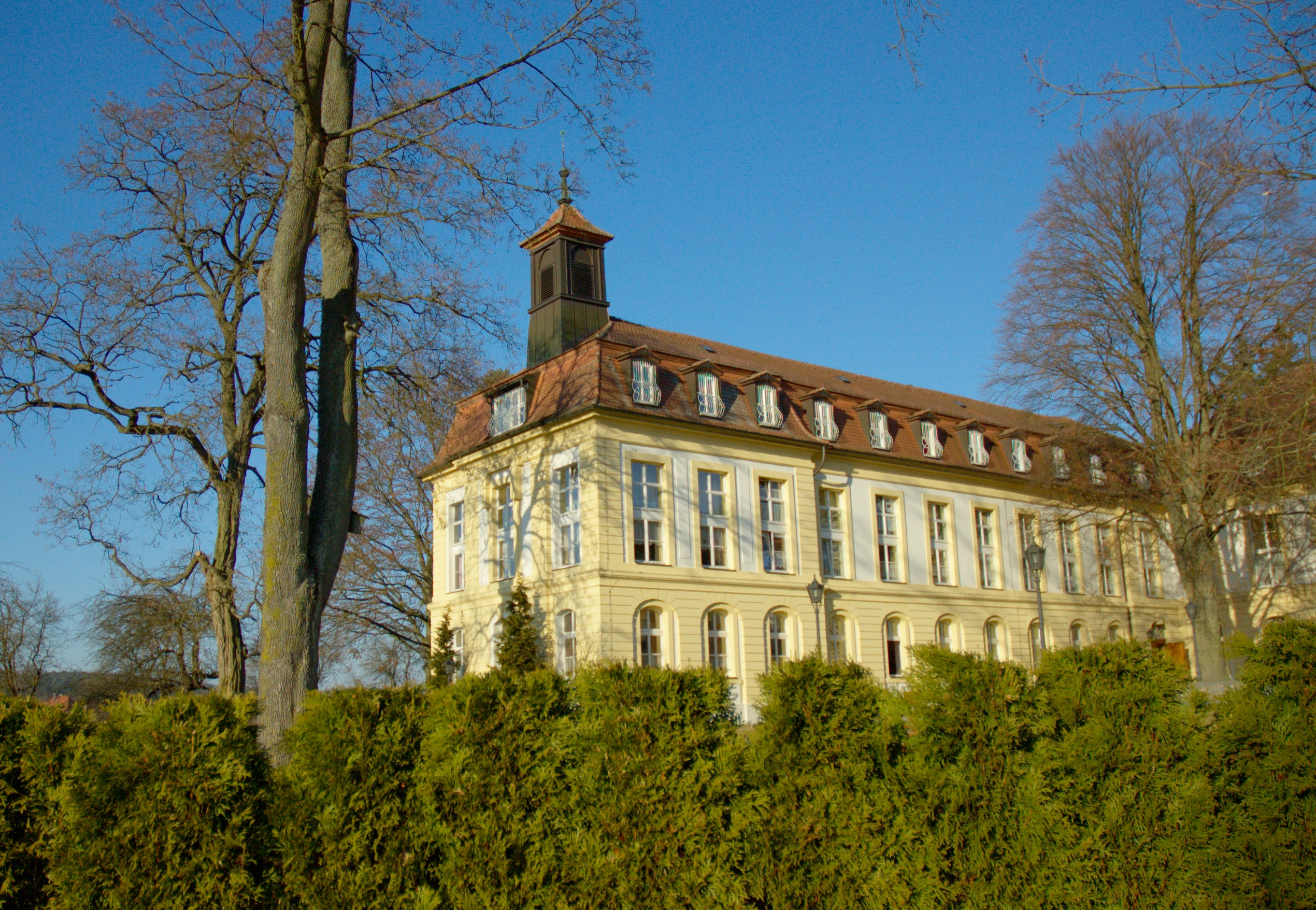
- Bruckberg Palace

- Flag Coat of arms

- Location of Bruckberg within Ansbach district
- Interactive map of Bruckberg
- Location within Germany Location within Bavaria
- Coordinates: 49°21′N 10°41′E
- Country: Germany
- State: Bavaria
- Admin. region: Mittelfranken
- District: Ansbach
- Municipal assoc.: Weihenzell
- Subdivisions: 4 Ortsteile

Government
  - Mayor (2020–26): Ursula Weiß

Area
  - Total: 7.61 km^{2} (2.94 sq mi)
- Elevation: 347 m (1,138 ft)

Population (2025-12-31)
  - Total: 1,236
  - Density: 162/km^{2} (421/sq mi)
- Time zone: UTC+01:00 (CET)
  - Summer (DST): UTC+02:00 (CEST)
- Postal codes: 91590
- Dialling codes: 09824
- Vehicle registration: AN
- Website: www.bruckberg.de

Bruckberg (German pronunciation: [ˈbʁʊkbɛʁk]) is a municipality in the district of Ansbach in Bavaria in Germany.
