= Wieseth =

- Municipality
- Coat of arms

- Location of Wieseth within Ansbach district
- Interactive map of Wieseth
- Location within Germany Location within Bavaria
- Coordinates: 49°10′N 10°28′E
- Country: Germany
- State: Bavaria
- Admin. region: Mittelfranken
- District: Ansbach
- Municipal assoc.: Dentlein am Forst

Government
  - Mayor (2020–26): Walter Kollmar

Area
  - Total: 20.59 km^{2} (7.95 sq mi)
- Elevation: 443 m (1,453 ft)

Population (2025-12-31)
  - Total: 1,322
  - Density: 64.21/km^{2} (166.3/sq mi)
- Time zone: UTC+01:00 (CET)
  - Summer (DST): UTC+02:00 (CEST)
- Postal codes: 91632
- Dialling codes: 09822
- Vehicle registration: AN

Wieseth (German pronunciation: [ˈviːzɛt]) is a municipality in the district of Ansbach in Bavaria in Germany.
