= Burgoberbach =

- Municipality
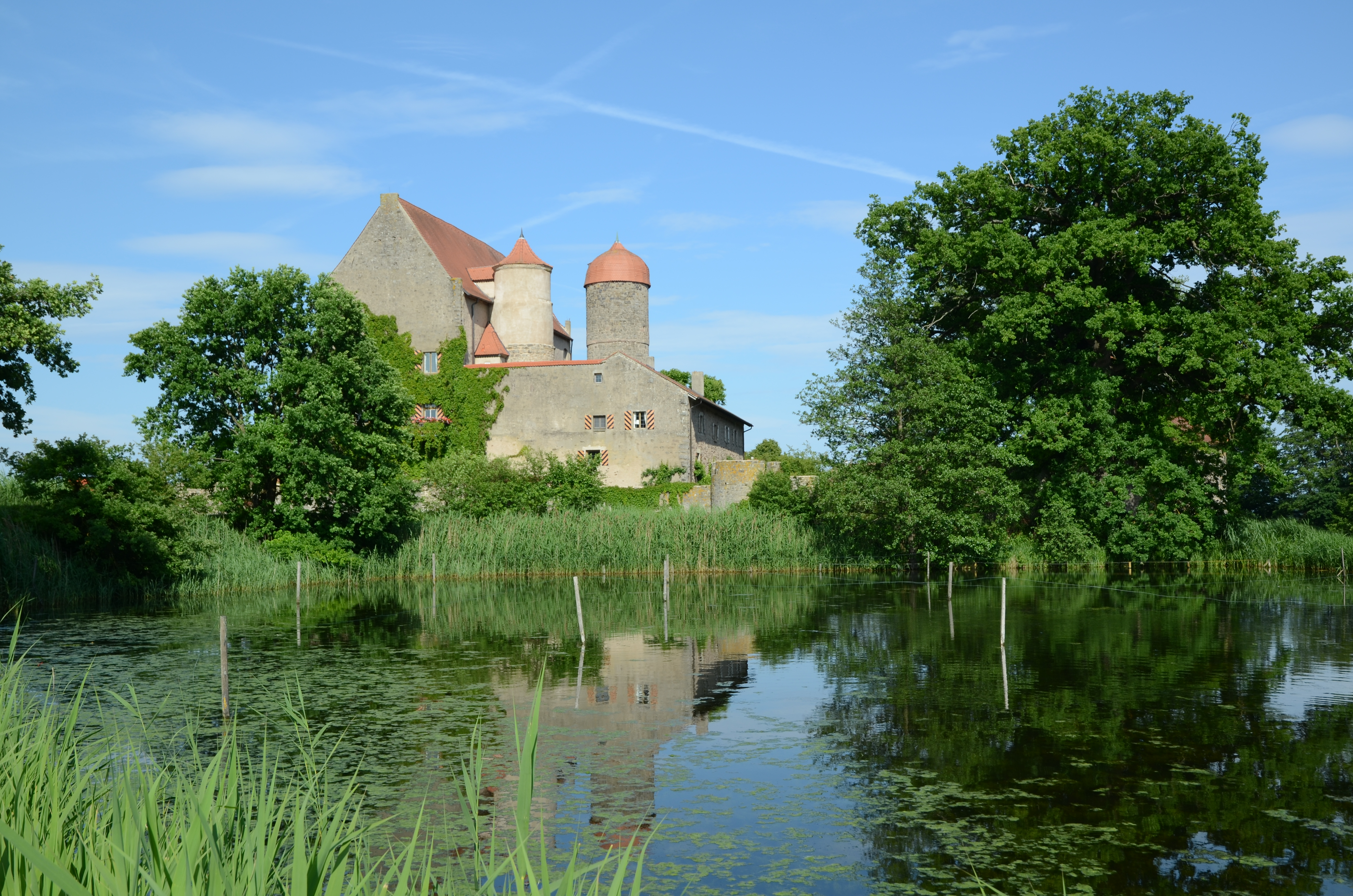
- Sommersdorf Castle

- Coat of arms

- Location of Burgoberbach within Ansbach district
- Interactive map of Burgoberbach
- Location within Germany Location within Bavaria
- Coordinates: 49°13′N 10°34′E
- Country: Germany
- State: Bavaria
- Admin. region: Mittelfranken
- District: Ansbach
- Subdivisions: 7 Ortsteile

Government
  - Mayor (2020–26): Gerhard Rammler (CSU)

Area
  - Total: 12.61 km^{2} (4.87 sq mi)
- Elevation: 470 m (1,540 ft)

Population (2025-12-31)
  - Total: 3,795
  - Density: 301.0/km^{2} (779.5/sq mi)
- Time zone: UTC+01:00 (CET)
  - Summer (DST): UTC+02:00 (CEST)
- Postal codes: 91595
- Dialling codes: 09805
- Vehicle registration: AN
- Website: www.burgoberbach.de

Burgoberbach (German pronunciation: [bʊʁkˈʔoːbɐbax]) is a municipality in the district of Ansbach in Bavaria in Germany.

In the graveyard of the Catholic church of St. Leonhard lies the grave of Flying Officer George Warren, administered by the Commonwealth War Graves Commission.
