= Rügland =

- Municipality
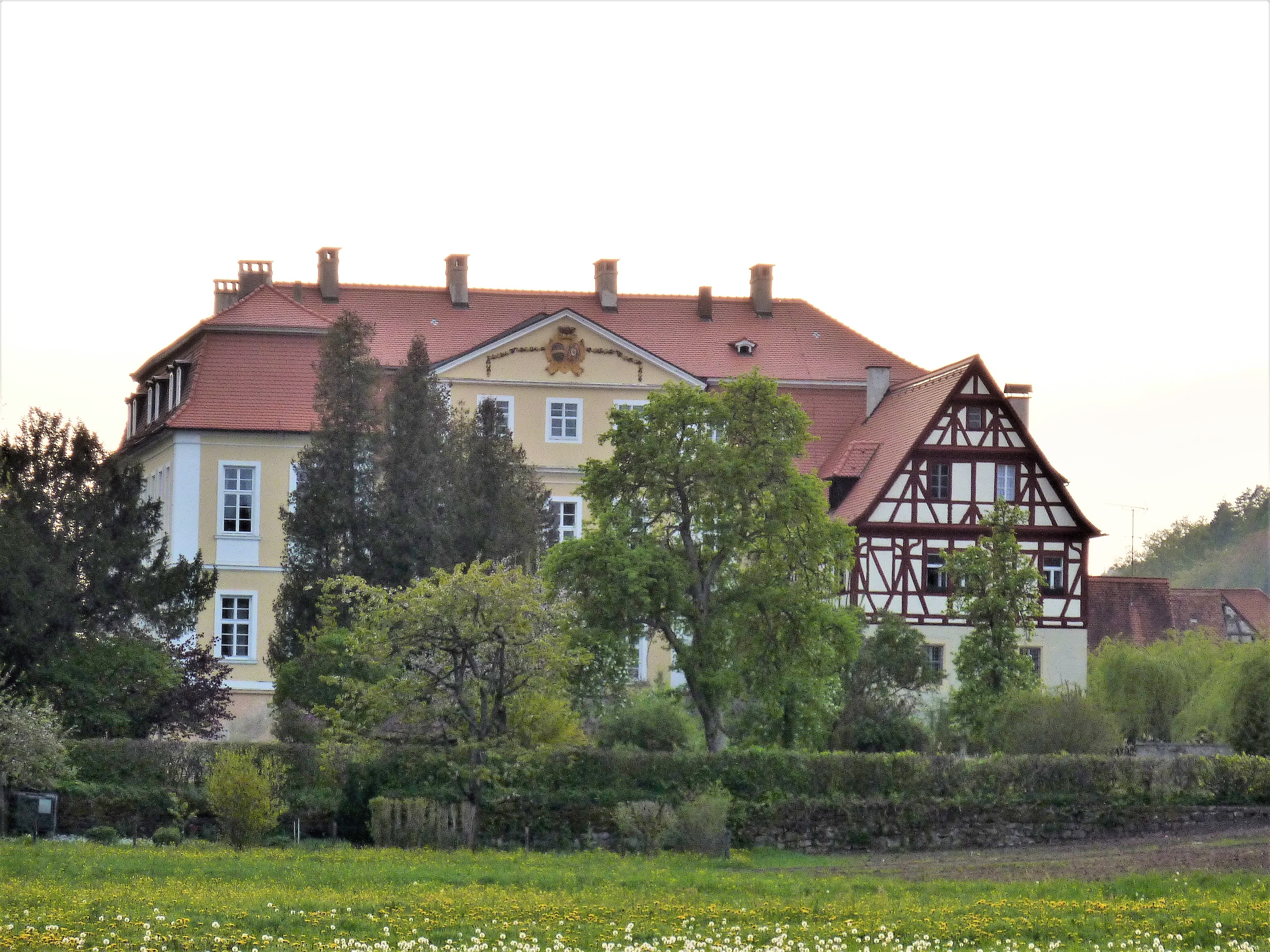
- Rügland Castle

- Coat of arms

- Location of Rügland within Ansbach district
- Interactive map of Rügland
- Location within Germany Location within Bavaria
- Coordinates: 49°23′N 10°34′E
- Country: Germany
- State: Bavaria
- Admin. region: Mittelfranken
- District: Ansbach
- Municipal assoc.: Weihenzell
- Subdivisions: 9 Ortsteile

Government
  - Mayor (2020–26): Wolfgang Schicktanz

Area
  - Total: 20.89 km^{2} (8.07 sq mi)
- Elevation: 388 m (1,273 ft)

Population (2025-12-31)
  - Total: 1,256
  - Density: 60.12/km^{2} (155.7/sq mi)
- Time zone: UTC+01:00 (CET)
  - Summer (DST): UTC+02:00 (CEST)
- Postal codes: 91622
- Dialling codes: 09828
- Vehicle registration: AN
- Website: www.ruegland.de

Rügland is a municipality in the district of Ansbach in Bavaria in Germany.

== Culture and Sights ==
=== Rügland Castle ===
Rügland Castle is one of the few moated castles in Middle Franconia. The north wing dates from the 17th century; the rest was then built according to the plans of Carl Friedrich von Zocha. Today, the castle houses a museum dedicated to the lords of nearby Crailsheim. The castle grounds are decorated with sandstone statues of mythological figures.

=== Carl Osman ===
At the Siege of Belgrade during the “Turkish Crusade” of 1688, two Turks were captured. One of these men — Mustapha, born in 1655 Constantinople — saved the life of Hannibal von Crailshem during a battle, and by doing so, one the lord’s favor. He was sent back to Germany, and worked for the family. In 1727, he was christened in the church in Rügland and took the name Carl Osman. In 1734, he donated two silver chandeliers to the church, which can still be seen today.

In his will, he stipulated that every person that attended his funeral should receive five Kreuzer. When he died in 1735, 925 people showed up to attend. His headstone bears the inscription:

„Hier ruhet in Gott Carl Osman, ward geboren zu Constantinopel 1655, vor Belgrad gefangen 1688, zu Rügland getauft 1727, in Diensten gestanden 47 Jahr. Er starb 1735, alt 80 Jahr.“
“Here rests Carl Osman, who was born in Constantinople 1655, captured in Belgrade 1688, christened in Rügland 1727, served 47 years. He died 1735, aged 80 years”
