= Triesdorf =

- Verwaltungsgemeinschaft
- Location of Triesdorf within Ansbach district
- Interactive map of Triesdorf
- Location within Germany Location within Bavaria
- Coordinates: 49°12′N 10°39′E
- Country: Germany
- State: Bavaria
- Admin. region: Middle Franconia
- District: Ansbach
- Seat: Weidenbach
- Subdivisions: 2 municipalities

Area
  - Total: 36.87 km^{2} (14.24 sq mi)

Population (2025-12-31)
  - Total: 4,237
  - Density: 114.9/km^{2} (297.6/sq mi)
- Time zone: UTC+01:00 (CET)
  - Summer (DST): UTC+02:00 (CEST)

Triesdorf is a Verwaltungsgemeinschaft (municipal association) in the district of Ansbach in Bavaria, Germany. Its seat is in Weidenbach. It takes its name from the village Triesdorf, part of the municipality Weidenbach.

It consists of the following municipalities:

1. Ornbau
2. Weidenbach
