= Langfurth =

- Municipality
- Coat of arms

- Location of Langfurth within Ansbach district
- Interactive map of Langfurth
- Location within Germany Location within Bavaria
- Coordinates: 49°6′N 10°26′E
- Country: Germany
- State: Bavaria
- Admin. region: Mittelfranken
- District: Ansbach
- Subdivisions: 9 Ortsteile

Government
  - Mayor (2020–26): Simon Schäffler

Area
  - Total: 21.15 km^{2} (8.17 sq mi)
- Elevation: 443 m (1,453 ft)

Population (2025-12-31)
  - Total: 2,039
  - Density: 96.41/km^{2} (249.7/sq mi)
- Time zone: UTC+01:00 (CET)
  - Summer (DST): UTC+02:00 (CEST)
- Postal codes: 91731
- Dialling codes: 09856
- Vehicle registration: AN
- Website: www.langfurth.de

Langfurth (German pronunciation: [ˈlaŋfʊʁt]) is a municipality in the district of Ansbach in Bavaria in Germany.
