= Insingen =

- Municipality
- Coat of arms

- Location of Insingen within Ansbach district
- Interactive map of Insingen
- Location within Germany Location within Bavaria
- Coordinates: 49°17′N 10°10′E
- Country: Germany
- State: Bavaria
- Admin. region: Mittelfranken
- District: Ansbach
- Municipal assoc.: Rothenburg ob der Tauber
- Subdivisions: 9 Ortsteile

Government
  - Mayor (2020–26): Peter Köhnlechner

Area
  - Total: 21.32 km^{2} (8.23 sq mi)
- Elevation: 399 m (1,309 ft)

Population (2025-12-31)
  - Total: 1,204
  - Density: 56.47/km^{2} (146.3/sq mi)
- Time zone: UTC+01:00 (CET)
  - Summer (DST): UTC+02:00 (CEST)
- Postal codes: 91610
- Dialling codes: 09869
- Vehicle registration: AN
- Website: www.insingen.de

Insingen (German pronunciation: [ˈɪnzɪŋən]) is a municipality in the district of Ansbach in Bavaria in Germany.
