= Weihenzell =

- Municipality
- Coat of arms

- Location of Weihenzell within Ansbach district
- Interactive map of Weihenzell
- Location within Germany Location within Bavaria
- Coordinates: 49°21′N 10°37′E
- Country: Germany
- State: Bavaria
- Admin. region: Mittelfranken
- District: Ansbach
- Municipal assoc.: Weihenzell
- Subdivisions: 22 Ortsteile

Government
  - Mayor (2020–26): Gerhard Kraft

Area
  - Total: 45.22 km^{2} (17.46 sq mi)
- Elevation: 387 m (1,270 ft)

Population (2025-12-31)
  - Total: 2,985
  - Density: 66.01/km^{2} (171.0/sq mi)
- Time zone: UTC+01:00 (CET)
  - Summer (DST): UTC+02:00 (CEST)
- Postal codes: 91629
- Dialling codes: 09802
- Vehicle registration: AN
- Website: www.weihenzell.de

Weihenzell (German pronunciation: [ˈvaɪənˌtsɛl]; East Franconian: Waia-zell) is a municipality in the district of Ansbach in Bavaria in Germany.
