= Lehrberg =

- Municipality
- Coat of arms

- Location of Lehrberg within Ansbach district
- Interactive map of Lehrberg
- Location within Germany Location within Bavaria
- Coordinates: 49°19′N 10°31′E
- Country: Germany
- State: Bavaria
- Admin. region: Mittelfranken
- District: Ansbach
- Subdivisions: 19 Ortsteile

Government
  - Mayor (2020–26): Renate Hans

Area
  - Total: 50.85 km^{2} (19.63 sq mi)
- Elevation: 407 m (1,335 ft)

Population (2025-12-31)
  - Total: 3,146
  - Density: 61.87/km^{2} (160.2/sq mi)
- Time zone: UTC+01:00 (CET)
  - Summer (DST): UTC+02:00 (CEST)
- Postal codes: 91611
- Dialling codes: 09820
- Vehicle registration: AN
- Website: www.lehrberg.de

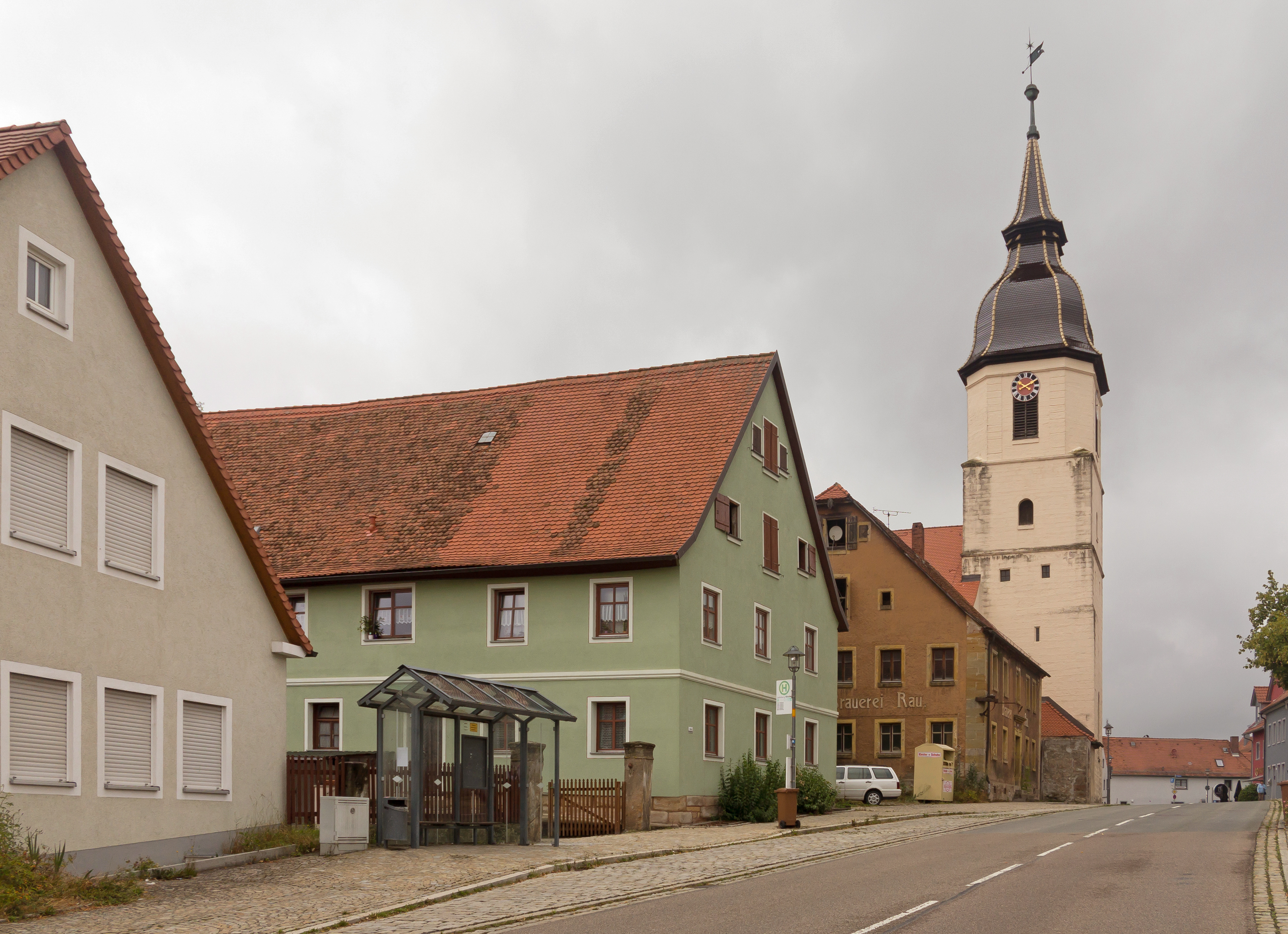
Lehrberg, reformed church (Pfarrkirche Sankt Margaretha) in the street

Lehrberg (German pronunciation: [ˈleːɐ̯bɛʁk]; East Franconian: Lährberch) is a market town in the district of Ansbach, Mittelfranken, Bavaria, Germany.

== Villages ==
There are districts mentioned below:

- Ballstadt
- Berndorf
- Birkach
- Brünst
- Buhlsbach
- Gödersklingen
- Gräfenbuch
- Hürbel am Rangen
- Kühndorf
- Lehrberg
- Oberheßbach
- Obersulzbach
- Röshof
- Schmalach
- Schmalenbach
- Unterheßbach
- Untersulzbach
- Wüstendorf
- Zailach
