= Wilburgstetten =

- Municipality
- Coat of arms

- Location of Wilburgstetten within Ansbach district
- Interactive map of Wilburgstetten
- Location within Germany Location within Bavaria
- Coordinates: 49°1′41″N 10°23′31″E
- Country: Germany
- State: Bavaria
- Admin. region: Mittelfranken
- District: Ansbach
- Municipal assoc.: Wilburgstetten
- Subdivisions: 6 Ortsteile

Government
  - Mayor (2020–26): Michael Sommer (CSU)

Area
  - Total: 25.30 km^{2} (9.77 sq mi)
- Elevation: 437 m (1,434 ft)

Population (2025-12-31)
  - Total: 1,992
  - Density: 78.74/km^{2} (203.9/sq mi)
- Time zone: UTC+01:00 (CET)
  - Summer (DST): UTC+02:00 (CEST)
- Postal codes: 91634
- Dialling codes: 09853
- Vehicle registration: AN
- Website: www.wilburgstetten.de

Wilburgstetten is a municipality in the district of Ansbach in Bavaria in Germany.

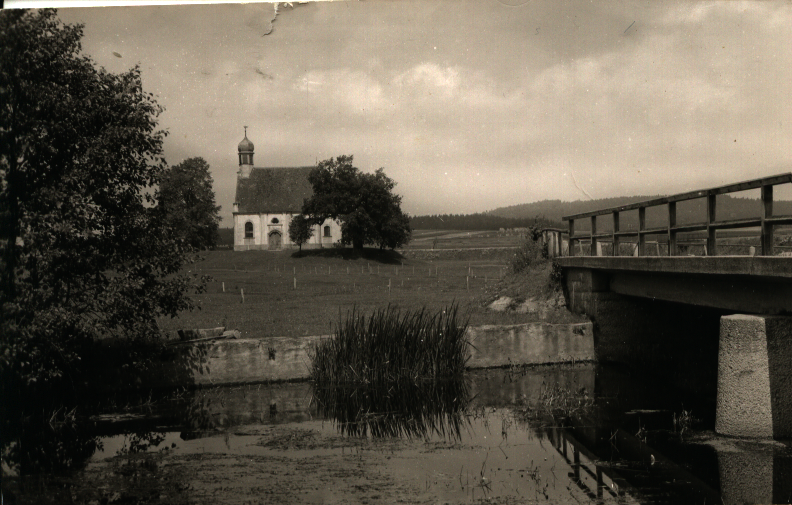
Panorama of Wilburgstetten
