= Flachslanden =

- Municipality
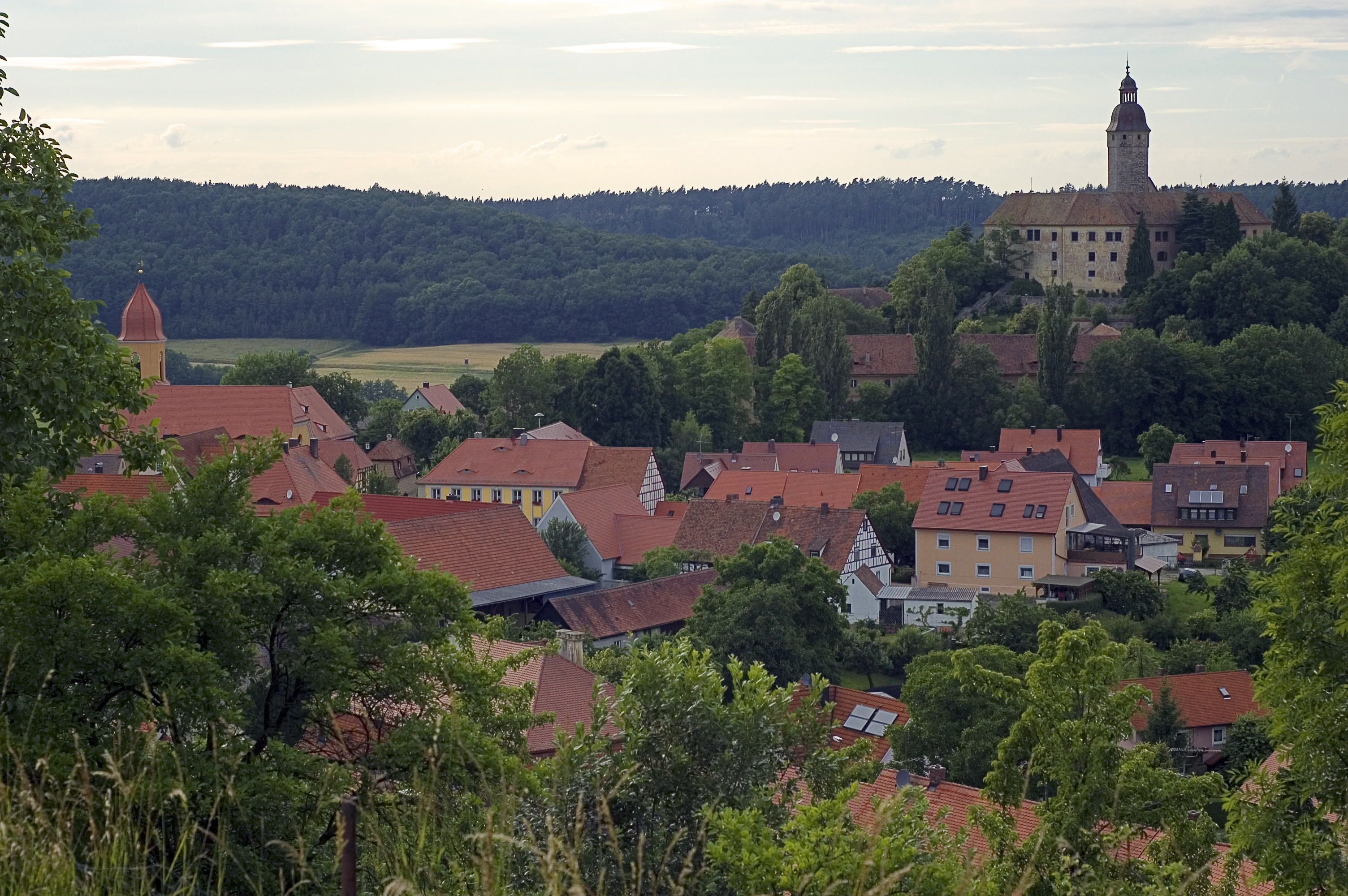
- Virnsberg Castle in Virnsberg, Flachslanden

- Coat of arms

- Location of Flachslanden within Ansbach district
- Interactive map of Flachslanden
- Location within Germany Location within Bavaria
- Coordinates: 49°23′N 10°31′E
- Country: Germany
- State: Bavaria
- Admin. region: Mittelfranken
- District: Ansbach
- Subdivisions: 15 Ortsteile

Government
  - Mayor (2020–26): Hans Henninger

Area
  - Total: 41.00 km^{2} (15.83 sq mi)
- Elevation: 470 m (1,540 ft)

Population (2025-12-31)
  - Total: 2,472
  - Density: 60.29/km^{2} (156.2/sq mi)
- Time zone: UTC+01:00 (CET)
  - Summer (DST): UTC+02:00 (CEST)
- Postal codes: 91604
- Dialling codes: 09829
- Vehicle registration: AN
- Website: www.flachslanden.de

Flachslanden is a municipality in the district of Ansbach in Bavaria in Germany.
