= Ansbach (district) =

Coordinates: 49°20′N 10°30′E

- District
- Flag Coat of arms
- Country: Germany
- State: Bavaria
- Adm. region: Middle Franconia
- Capital: Ansbach

Government
  - District admin.: Jürgen Ludwig (CSU)

Area
  - Total: 1,972 km^{2} (761 sq mi)

Population (31 December 2025)
  - Total: 187,487
  - Density: 95.07/km^{2} (246.2/sq mi)
- Time zone: UTC+01:00 (CET)
  - Summer (DST): UTC+02:00 (CEST)
- Vehicle registration: AN, DKB, FEU, ROT
- Website: landkreis-ansbach.de

Ansbach (German pronunciation: [ˈansbax]) is a Landkreis (district) in Bavaria, Germany. It surrounds – but does not include – the town of Ansbach; nonetheless the administrative seat of the district is located in Ansbach. It is the district with the largest area in Bavaria. At the end of December 2022, the district population was 188,623.

== History ==
Some of the local towns already existed during the lifetime of Charlemagne, who visited Feuchtwangen about 800. In the 13th century, the towns of Rothenburg, Dinkelsbühl and Feuchtwangen were elevated to Free Imperial cities; so they were directly subordinate to the Holy Roman Emperor. The town of Ansbach became subject to the Hohenzollern family, who established the state of Ansbach (later Brandenburg-Ansbach) in the region.

The district of Ansbach was established in 1972, when the former districts of Ansbach, Dinkelsbühl, Feuchtwangen and Rothenburg were merged. The historic town of Rothenburg lost its status as an urban district and was incorporated into the district.

== Geography ==
Ansbach is the largest district of Bavaria. Its northern half is occupied by the Franconian Heights, a gentle hilly countryside. The southern parts are covered with heaths and forests. The source of the Altmühl river is located in the district.

The district is bounded by (from the west and clockwise) the districts Ostalbkreis, Schwäbisch Hall and Main-Tauber (all in the state of Baden-Württemberg), and the districts of Neustadt (Aisch)-Bad Windsheim, Fürth, Roth, Weißenburg-Gunzenhausen and Donau-Ries.

== Coat of arms ==
The coat of arms displays:

- top left: the black and white arms of the Hohenzollern dynasty, who ruled the former state of Brandenburg-Ansbach
- top right: the red and white arms of Franconia
- bottom: the heraldic eagle of the Holy Roman Empire, which stands for the former Free Imperial cities of Rothenburg, Dinkelsbühl and Feuchtwangen

== Towns and municipalities ==
Clickable map of towns and municipalities in the district

Towns (Städte)
1. Dinkelsbühl
2. Feuchtwangen
3. Heilsbronn
4. Herrieden
5. Leutershausen
6. Merkendorf
7. Rothenburg ob der Tauber
8. Wassertrüdingen
9. Windsbach
Märkte
1. Arberg
2. Bechhofen
3. Colmberg
4. Dietenhofen
5. Dürrwangen
6. Flachslanden
7. Lehrberg
8. Lichtenau
9. Schopfloch
Municipalities
1. Aurach
2. Burgoberbach
3. Langfurth
4. Neuendettelsau
5. Oberdachstetten
6. Petersaurach
7. Sachsen
8. Schnelldorf

Verwaltungsgemeinschaften
1. Dentlein am Forst; 1. Burk; 2. Dentlein^{1,3}; 3. Wieseth; 2. Hesselberg; 1. Ehingen^{1}; 2. Gerolfingen; 3. Röckingen; 4. Unterschwaningen; 5. Wittelshofen	3. Rothenburg ob der Tauber; 1. Adelshofen; 2. Gebsattel; 3. Geslau; 4. Insingen; 5. Neusitz; 6. Ohrenbach; 7. Steinsfeld; 8. Windelsbach	4. Schillingsfürst; 1. Buch am Wald; 2. Diebach; 3. Dombühl^{3}; 4. Schillingsfürst^{1,2}; 5. Wettringen; 6. Wörnitz	5. Triesdorf; 1. Ornbau^{2}; 2. Weidenbach^{1,3}; 6. Weihenzell; 1. Bruckberg; 2. Rügland; 3. Weihenzell^{1}	7. Wilburgstetten; 1. Mönchsroth; 2. Weiltingen^{3}; 3. Wilburgstetten^{1}; 8. Wolframs-Eschenbach; 1. Mitteleschenbach; 2. Wolframs-Eschenbach^{1,2}
^{1}seat of the Verwaltungsgemeinschaft; ^{2}town; ^{3}Markt
