= Ohrenbach =

- Municipality
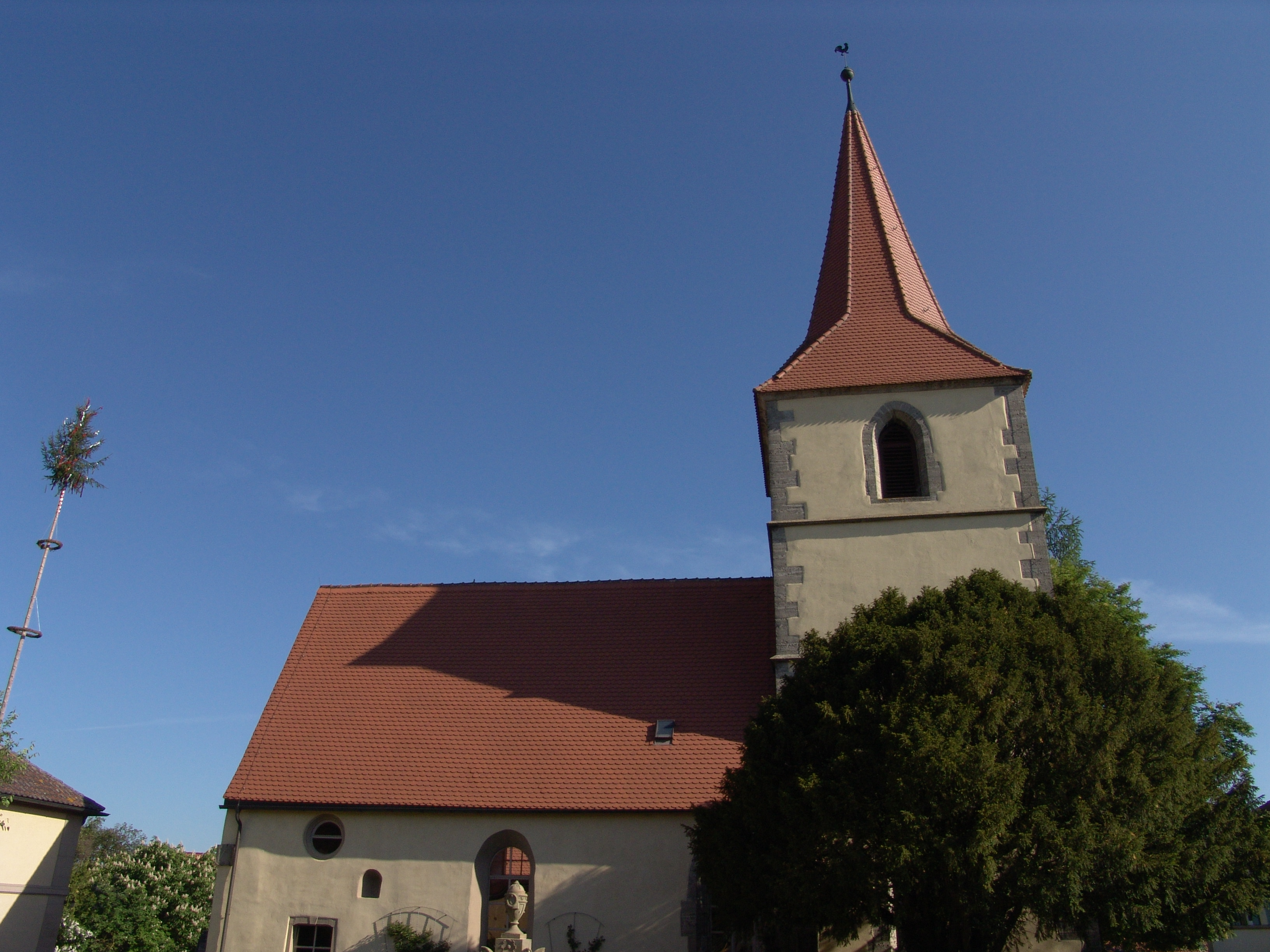
- Church of Saint John the Baptist

- Coat of arms

- Location of Ohrenbach within Ansbach district
- Interactive map of Ohrenbach
- Location within Germany Location within Bavaria
- Coordinates: 49°28′N 10°13′E
- Country: Germany
- State: Bavaria
- Admin. region: Mittelfranken
- District: Ansbach
- Municipal assoc.: Rothenburg ob der Tauber
- Subdivisions: 6 Ortsteile

Government
  - Mayor (2020–26): Johannes Hellenschmidt

Area
  - Total: 22.74 km^{2} (8.78 sq mi)
- Elevation: 409 m (1,342 ft)

Population (2025-12-31)
  - Total: 540
  - Density: 24/km^{2} (62/sq mi)
- Time zone: UTC+01:00 (CET)
  - Summer (DST): UTC+02:00 (CEST)
- Postal codes: 91620
- Dialling codes: 09865
- Vehicle registration: AN
- Website: www.ohrenbach.de

Ohrenbach (German pronunciation: [ˈoːʁənbax]) is a municipality in the district of Ansbach in Bavaria in Germany.
