= Adelshofen, Middle Franconia =

Adelshofen
- Municipality
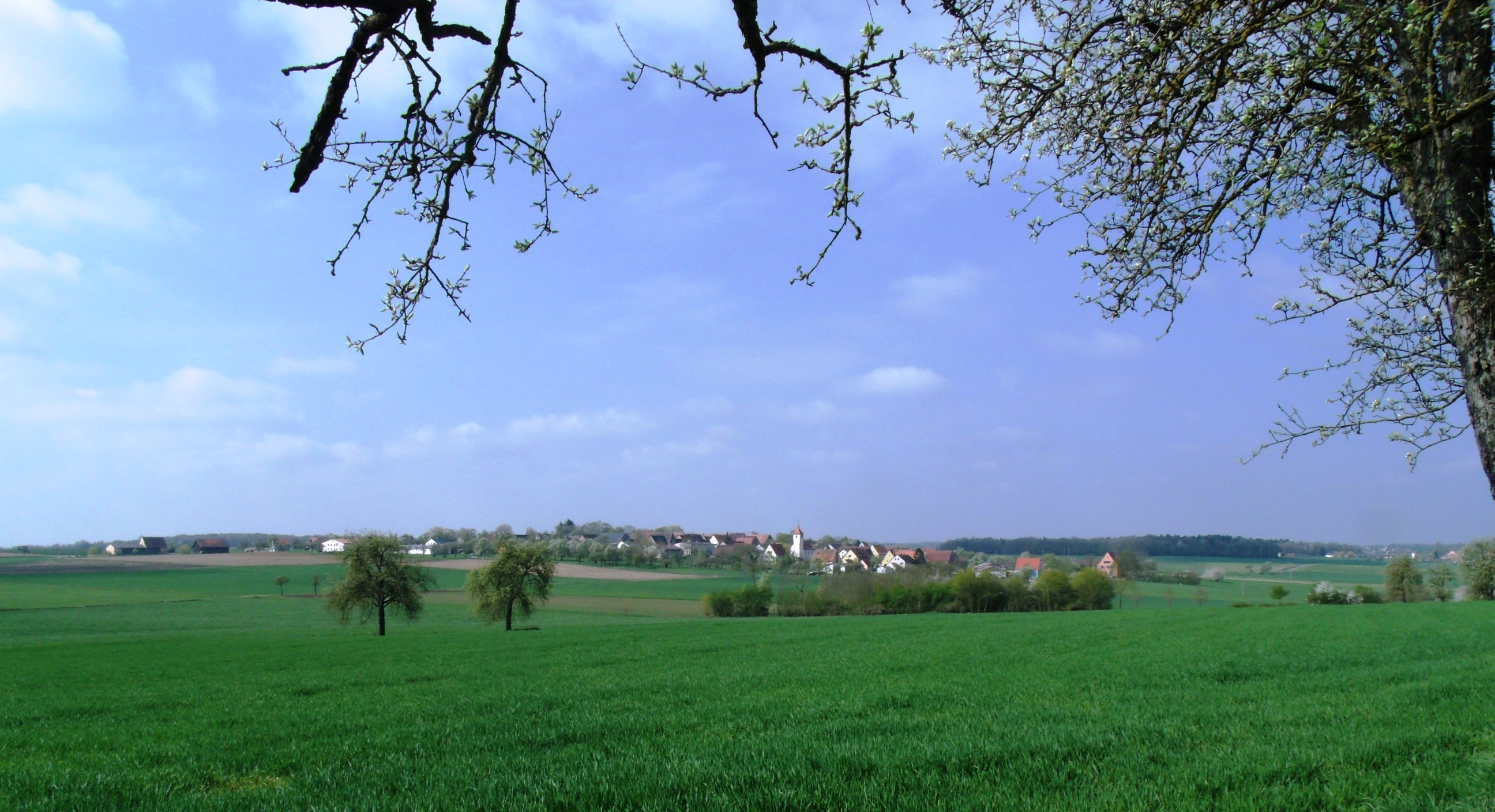
- Adelshofen

- Coat of arms

- Location of Adelshofen within Ansbach district
- Interactive map of Adelshofen
- Location within Germany Location within Bavaria
- Coordinates: 49°26′N 10°10′E
- Country: Germany
- State: Bavaria
- Admin. region: Mittelfranken
- District: Ansbach
- Municipal assoc.: Rothenburg ob der Tauber
- Subdivisions: 10 Ortsteile

Government
  - Mayor (2020–26): Johannes Schneider

Area
  - Total: 27.18 km^{2} (10.49 sq mi)
- Elevation: 429 m (1,407 ft)

Population (2025-12-31)
  - Total: 892
  - Density: 32.8/km^{2} (85.0/sq mi)
- Time zone: UTC+01:00 (CET)
  - Summer (DST): UTC+02:00 (CEST)
- Postal codes: 91587
- Dialling codes: 09865
- Vehicle registration: AN, DKB, FEU, ROT
- Website: Gemeinde Adelshofen

Adelshofen (German pronunciation: [aːdl̩sˈhoːfn̩]) is a municipality in the district of Ansbach in Bavaria in Germany.
