= Aurach, Germany =

Aurach
- Municipality
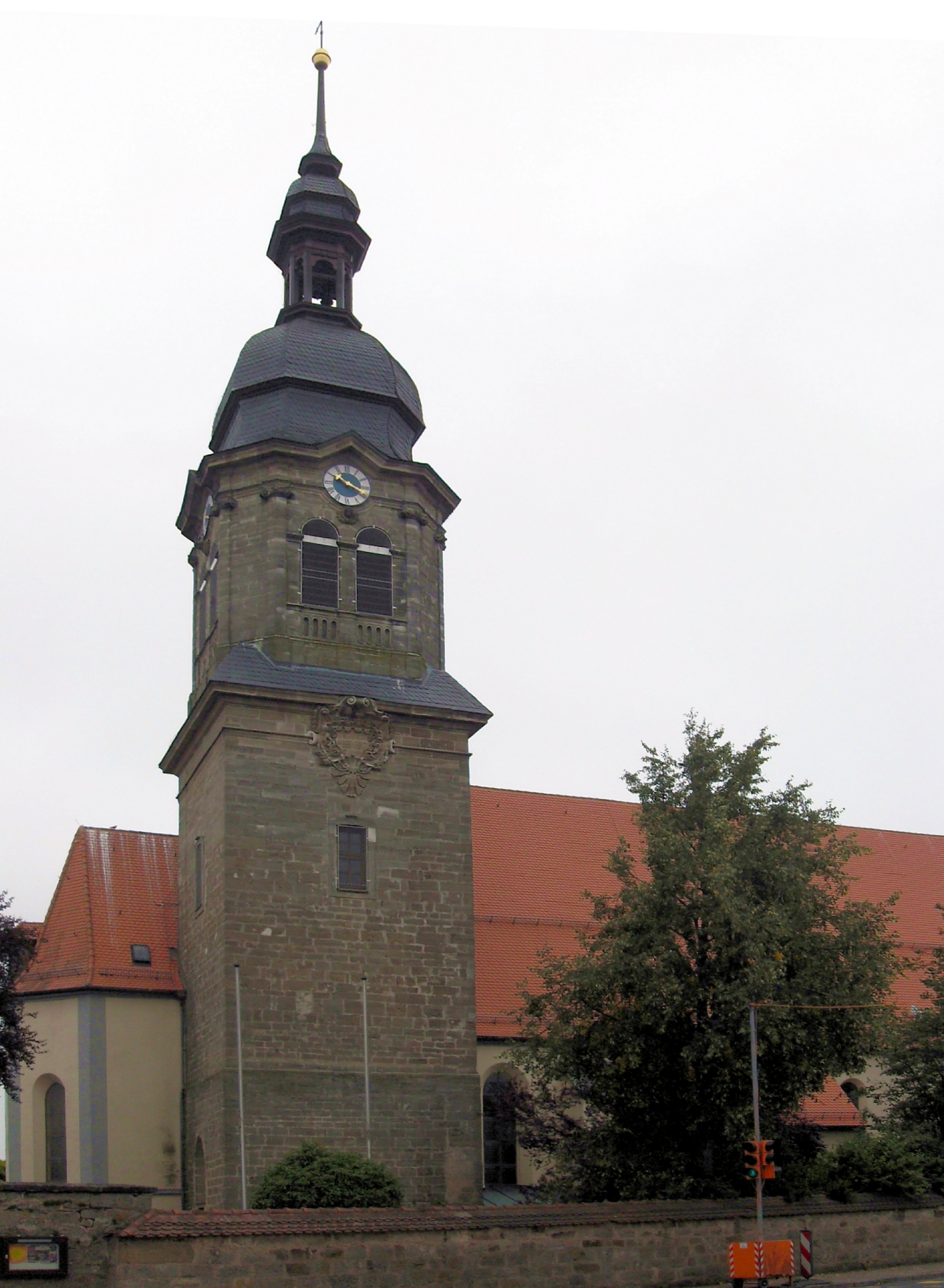
- Church in Aurach

- Coat of arms

- Location of Aurach within Ansbach district
- Interactive map of Aurach
- Location within Germany Location within Bavaria
- Coordinates: 49°15′N 10°25′E
- Country: Germany
- State: Bavaria
- Admin. region: Mittelfranken
- District: Ansbach
- Subdivisions: 14 Ortsteile

Government
  - Mayor (2020–26): Simon Göttfert

Area
  - Total: 36.66 km^{2} (14.15 sq mi)
- Elevation: 420–520 m (1,380–1,710 ft)

Population (2025-12-31)
  - Total: 3,102
  - Density: 84.62/km^{2} (219.2/sq mi)
- Time zone: UTC+01:00 (CET)
  - Summer (DST): UTC+02:00 (CEST)
- Postal codes: 91589
- Dialling codes: 09804
- Vehicle registration: AN
- Website: www.aurach.de

Aurach (German pronunciation: [ˈaʊʁax]) is a municipality in the district of Ansbach in Bavaria, Germany.
