= Bechhofen =

- Municipality
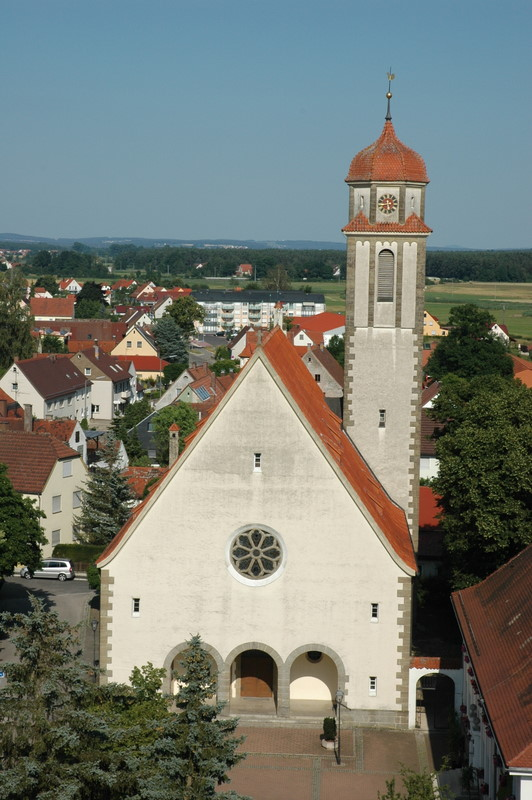
- Church of Saint John the Baptist

- Coat of arms

- Location of Bechhofen within Ansbach district
- Interactive map of Bechhofen
- Location within Germany Location within Bavaria
- Coordinates: 49°8′N 10°33′E
- Country: Germany
- State: Bavaria
- Admin. region: Mittelfranken
- District: Ansbach
- Subdivisions: 28 Ortsteile

Government
  - Mayor (2024–30): Sven Waidmann (CSU)

Area
  - Total: 61.85 km^{2} (23.88 sq mi)
- Elevation: 431 m (1,414 ft)

Population (2025-12-31)
  - Total: 6,287
  - Density: 101.6/km^{2} (263.3/sq mi)
- Time zone: UTC+01:00 (CET)
  - Summer (DST): UTC+02:00 (CEST)
- Postal codes: 91572
- Dialling codes: 09822
- Vehicle registration: AN
- Website: www.markt-bechhofen.de

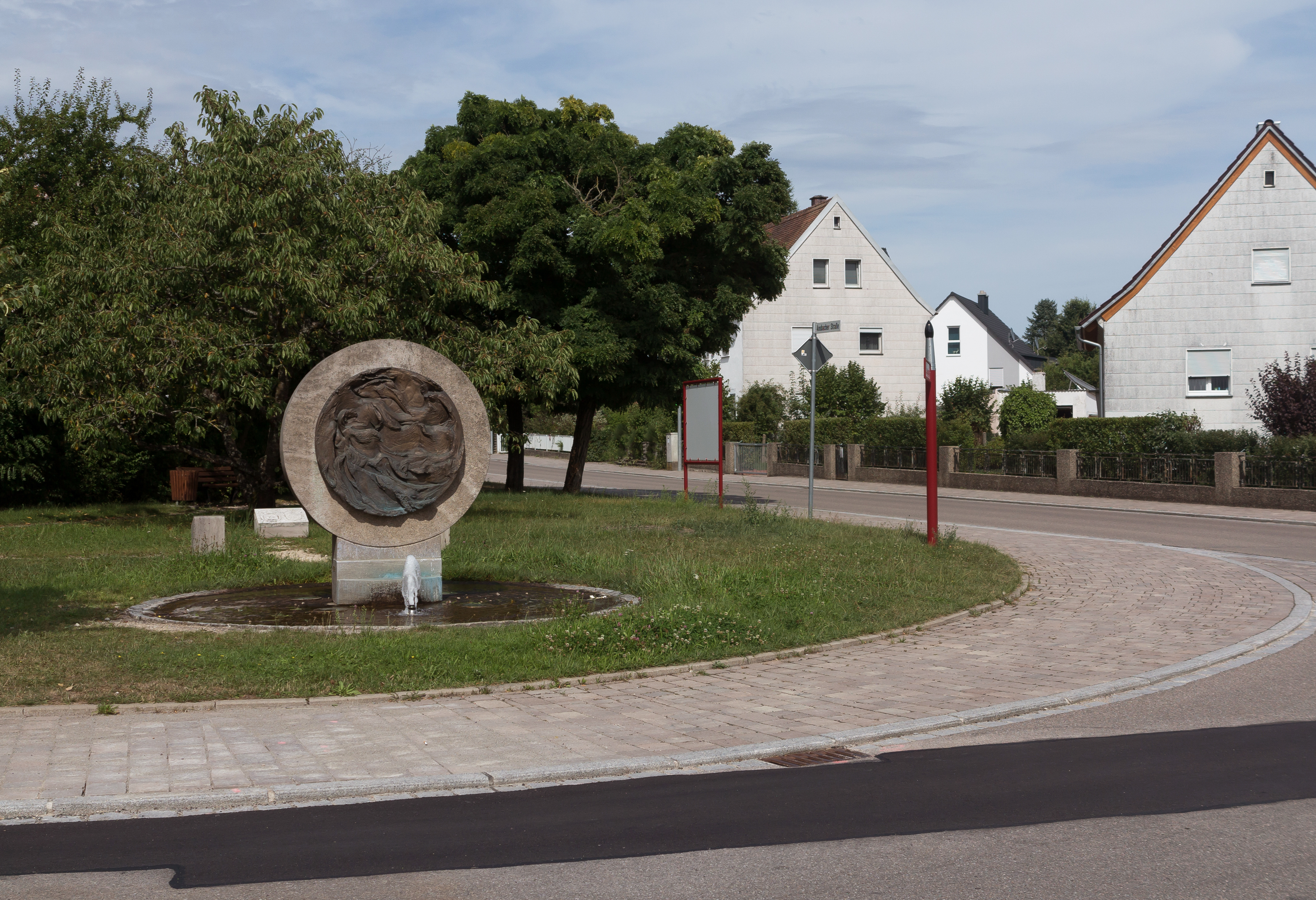
Bechhofen, sculpture

Bechhofen (German pronunciation: [bɛçˈhoːfn̩]) is a market town and municipality in the district of Ansbach in Bavaria in Germany.
