= Weihenzell (Verwaltungsgemeinschaft) =

- Verwaltungsgemeinschaft
- Location of Weihenzell within Ansbach district
- Interactive map of Weihenzell
- Location within Germany Location within Bavaria
- Coordinates: 49°21′N 10°38′E
- Country: Germany
- State: Bavaria
- Admin. region: Middle Franconia
- District: Ansbach
- Seat: Weihenzell
- Subdivisions: 3 municipalities

Area
  - Total: 73.74 km^{2} (28.47 sq mi)

Population (2025-12-31)
  - Total: 5,477
  - Density: 74.27/km^{2} (192.4/sq mi)
- Time zone: UTC+01:00 (CET)
  - Summer (DST): UTC+02:00 (CEST)
- Website: www.vg-weihenzell.de

Weihenzell is a Verwaltungsgemeinschaft (municipal association) in the district of Ansbach in Bavaria, Germany. Its seat is in Weihenzell.

It consists of the following municipalities:

1. Bruckberg
2. Rügland
3. Weihenzell
