= Wilburgstetten (Verwaltungsgemeinschaft) =

- Verwaltungsgemeinschaft
- Location of Wilburgstetten within Ansbach district
- Interactive map of Wilburgstetten
- Location within Germany Location within Bavaria
- Coordinates: 49°02′N 10°24′E
- Country: Germany
- State: Bavaria
- Admin. region: Middle Franconia
- District: Ansbach
- Seat: Wilburgstetten
- Subdivisions: 3 municipalities

Area
  - Total: 61.22 km^{2} (23.64 sq mi)

Population (2025-12-31)
  - Total: 5,031
  - Density: 82.18/km^{2} (212.8/sq mi)
- Time zone: UTC+01:00 (CET)
  - Summer (DST): UTC+02:00 (CEST)
- Website: www.vg-wilburgstetten.de

Wilburgstetten is a Verwaltungsgemeinschaft (municipal association) in the district of Ansbach in Bavaria, Germany. Its seat is in Wilburgstetten.

It consists of the following municipalities:

1. Mönchsroth
2. Weiltingen
3. Wilburgstetten
