= Dentlein am Forst (Verwaltungsgemeinschaft) =

- Verwaltungsgemeinschaft
- Location of Dentlein am Forst within Ansbach district
- Interactive map of Dentlein am Forst
- Location within Germany Location within Bavaria
- Coordinates: 49°09′N 10°25′E
- Country: Germany
- State: Bavaria
- Admin. region: Middle Franconia
- District: Ansbach
- Seat: Dentlein
- Subdivisions: 3 municipalities

Area
  - Total: 52.68 km^{2} (20.34 sq mi)

Population (2025-12-31)
  - Total: 4,743
  - Density: 90.03/km^{2} (233.2/sq mi)
- Time zone: UTC+01:00 (CET)
  - Summer (DST): UTC+02:00 (CEST)
- Website: www.dentlein.de

Dentlein am Forst is a Verwaltungsgemeinschaft (municipal association) in the district of Ansbach in Bavaria, Germany. Its seat is in Dentlein.

It consists of the following municipalities:

1. Burk
2. Dentlein
3. Wieseth
