= Ornbau =

- Town
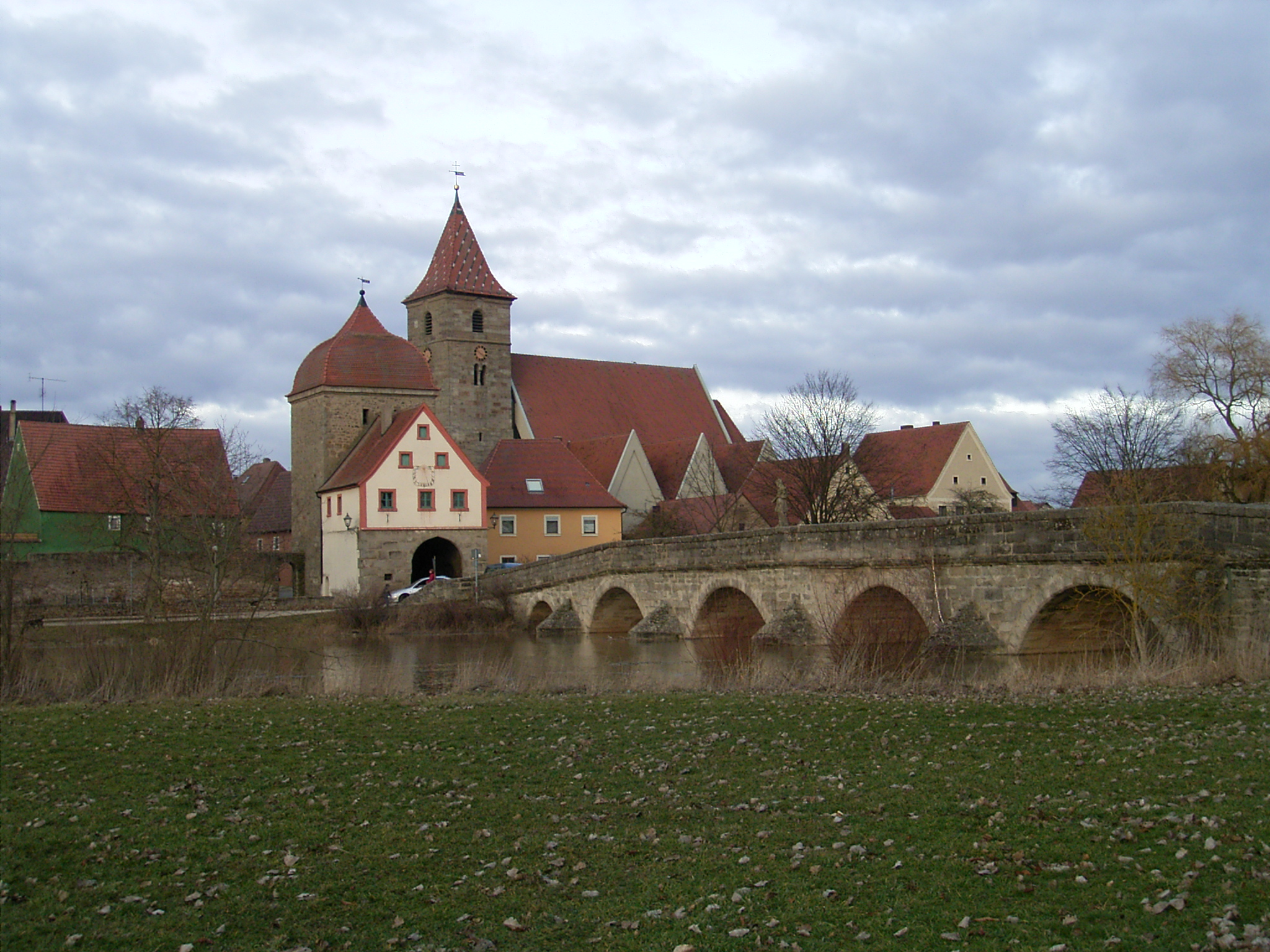
- Ornbau with Altmühlbrücke

- Coat of arms

- Location of Ornbau within Ansbach district
- Interactive map of Ornbau
- Location within Germany Location within Bavaria
- Coordinates: 49°10′40″N 10°39′20″E
- Country: Germany
- State: Bavaria
- Admin. region: Mittelfranken
- District: Ansbach
- Municipal assoc.: Triesdorf
- Subdivisions: 6 Ortsteile

Government
  - Mayor (2020–26): Marco Meier

Area
  - Total: 15.16 km^{2} (5.85 sq mi)
- Elevation: 419 m (1,375 ft)

Population (2025-12-31)
  - Total: 1,747
  - Density: 115.2/km^{2} (298.5/sq mi)
- Time zone: UTC+01:00 (CET)
  - Summer (DST): UTC+02:00 (CEST)
- Postal codes: 91737
- Dialling codes: 09826
- Vehicle registration: AN
- Website: www.ornbau.de

Ornbau (German pronunciation: [ˈɔʁnbaʊ]) is a walled town in the district of Ansbach, in Bavaria, Germany. It is situated on the river Altmühl, 15 km southeast of Ansbach.

== Smallest town (Stadt) in Bavaria ==
Ornbau is the smallest (population) town in the German state of Bavaria. Its designation as a town dates back to medieval times because a wall and a moat surround the town.

== Medieval town ==
The town wall and the church are approximately 700 years old. The wall, the bridge, and the original steeple are still standing and in good condition. The town lies near the Roman town of Gunzenhausen, which was an outpost on the Roman Limes Line, one of the largest structures ever constructed by mankind.

On the chimney of the "old schoolhouse" there are giant crane nests that have stood for centuries. They are a source of pride for the citizens of Ornbau.

== German Mercedes-Benz Club rally ==
Every year, an estimated 500 classic Mercedes-Benz cars from throughout Germany, and Europe gather in Ornbau in the largest mercedesbenzclubs.de gathering of the year. Thousands attend annually.
