= Dentlein =

Dentlein am Forst
- Municipality
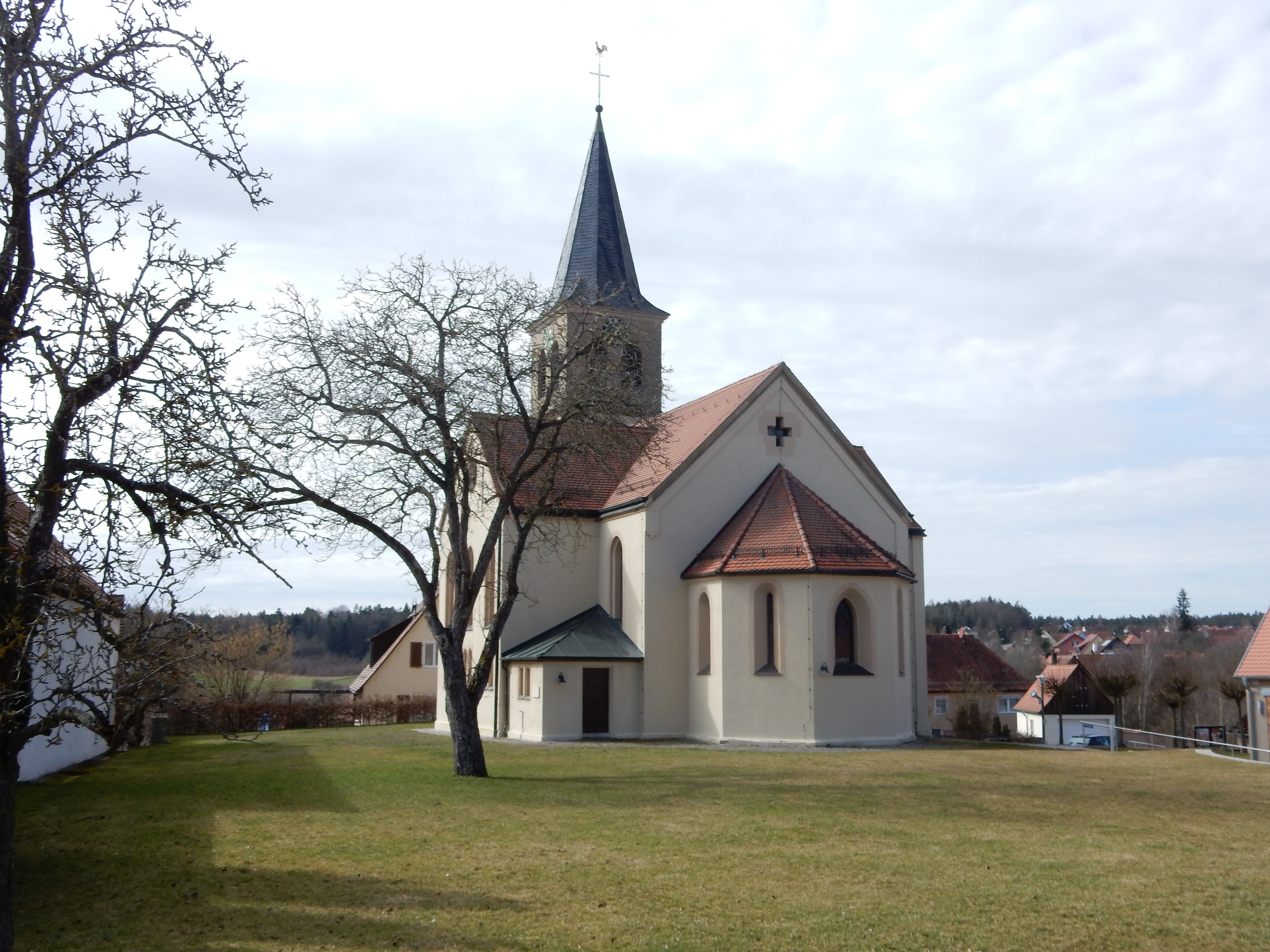
- Church of Saint Ursula

- Coat of arms

- Location of Dentlein am Forst within Ansbach district
- Interactive map of Dentlein am Forst
- Location within Germany Location within Bavaria
- Coordinates: 49°08′N 10°25′E
- Country: Germany
- State: Bavaria
- Admin. region: Mittelfranken
- District: Ansbach
- Municipal assoc.: Dentlein am Forst

Government
  - Mayor (2020–26): Thomas Beck

Area
  - Total: 18.01 km^{2} (6.95 sq mi)
- Elevation: 481 m (1,578 ft)

Population (2025-12-31)
  - Total: 2,320
  - Density: 129/km^{2} (334/sq mi)
- Time zone: UTC+01:00 (CET)
  - Summer (DST): UTC+02:00 (CEST)
- Postal codes: 91599
- Dialling codes: 09855
- Vehicle registration: AN
- Website: www.dentlein.de

Dentlein am Forst (German pronunciation: [ˈdɛntlaɪn ʔam ˈfɔʁst], lit. 'Dentlein at the Forest') is a municipality in the district of Ansbach in Bavaria in Germany.
