= Burk, Bavaria =

Burk
- Municipality
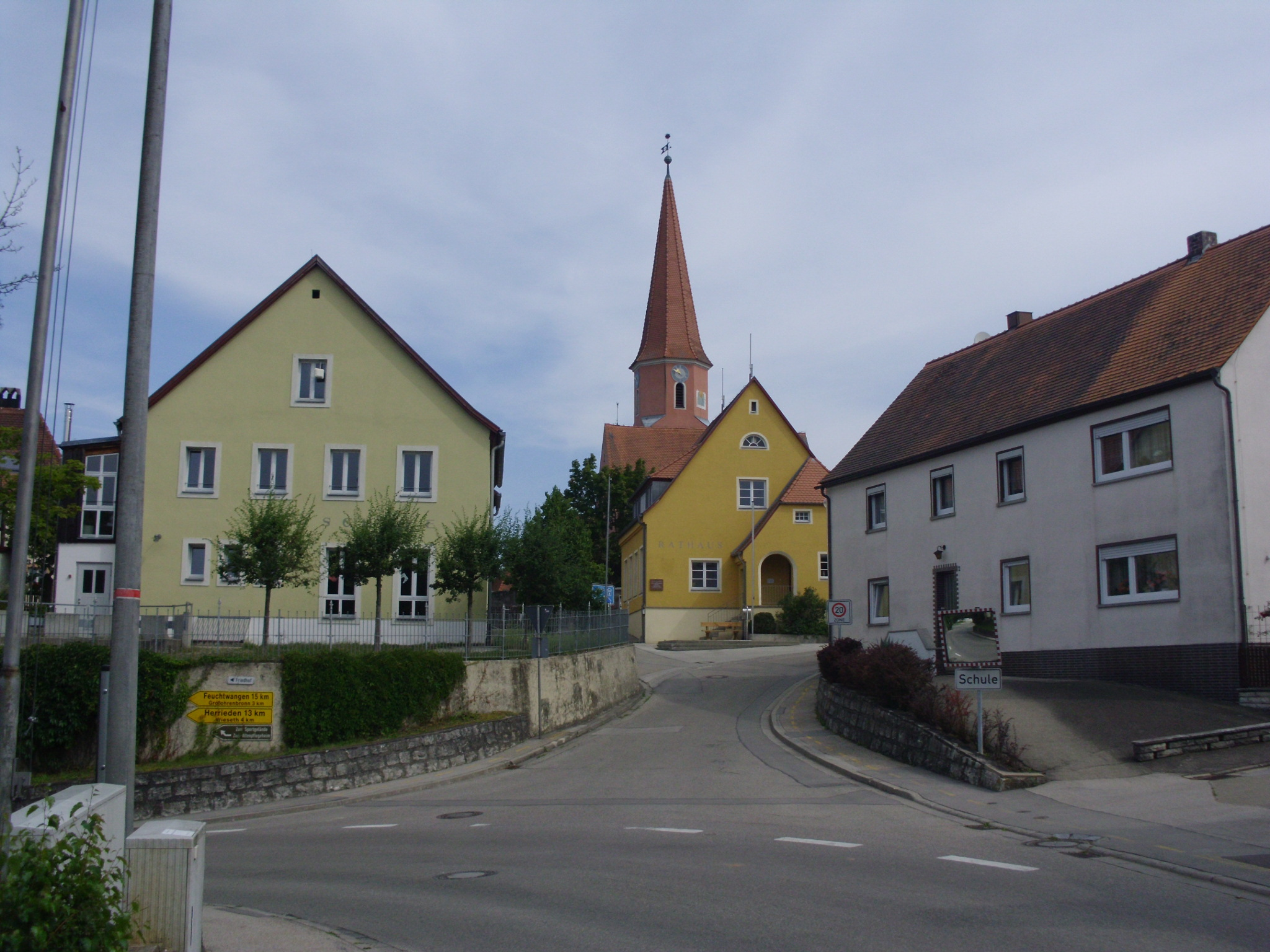
- Center of Burk with the municipal office and the Church of Saints Blaise, Nicholas and Michael

- Coat of arms

- Location of Burk within Ansbach district
- Interactive map of Burk
- Location within Germany Location within Bavaria
- Coordinates: 49°7′N 10°28′E
- Country: Germany
- State: Bavaria
- Admin. region: Mittelfranken
- District: Ansbach
- Municipal assoc.: Dentlein am Forst

Government
  - Mayor (2020–26): Georg Held

Area
  - Total: 14.08 km^{2} (5.44 sq mi)
- Elevation: 466 m (1,529 ft)

Population (2025-12-31)
  - Total: 1,101
  - Density: 78.20/km^{2} (202.5/sq mi)
- Time zone: UTC+01:00 (CET)
  - Summer (DST): UTC+02:00 (CEST)
- Postal codes: 91596
- Dialling codes: 09822
- Vehicle registration: AN
- Website: www.gemeinde-burk.de

Burk (German pronunciation: [bʊʁk]) is a municipality in the district of Ansbach in Bavaria in Germany.
