= Neusitz =

- Municipality
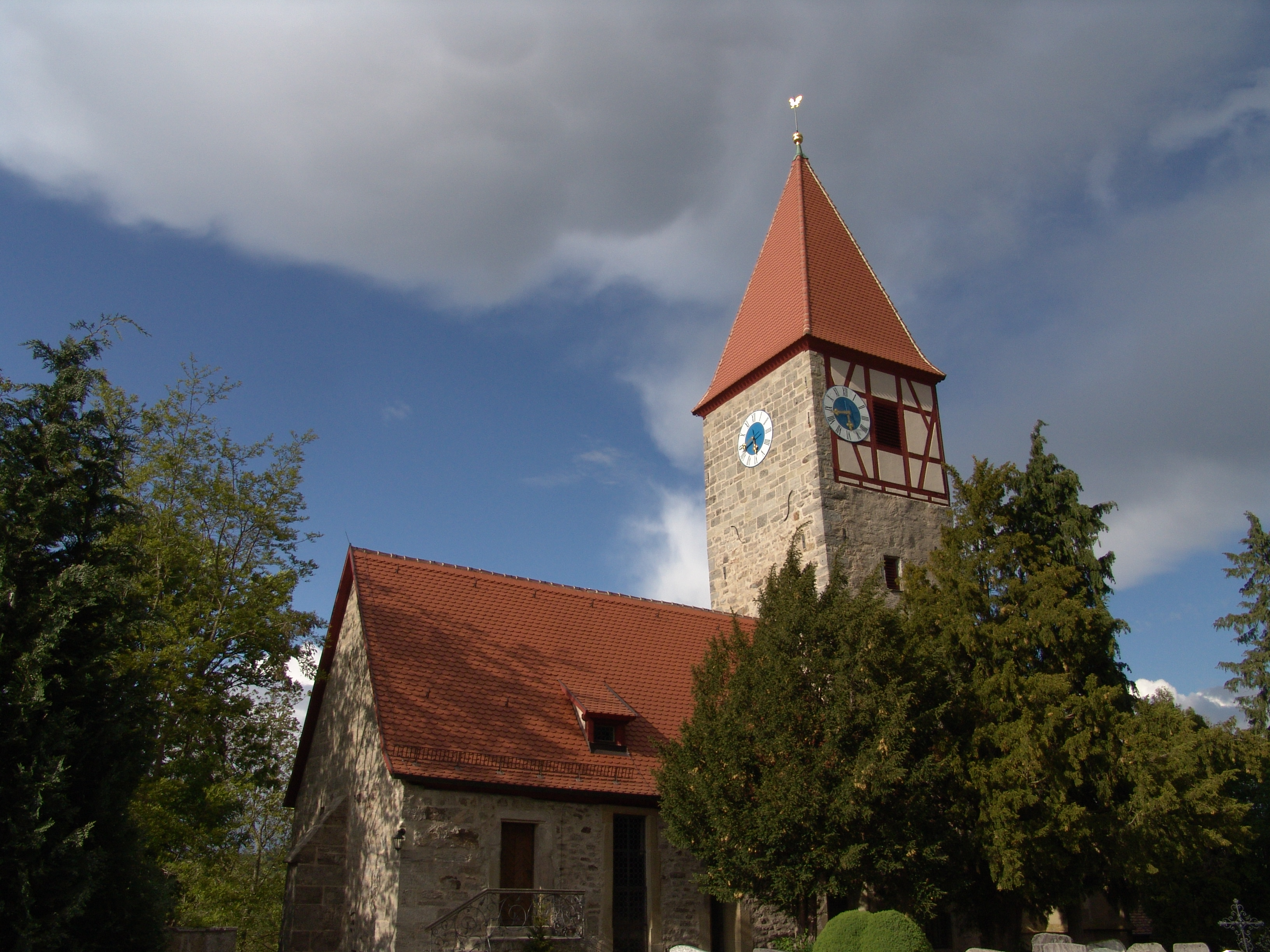
- Church of the Holy Cross

- Coat of arms

- Location of Neusitz within Ansbach district
- Interactive map of Neusitz
- Location within Germany Location within Bavaria
- Coordinates: 49°22′N 10°13′E
- Country: Germany
- State: Bavaria
- Admin. region: Mittelfranken
- District: Ansbach
- Municipal assoc.: Rothenburg ob der Tauber
- Subdivisions: 5 Ortsteile

Government
  - Mayor (2020–26): Manuel Döhler

Area
  - Total: 13.78 km^{2} (5.32 sq mi)
- Elevation: 400 m (1,300 ft)

Population (2025-12-31)
  - Total: 1,941
  - Density: 140.9/km^{2} (364.8/sq mi)
- Time zone: UTC+01:00 (CET)
  - Summer (DST): UTC+02:00 (CEST)
- Postal codes: 91616
- Dialling codes: 09861
- Vehicle registration: AN
- Website: www.neusitz.de

Neusitz (German pronunciation: [ˈnɔʏzɪts]) is a municipality in the district of Ansbach in Bavaria in Germany.
