= Mönchsroth =

- Municipality
- Coat of arms

- Location of Mönchsroth within Ansbach district
- Interactive map of Mönchsroth
- Location within Germany Location within Bavaria
- Coordinates: 49°01′11″N 10°21′33″E
- Country: Germany
- State: Bavaria
- Admin. region: Mittelfranken
- District: Ansbach
- Municipal assoc.: Wilburgstetten
- Subdivisions: 4 Ortsteile

Government
  - Mayor (2023–29): Franziska Mattmann

Area
  - Total: 11.92 km^{2} (4.60 sq mi)
- Elevation: 441 m (1,447 ft)

Population (2025-12-31)
  - Total: 1,646
  - Density: 138.1/km^{2} (357.6/sq mi)
- Time zone: UTC+01:00 (CET)
  - Summer (DST): UTC+02:00 (CEST)
- Postal codes: 91614
- Dialling codes: 09853
- Vehicle registration: AN
- Website: www.moenchsroth.de

Mönchsroth (German pronunciation: [ˈmœnçsˌʁoːt]) is a municipality in the district of Ansbach in Bavaria in Germany.
