= Wolframs-Eschenbach (Verwaltungsgemeinschaft) =

- Verwaltungsgemeinschaft
- Location of Wolframs-Eschenbach within Ansbach district
- Interactive map of Wolframs-Eschenbach
- Location within Germany Location within Bavaria
- Coordinates: 49°14′N 10°43′E
- Country: Germany
- State: Bavaria
- Admin. region: Middle Franconia
- District: Ansbach
- Seat: Wolframs-Eschenbach
- Subdivisions: 2 municipalities

Area
  - Total: 35.98 km^{2} (13.89 sq mi)

Population (2025-12-31)
  - Total: 5,005
  - Density: 139.1/km^{2} (360.3/sq mi)
- Time zone: UTC+01:00 (CET)
  - Summer (DST): UTC+02:00 (CEST)
- Website: www.wolframs-eschenbach.de

Wolframs-Eschenbach is a Verwaltungsgemeinschaft (municipal association) in the district of Ansbach in Bavaria, Germany. Its seat is in Wolframs-Eschenbach.

It consists of the following municipalities:

1. Mitteleschenbach
2. Wolframs-Eschenbach
