= Mitteleschenbach =

- Municipality
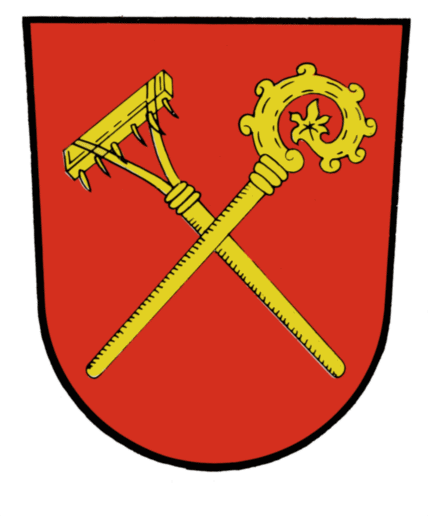
- Coat of arms

- Location of Mitteleschenbach within Ansbach district
- Interactive map of Mitteleschenbach
- Location within Germany Location within Bavaria
- Coordinates: 49°13′N 10°46′E
- Country: Germany
- State: Bavaria
- Admin. region: Mittelfranken
- District: Ansbach
- Municipal assoc.: Wolframs-Eschenbach
- Subdivisions: 2 Ortsteile

Government
  - Mayor (2020–26): Stefan Bußinger

Area
  - Total: 10.51 km^{2} (4.06 sq mi)
- Elevation: 407 m (1,335 ft)

Population (2025-12-31)
  - Total: 1,701
  - Density: 161.8/km^{2} (419.2/sq mi)
- Time zone: UTC+01:00 (CET)
  - Summer (DST): UTC+02:00 (CEST)
- Postal codes: 91734
- Dialling codes: 09871
- Vehicle registration: AN
- Website: www.mitteleschenbach.de

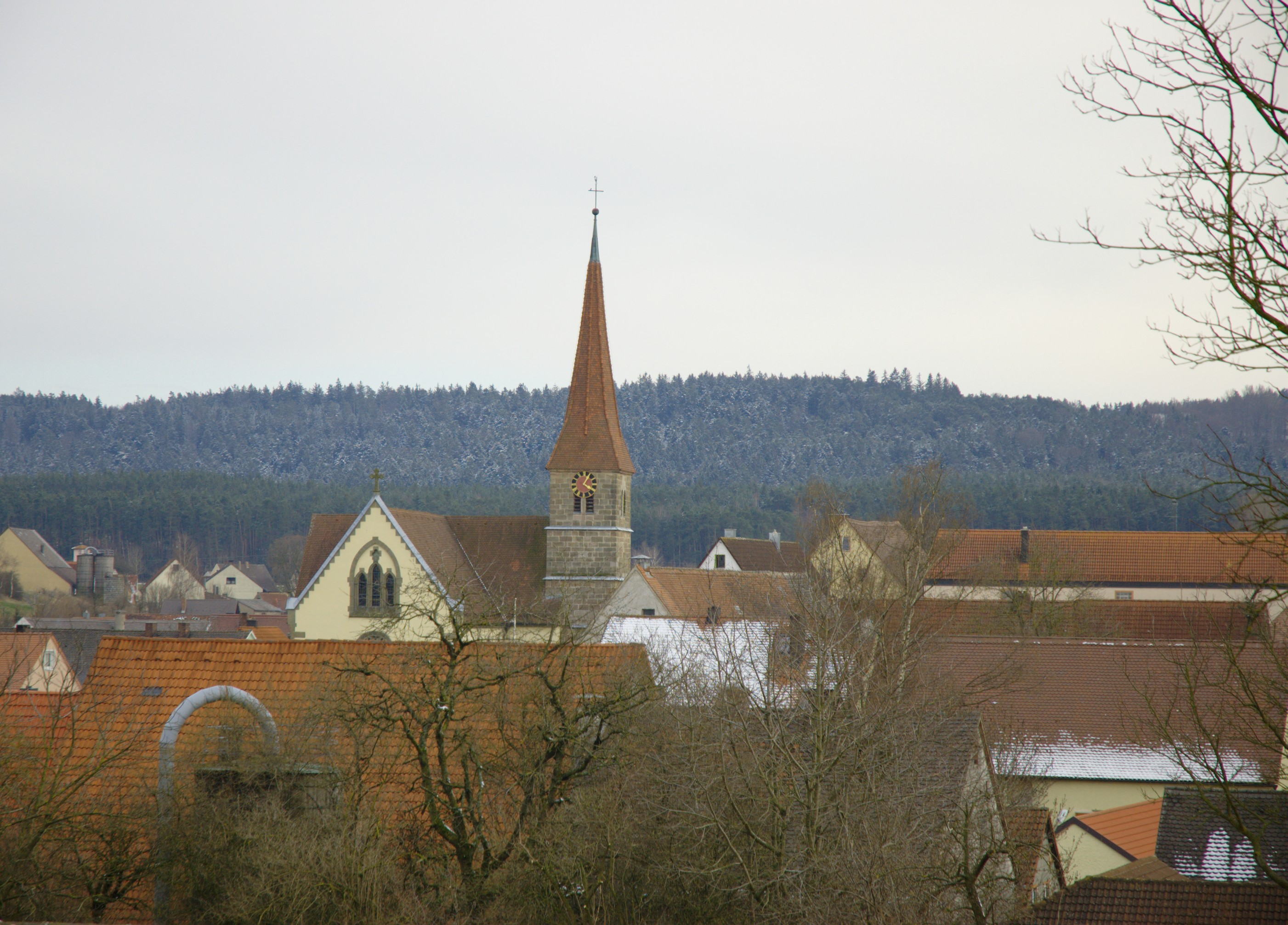
Mitteleschenbach (2008).

Mitteleschenbach is a municipality in the district of Ansbach in Bavaria in Germany.
