= Gebsattel =

- Municipality
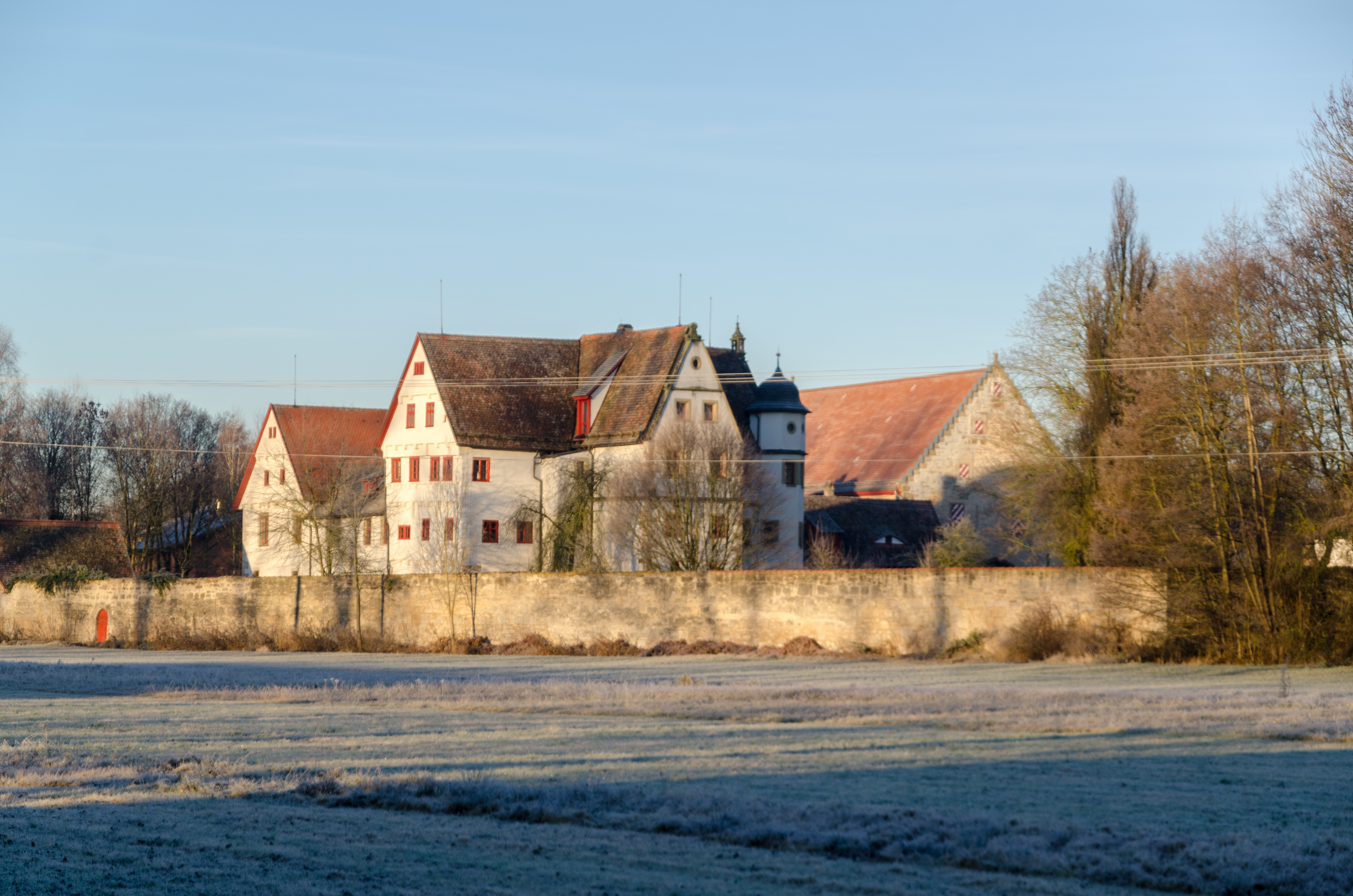
- Gebsattel Castle

- Coat of arms

- Location of Gebsattel within Ansbach district
- Interactive map of Gebsattel
- Location within Germany Location within Bavaria
- Coordinates: 49°21′N 10°11′E
- Country: Germany
- State: Bavaria
- Admin. region: Mittelfranken
- District: Ansbach
- Municipal assoc.: Rothenburg ob der Tauber
- Subdivisions: 3 Ortsteile

Government
  - Mayor (2020–26): Gerd Rößler

Area
  - Total: 19.12 km^{2} (7.38 sq mi)
- Elevation: 378 m (1,240 ft)

Population (2025-12-31)
  - Total: 1,746
  - Density: 91.32/km^{2} (236.5/sq mi)
- Time zone: UTC+01:00 (CET)
  - Summer (DST): UTC+02:00 (CEST)
- Postal codes: 91607
- Dialling codes: 09861
- Vehicle registration: AN
- Website: www.gebsattel.de

Gebsattel is a municipality in the district of Ansbach in Bavaria in Germany. It lies on the Tauber River.

== Main sights ==
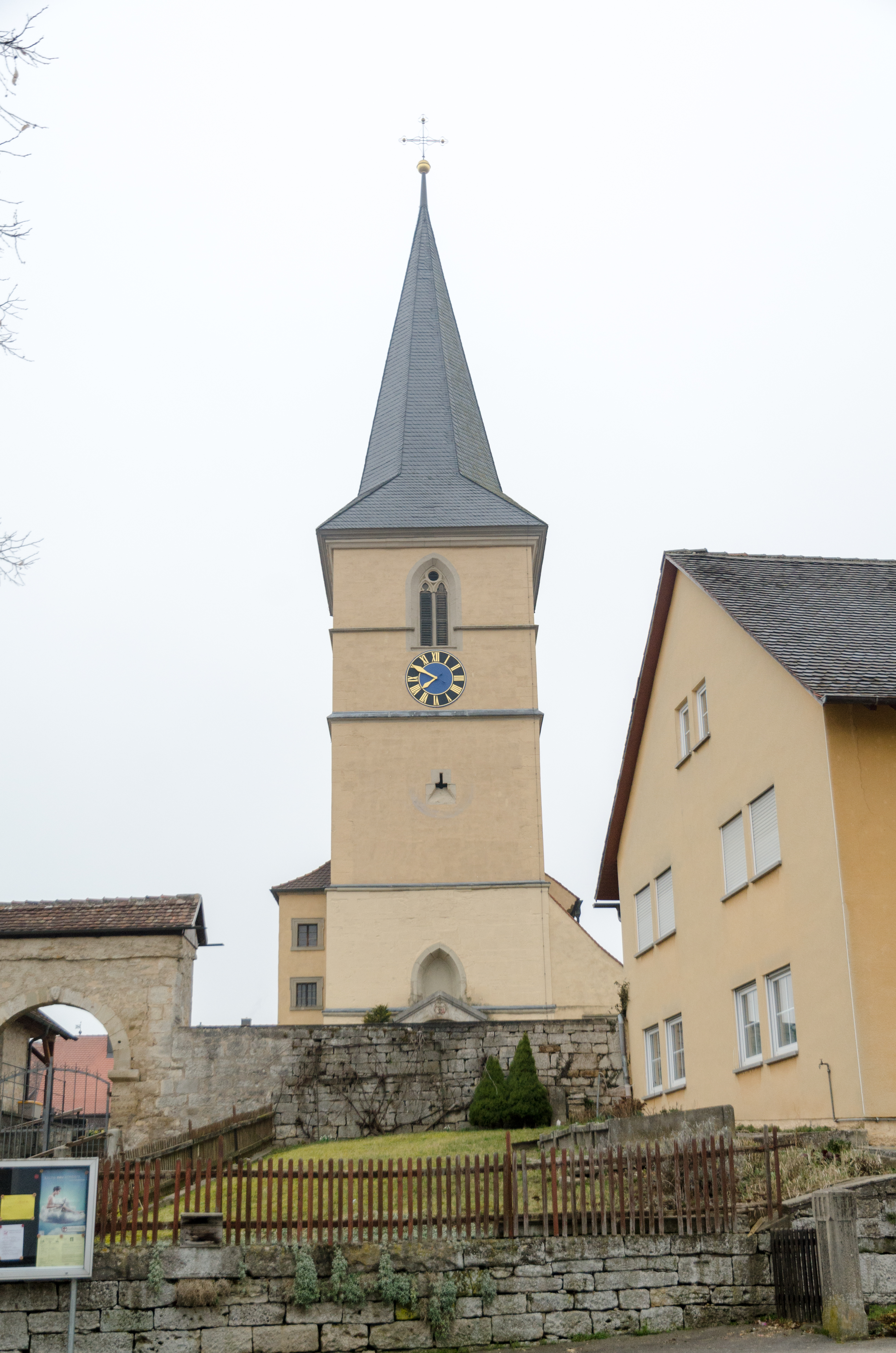
Catholic church of Saint Laurentius

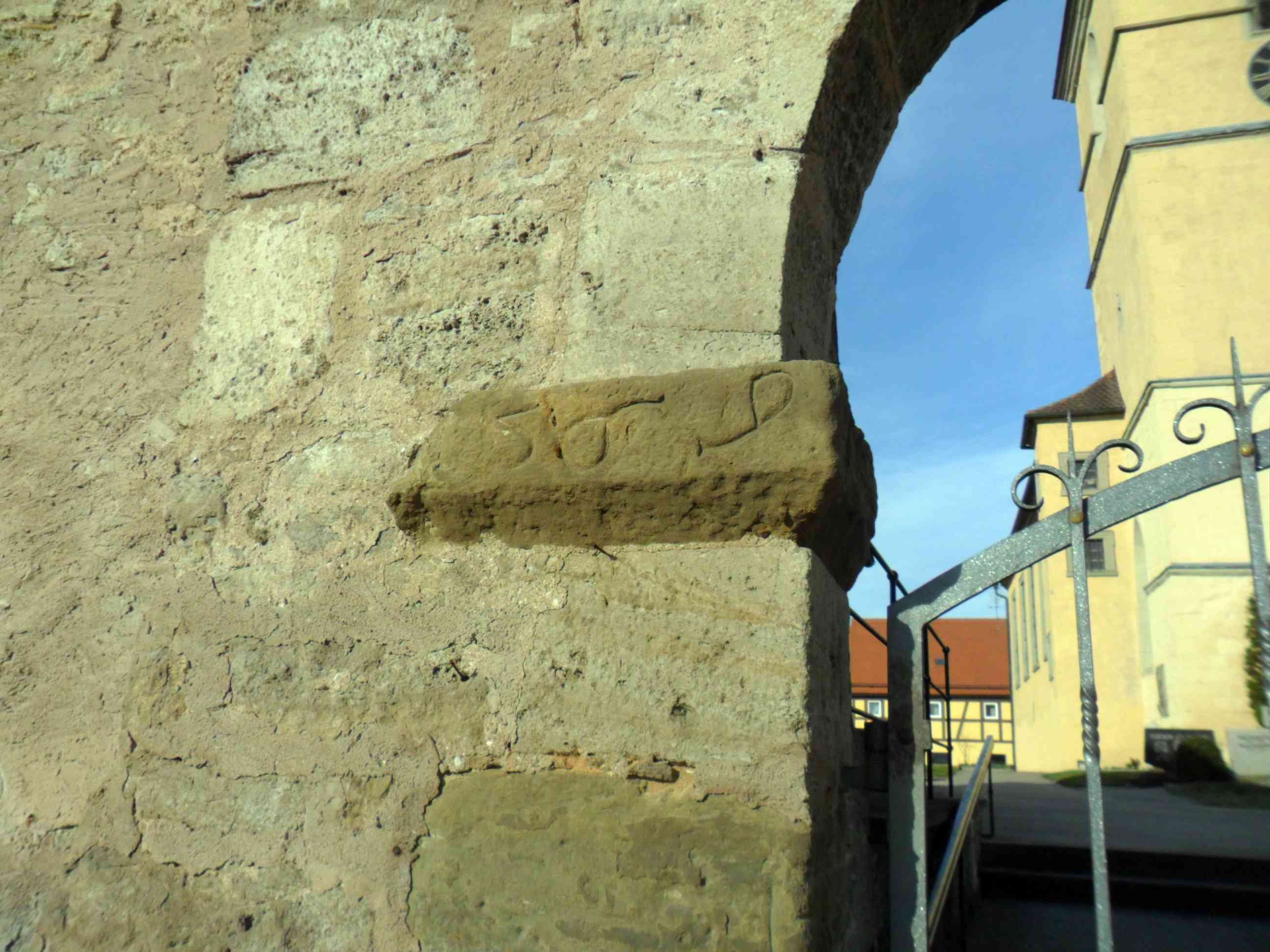
One of the old gates

== Neighborhoods, districts ==
Gebsattel has nine neighborhoods or districts:

- Bockenfeld
- Eckartshof
- Gebsattel
- Kirnberg
- Pleikartshof
- Rödersdorf
- Speierhof
- Wasenmühle
- Wildenhof
