= Merkendorf, Bavaria =

Merkendorf
- Town
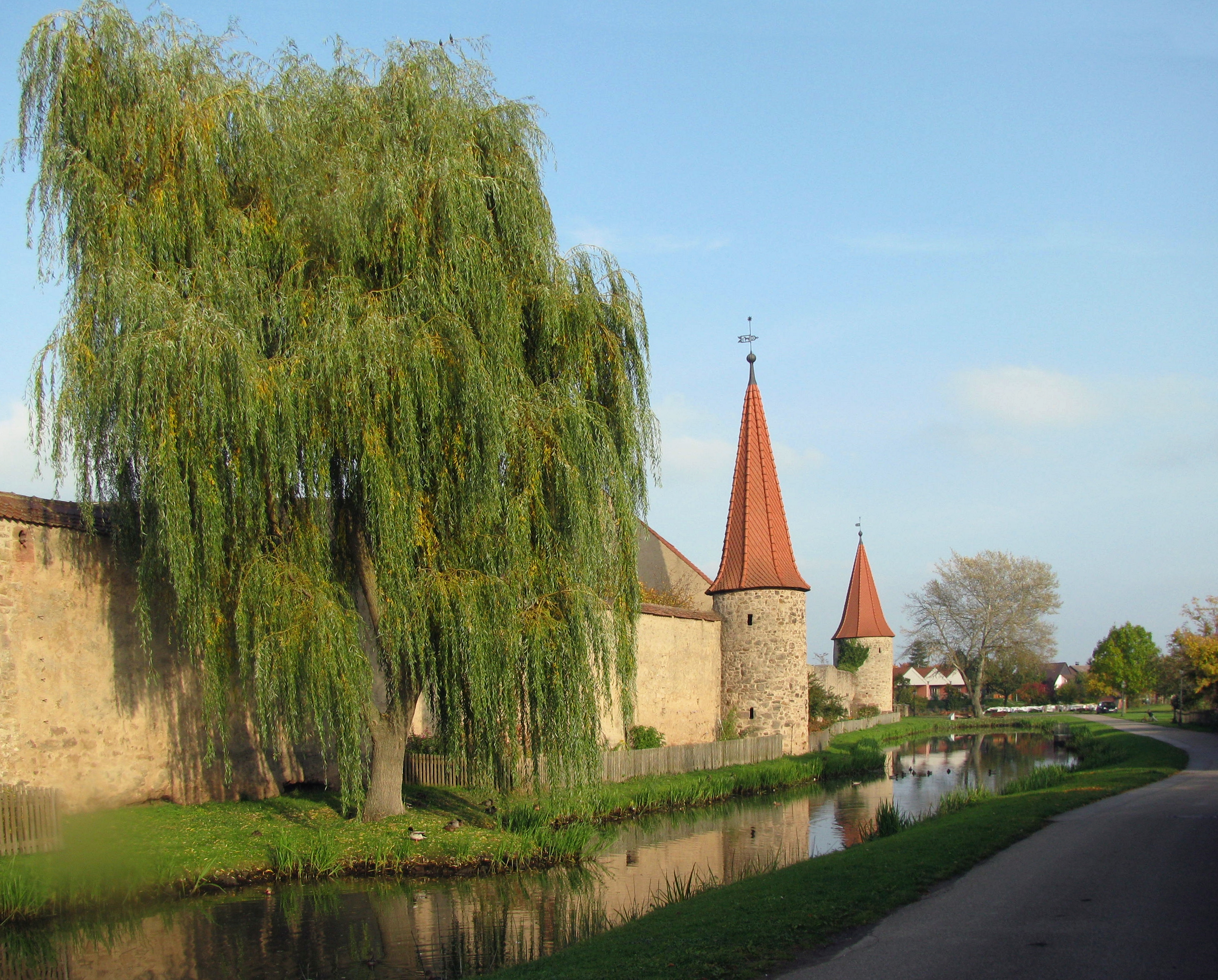
- City wall in Merkendorf

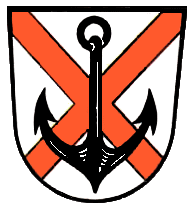
- Coat of arms

- Location of Merkendorf within Ansbach district
- Interactive map of Merkendorf
- Location within Germany Location within Bavaria
- Coordinates: 49°12′N 10°41′E
- Country: Germany
- State: Bavaria
- Admin. region: Mittelfranken
- District: Ansbach
- Subdivisions: 13 Ortsteile

Government
  - Mayor (2020–26): Stefan Bach

Area
  - Total: 26.07 km^{2} (10.07 sq mi)
- Elevation: 438 m (1,437 ft)

Population (2025-12-31)
  - Total: 3,114
  - Density: 119.4/km^{2} (309.4/sq mi)
- Time zone: UTC+01:00 (CET)
  - Summer (DST): UTC+02:00 (CEST)
- Postal codes: 91732
- Dialling codes: 09826, 09875
- Vehicle registration: AN, DKB, FEU, ROT
- Website: www.merkendorf.de

Merkendorf (German: [ˈmɛʁkn̩ˌdɔʁf]) is a town and municipality in the district of Ansbach, in Bavaria, Germany. It is situated 14 km southeast of Ansbach.
