= Weidenbach, Bavaria =

Weidenbach
- Municipality
- Coat of arms

- Location of Weidenbach within Ansbach district
- Interactive map of Weidenbach
- Location within Germany Location within Bavaria
- Coordinates: 49°12′N 10°37′E
- Country: Germany
- State: Bavaria
- Admin. region: Mittelfranken
- District: Ansbach
- Municipal assoc.: Triesdorf
- Subdivisions: 9 Ortsteile

Government
  - Mayor (2020–26): Willi Albrecht

Area
  - Total: 21.71 km^{2} (8.38 sq mi)
- Elevation: 437 m (1,434 ft)

Population (2025-12-31)
  - Total: 2,490
  - Density: 115/km^{2} (297/sq mi)
- Time zone: UTC+01:00 (CET)
  - Summer (DST): UTC+02:00 (CEST)
- Postal codes: 91746
- Dialling codes: 09826
- Vehicle registration: AN
- Website: www.weidenbach-triesdorf.de

Weidenbach (German pronunciation: [ˈvaɪdn̩bax]) is a municipality in the district of Ansbach in Bavaria in Germany.

== History ==
Weidenbach was first named as "Widenwang im Schwabfeldgau" in a document from 845. From the medieval times up to 1791 Weidenbach was part of the Principality of Ansbach. After a short time under Prussian rule the principality and, too, Weidenbach became part of the newly created Bavarian Kingdom.
