= Ruffenhofen Roman Park =

Archaeological museum in Germany

Coordinates: 49°02′47.21″N 10°28′49.97″E

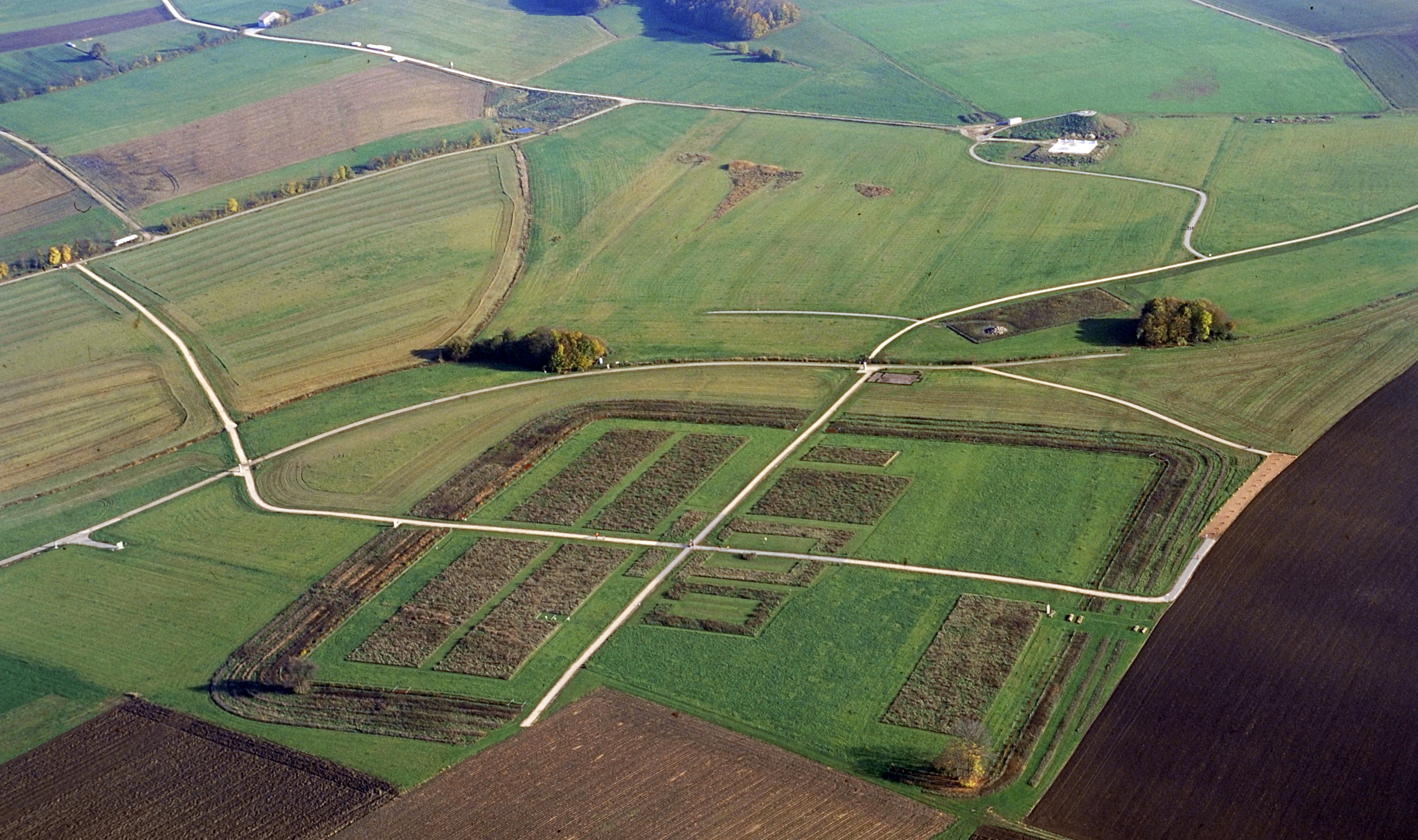
Aerial photograph of the planted castellum with an observation mound behind (October 2008)

Ruffenhofen Roman Park (German: Römerpark Ruffenhofen) is an archaeological park in der region of Hesselberg in the south of the county of Ansbach in the German state of Bavaria. Covering an area of about 40 hectares, the Roman fort of Ruffenhofen Castle as well as large elements of the associated civilian settlement have survived underground and have not been built over.

The "Roman Park" is situated within the municipalities of Gerolfingen, Weiltingen and Wittelshofen. In 2001, these villages founded the Ruffenhofen Roman Fort Special Purpose Association (Zweckverband Römerkastell Ruffenhofen) in order to make the area accessible for tourism, to market it and to protect it in the long term. In addition, scientific research of the site is ensured. The ancient fortification lies around 2.2 km from the Upper Germanic-Rhaetian Limes. The castellum is a heritage site under the Bavarian Monument Conservation Act.

== Literature ==
- Matthias Pausch: Möglichkeiten und Erfahrungen der Visualisierung im Kastell Ruffenhofen. In: Peter Henrich (ed.): Perspektiven der Limesforschung. Beiträge zum Welterbe Limes Bd. 5. Theiss, Stuttgart, 2010, pp. 190–201.
- Matthias Pausch (ed.): Römisches Ruffenhofen. Entdeckungen am Welterbe Limes. Wißner, Augsburg, 2009, ISBN 978-3-89639-699-0.
- Matthias Pausch: Limeskastell und Vicus Ruffenhofen (Mittelfranken). Ein Welterbe blüht als Römerpark neu auf. In: Rieser Kulturtage. Dokumentationen. 17, 2008. Nördlingen, 2009, pp. 23–48.
- Matthias Pausch: Visualisierungen und Bepflanzungen am Limes. Erste Erfahrungen und Überlegungen aus Ruffenhofen. In: Denkmalpflege Informationen. Issue B, No.1 39. Bayerisches Landesamt für Denkmalpflege, Munich, 2008, pp. 42ff.
