= Gutenbach (Sulzach) =

River in Bavaria, Germany

Location
- Country: Germany
- State: Bavaria

Physical characteristics
- Source
  - location: northeast of Dorfgütingen, a district of Feuchtwangen
  - coordinates: 49°14′02″N 10°16′40″E
- Mouth
  - location: into the Sulzach southwest of Dorfgütingen, a district of Feuchtwangen
  - coordinates: 49°12′46″N 10°19′02″E

Basin features
- Progression: Sulzach→ Wörnitz→ Danube→ Black Sea

Gutenbach is a river of Bavaria, Germany. It springs northeast of Dorfgütingen, a district of Feuchtwangen. It is a right tributary of the Sulzach southwest of Dorfgütingen.

== See also ==
- List of rivers of Bavaria
