= Hesselberg (Verwaltungsgemeinschaft) =

- Verwaltungsgemeinschaft
- Location of Hesselberg within Ansbach district
- Interactive map of Hesselberg
- Location within Germany Location within Bavaria
- Coordinates: 49°05′N 10°32′E
- Country: Germany
- State: Bavaria
- Admin. region: Middle Franconia
- District: Ansbach
- Seat: Ehingen
- Subdivisions: 5 municipalities

Area
  - Total: 113.89 km^{2} (43.97 sq mi)

Population (2025-12-31)
  - Total: 5,737
  - Density: 50.37/km^{2} (130.5/sq mi)
- Time zone: UTC+01:00 (CET)
  - Summer (DST): UTC+02:00 (CEST)
- Website: www.vg-hesselberg.de

Hesselberg is a Verwaltungsgemeinschaft (municipal association) in the district of Ansbach in Bavaria, Germany. Its seat is in Ehingen. It takes its name from the hill Hesselberg.

It consists of the following municipalities:

1. Ehingen
2. Gerolfingen
3. Röckingen
4. Unterschwaningen
5. Wittelshofen
