= Ehingen (disambiguation) =

Ehingen may refer to the following places in Germany:

- Ehingen, in the Alb-Donau district, Baden-Württemberg
- Ehingen, Middle Franconia, in the district of Ansbach, Bavaria
- Ehingen, Swabia, in the district of Augsburg, Bavaria
- Ehingen am Ries, in the Donau-Ries district, Bavaria
