= Holzgraben =

Holzgraben may refer to:

- Holzgraben (Fulda), a river of Hesse, Germany, tributary of the Fulda
- Holzgraben (Altmühl), a river of Bavaria, Germany, tributary of the Altmühl
