= Cornelia Dumler =

German volleyball player (born 1982)

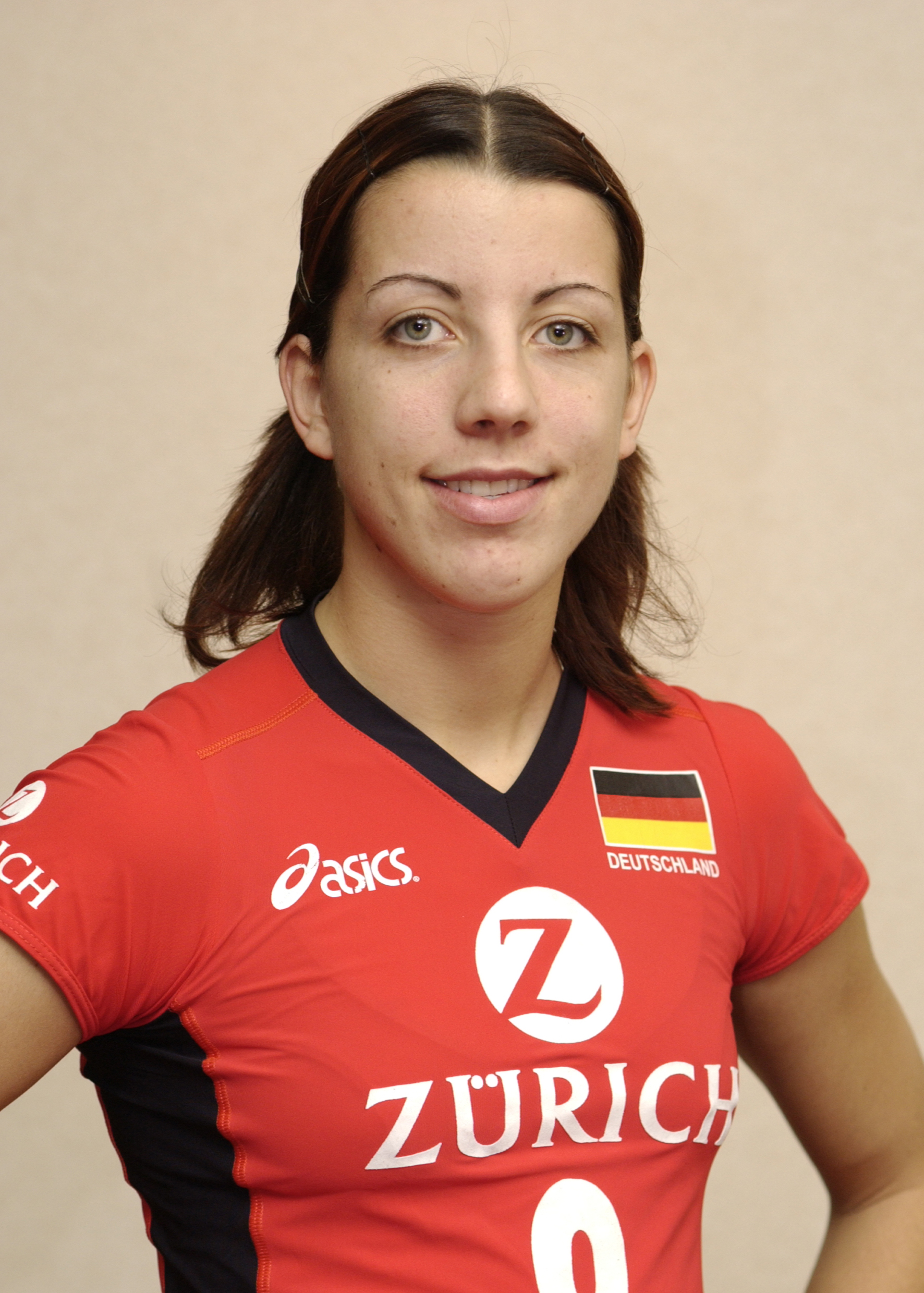

Personal information
- Nickname: Conny
- Nationality: German
- Born: January 22, 1982 (age 44); Feuchtwangen, West Germany
Honours
Women's volleyball
Representing Germany
European Championship
| Bronze medal – third place | 2003 Ankara | Team competition |

Cornelia Dumler (born January 22, 1982), nicknamed "Conny", is a German volleyball player; she played as an outside-hitter for the German Women's National Team since 2002.

She represented her native country in at the 2004 Summer Olympics, finishing in ninth place, and at the 2003 Women's European Volleyball Championship, finishing third.

== Honours ==
- 2003 European Championship — 3rd place
- 2004 Olympic Games — 9th place
- 2005 FIVB World Grand Prix — 10th place
- 2005 European Championship — 11th place
- 2006 World Championship — 11th place
- 2007 European Championship — 6th place
