= Ehingen, Middle Franconia =

Ehingen
- Municipality
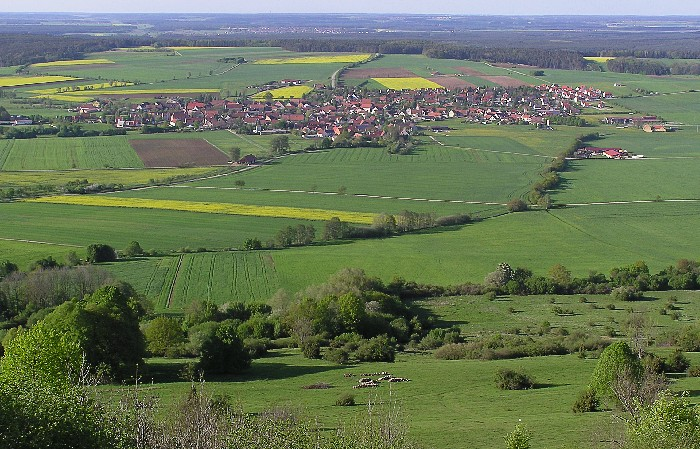
- Ehingen seen from Hesselberg

- Coat of arms

- Location of Ehingen within Ansbach district
- Interactive map of Ehingen
- Location within Germany Location within Bavaria
- Coordinates: 49°05′N 10°32′E
- Country: Germany
- State: Bavaria
- Admin. region: Mittelfranken
- District: Ansbach
- Municipal assoc.: Hesselberg
- Subdivisions: 16 Ortsteile

Government
  - Mayor (2020–26): Friedrich Steinacker

Area
  - Total: 47.6 km^{2} (18.4 sq mi)
- Elevation: 465 m (1,526 ft)

Population (2025-12-31)
  - Total: 1,941
  - Density: 40.8/km^{2} (106/sq mi)
- Time zone: UTC+01:00 (CET)
  - Summer (DST): UTC+02:00 (CEST)
- Postal codes: 91725
- Dialling codes: 09835
- Vehicle registration: AN
- Website: www.ehingen-hesselberg.de

Ehingen (German pronunciation: [ˈeː(h)ɪŋən]; East Franconian: Ehing) is a municipality in the district of Ansbach in Bavaria in Germany.
