= Holzgraben (Altmühl) =

River in Germany

Location
- Country: Germany
- State: Bavaria

Physical characteristics
- Source
  - location: Wehlenberg, Muhr am See
  - coordinates: 49.1600°N 10.7270°E
- Mouth
  - location: Altenmuhr, Muhr am See
  - coordinates: 49.1571°N 10.7037°E

Basin features
- Progression: Altmühl→ Danube→ Black Sea

Holzgraben is a small river of Bavaria, Germany. It is a left tributary of the Altmühl at Muhr am See.

== See also ==
- List of rivers of Bavaria
