= Sulzach =

River in Germany

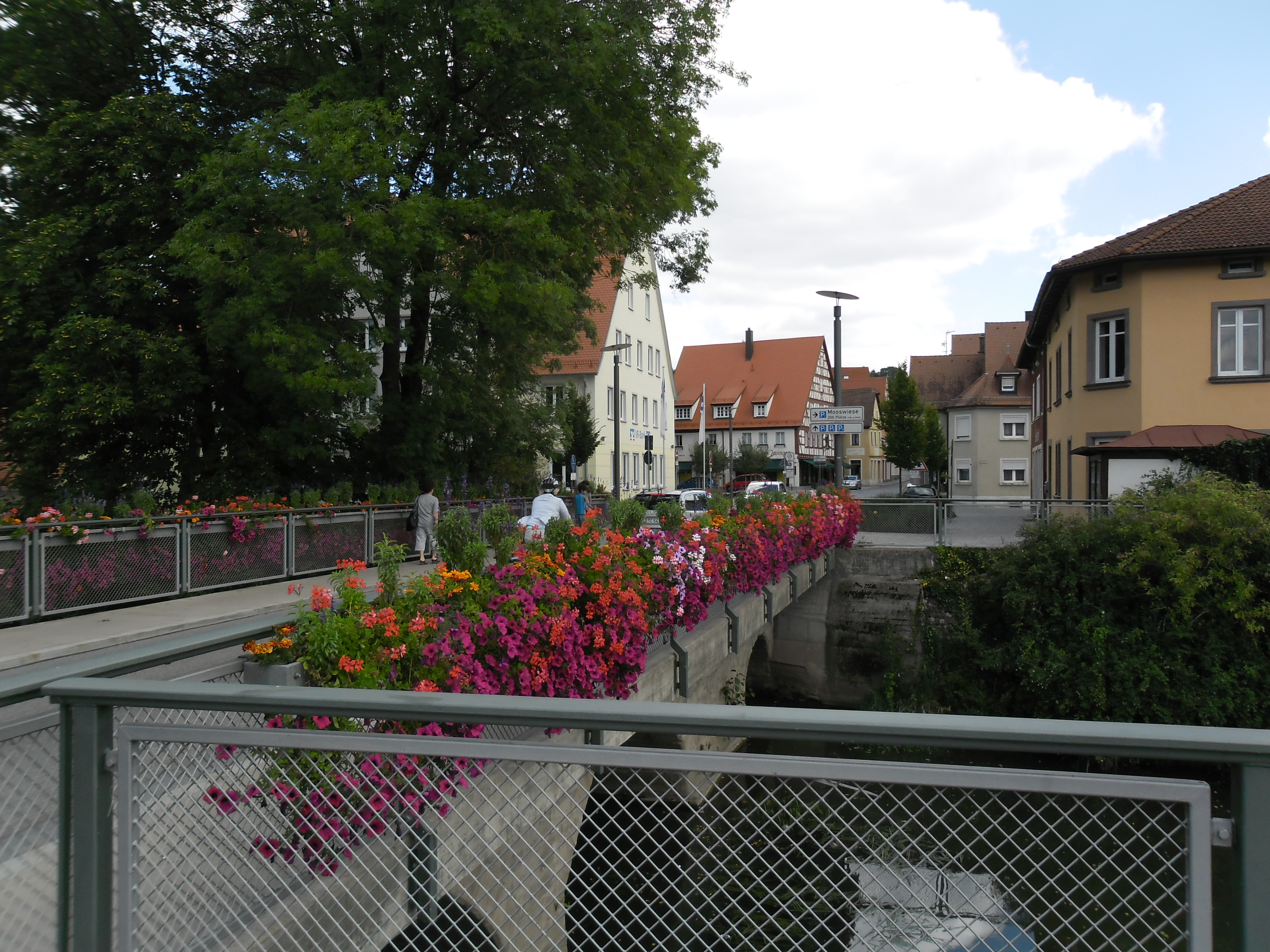
- Bridge over the Sulzach, decorated with flowers, in Feuchtwangen

Location
- Country: Germany
- State: Bavaria

Physical characteristics
- Source
  - elevation: 515 m (1,690 ft)
- Mouth
  - location: Wörnitz at Wittelshofen
  - coordinates: 49.0594°N 10.4857°E
  - elevation: 427 m (1,401 ft)
- Length: 41.5 km (25.8 mi)
- Basin size: 191 km^{2} (74 sq mi)

Basin features
- Progression: Wörnitz→ Danube→ Black Sea

Sulzach is a river of Bavaria, Germany. It flows into the Wörnitz near Wittelshofen.

== See also ==
- List of rivers of Bavaria
