= Unterschwaningen =

- Municipality
- Coat of arms

- Location of Unterschwaningen within Ansbach district
- Interactive map of Unterschwaningen
- Location within Germany Location within Bavaria
- Coordinates: 49°04′N 10°37′E
- Country: Germany
- State: Bavaria
- Admin. region: Mittelfranken
- District: Ansbach
- Municipal assoc.: Hesselberg
- Subdivisions: 3 Ortsteile

Government
  - Mayor (2020–26): Markus Bauer

Area
  - Total: 18.57 km^{2} (7.17 sq mi)
- Elevation: 442 m (1,450 ft)

Population (2025-12-31)
  - Total: 854
  - Density: 46.0/km^{2} (119/sq mi)
- Time zone: UTC+01:00 (CET)
  - Summer (DST): UTC+02:00 (CEST)
- Postal codes: 91743
- Dialling codes: 09836
- Vehicle registration: AN
- Website: www.unterschwaningen.de

Unterschwaningen is a municipality in the district of Ansbach in Bavaria in Germany.
