= Röckingen =

- Municipality
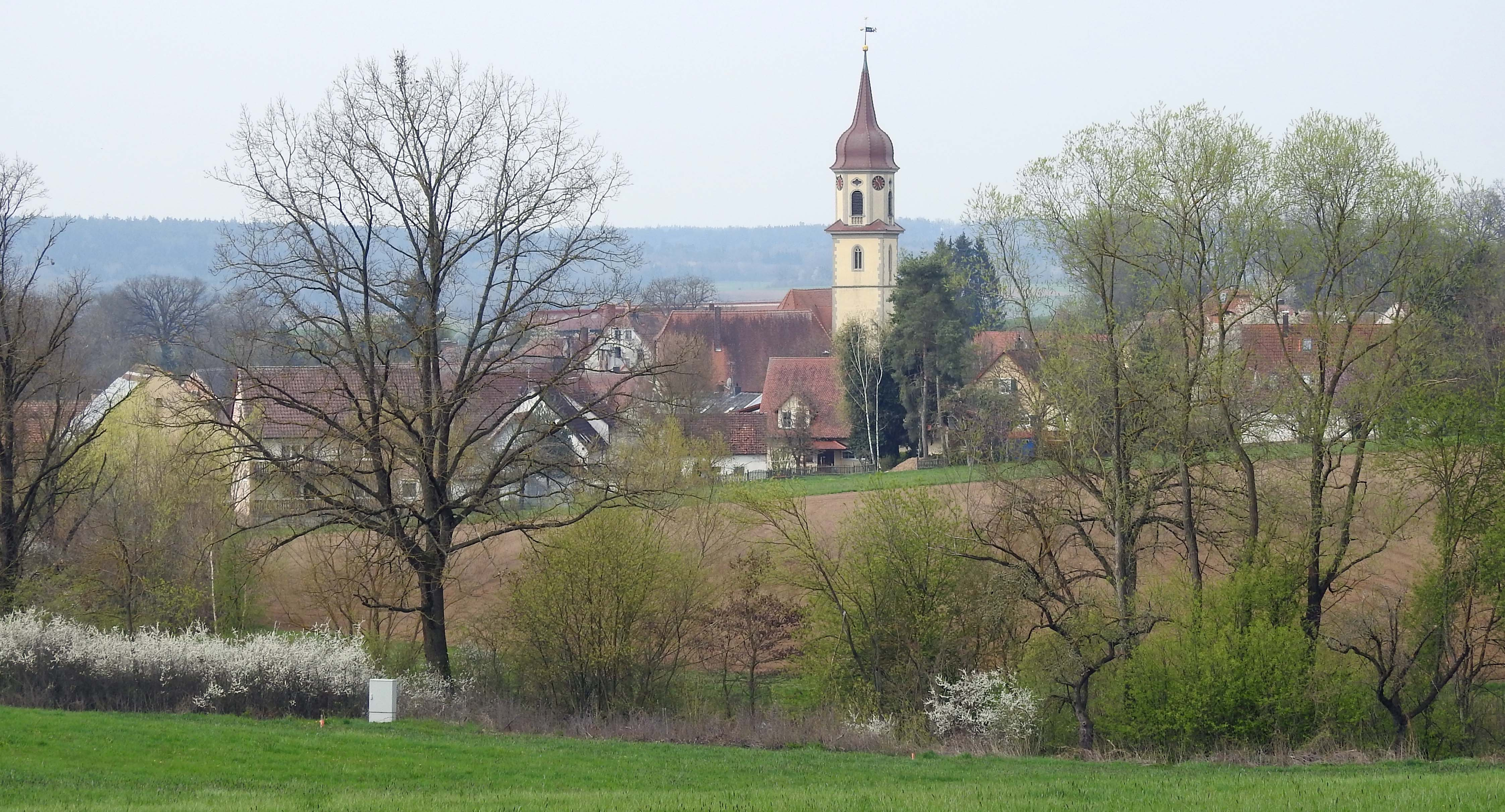
- Röckingen seen from the northeast

- Coat of arms

- Location of Röckingen within Ansbach district
- Interactive map of Röckingen
- Location within Germany Location within Bavaria
- Coordinates: 49°3′N 10°34′E
- Country: Germany
- State: Bavaria
- Admin. region: Mittelfranken
- District: Ansbach
- Municipal assoc.: Hesselberg
- Subdivisions: 5 Ortsteile

Government
  - Mayor (2020–26): Martin Schachner (FW)

Area
  - Total: 10.91 km^{2} (4.21 sq mi)
- Elevation: 456 m (1,496 ft)

Population (2025-12-31)
  - Total: 771
  - Density: 70.7/km^{2} (183/sq mi)
- Time zone: UTC+01:00 (CET)
  - Summer (DST): UTC+02:00 (CEST)
- Postal codes: 91740
- Dialling codes: 09832
- Vehicle registration: AN
- Website: www.roeckingen.de

Röckingen (German pronunciation: [ˈʁœkɪŋən]; East Franconian: Rägging) is a municipality in the district of Ansbach in Bavaria in Germany.
