= Muhr am See =

Muhr a.See
- Municipality
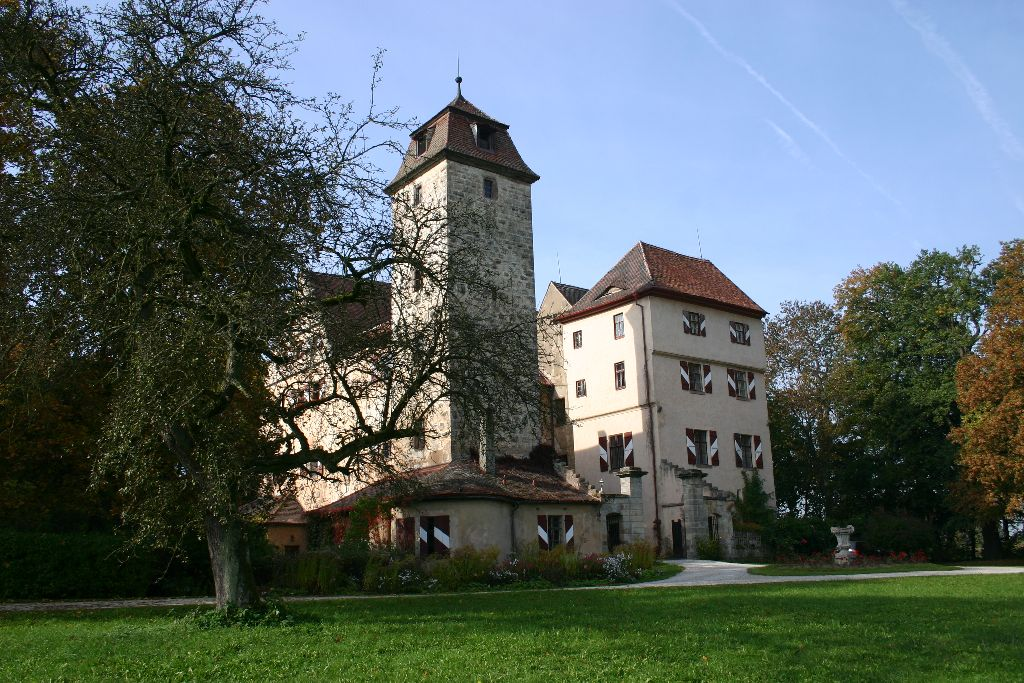
- Altenmuhr Castle

- Coat of arms

- Location of Muhr a.See within Weißenburg-Gunzenhausen district
- Interactive map of Muhr a.See
- Location within Germany Location within Bavaria
- Coordinates: 49°09′20″N 10°43′00″E
- Country: Germany
- State: Bavaria
- Admin. region: Mittelfranken
- District: Weißenburg-Gunzenhausen
- Subdivisions: 3 Ortsteile

Government
  - Mayor (2020–26): Dieter Rampe

Area
  - Total: 10.95 km^{2} (4.23 sq mi)
- Elevation: 417 m (1,368 ft)

Population (2025-12-31)
  - Total: 2,425
  - Density: 221.5/km^{2} (573.6/sq mi)
- Time zone: UTC+01:00 (CET)
  - Summer (DST): UTC+02:00 (CEST)
- Postal codes: 91735
- Dialling codes: 09831
- Vehicle registration: WUG

Muhr am See is a municipality in the Weißenburg-Gunzenhausen district, in Bavaria, Germany.
