= Gerolfingen =

- Municipality
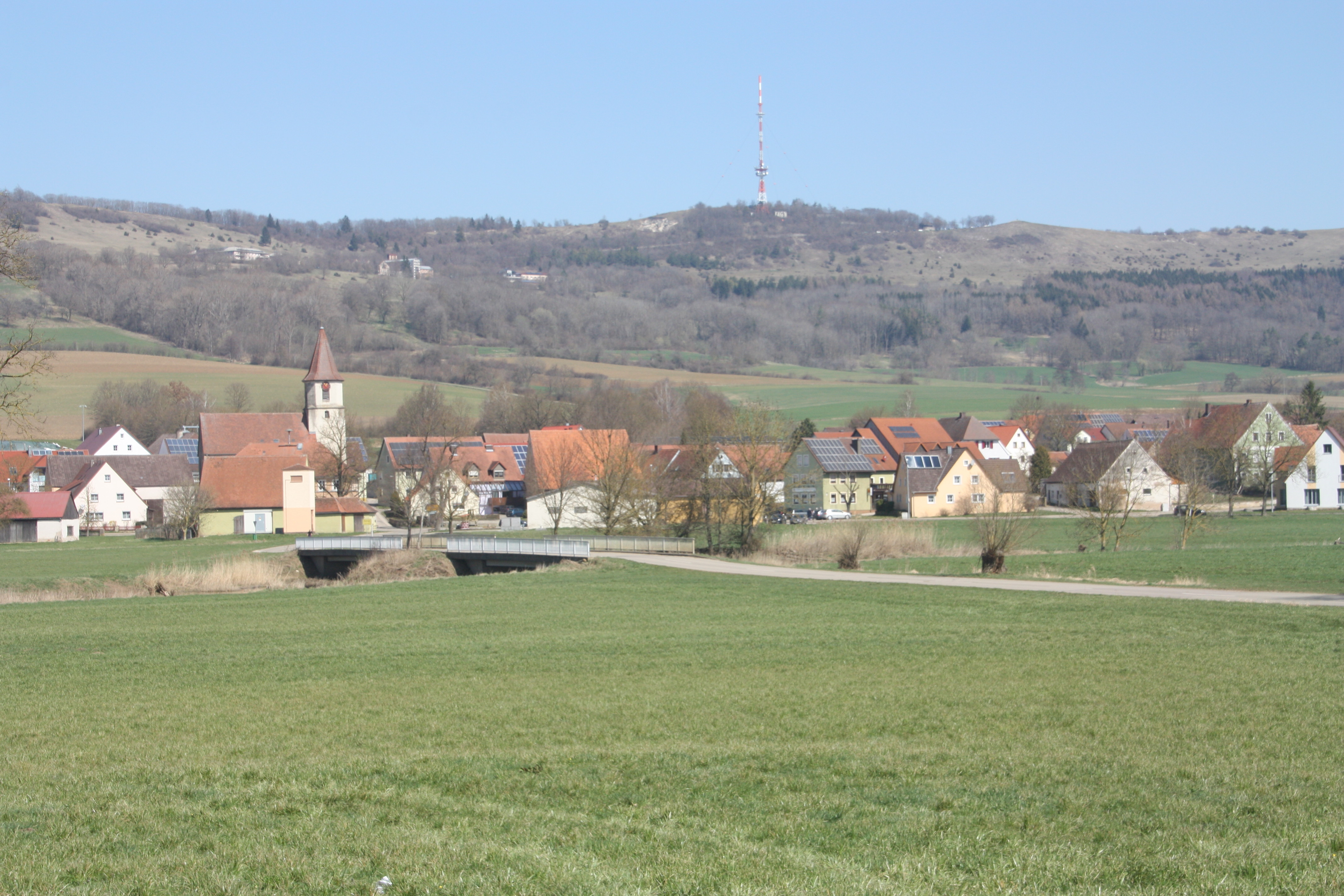
- Gerolfingen

- Coat of arms

- Location of Gerolfingen within Ansbach district
- Interactive map of Gerolfingen
- Location within Germany Location within Bavaria
- Coordinates: 49°3′N 10°31′E
- Country: Germany
- State: Bavaria
- Admin. region: Mittelfranken
- District: Ansbach
- Municipal assoc.: Hesselberg
- Subdivisions: 3 Ortsteile

Government
  - Mayor (2020–26): Karl Fickel

Area
  - Total: 12.59 km^{2} (4.86 sq mi)
- Elevation: 430 m (1,410 ft)

Population (2025-12-31)
  - Total: 937
  - Density: 74.4/km^{2} (193/sq mi)
- Time zone: UTC+01:00 (CET)
  - Summer (DST): UTC+02:00 (CEST)
- Postal codes: 91726
- Dialling codes: 09854
- Vehicle registration: AN
- Website: www.gerolfingen.de

Gerolfingen (German pronunciation: [ˈɡeːʁɔlfɪŋən]; East Franconian: Gerlfing) is a municipality in the district of Ansbach in Bavaria in Germany.
