= Feuchtwangen =

- Town
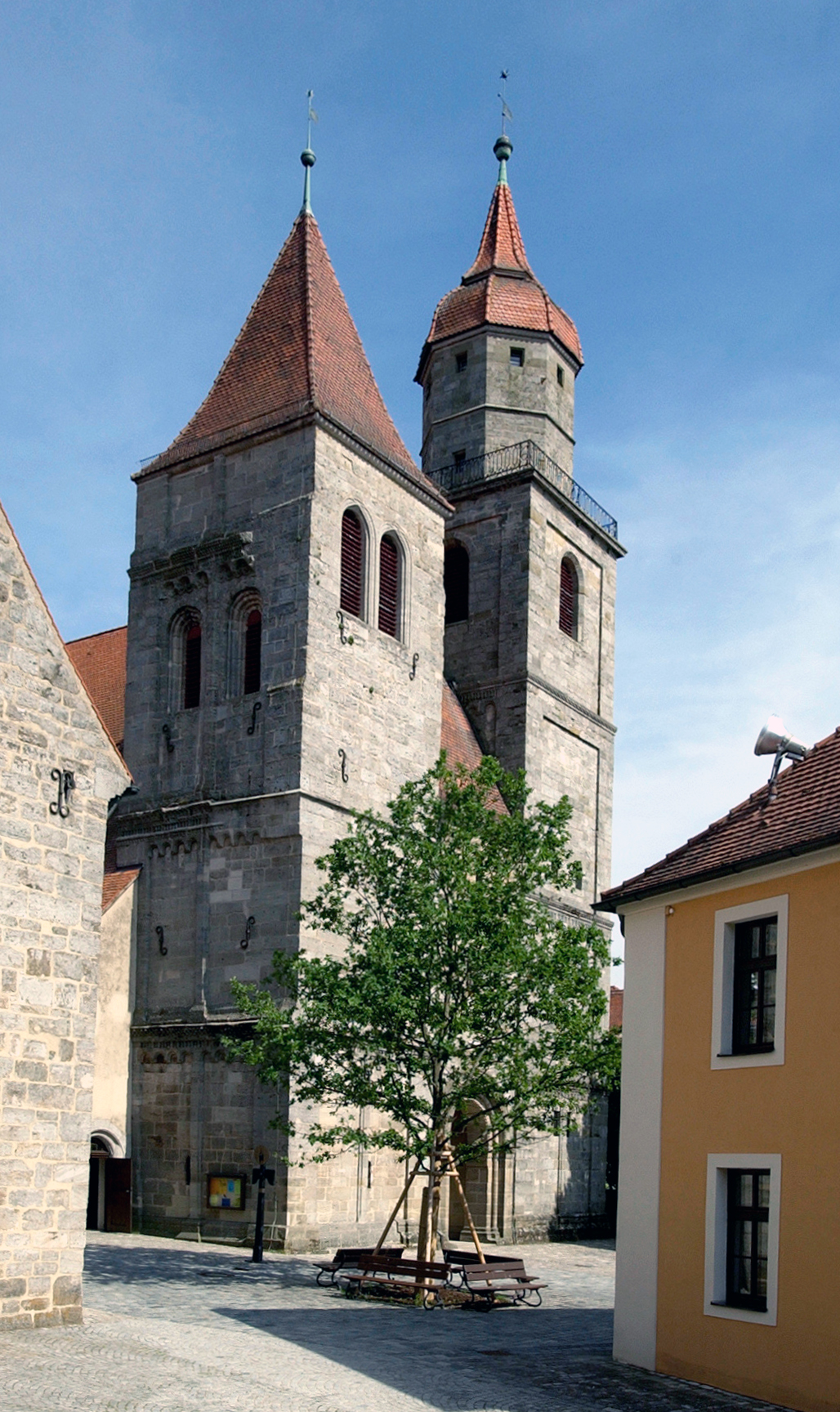
- Stiftskirche in Feuchtwangen

- Coat of arms

- Location of Feuchtwangen within Ansbach district
- Interactive map of Feuchtwangen
- Location within Germany Location within Bavaria
- Coordinates: 49°10′N 10°19′E
- Country: Germany
- State: Bavaria
- Admin. region: Mittelfranken
- District: Ansbach
- Subdivisions: 87 Ortsteile

Government
  - Mayor (2020–26): Patrick Ruh (CSU)

Area
  - Total: 137.21 km^{2} (52.98 sq mi)
- Elevation: 452 m (1,483 ft)

Population (2025-12-31)
  - Total: 12,390
  - Density: 90.30/km^{2} (233.9/sq mi)
- Time zone: UTC+01:00 (CET)
  - Summer (DST): UTC+02:00 (CEST)
- Postal codes: 91555
- Dialling codes: 09852
- Vehicle registration: AN, DKB, FEU, ROT
- Website: www.feuchtwangen.de

Feuchtwangen (German pronunciation: [ˈfɔʏçtˌvaŋən]; Mainfränkisch: Feichtwang) is a town in Ansbach district in the administrative region of Middle Franconia in Bavaria, Germany, with around 12,000 residents and an area of 137 km², making it the biggest city in the Ansbach district by population and area. In 2019 Feuchtwangen celebrated its 1,200th jubilee, based on the first mention of its Benedictine monastery.

== Geography ==
Geographically and geologically the land around Feuchtwangen comprises the eastern part of the Swabian-Franconian Escarpment Land (Schichtstufenland), also sometimes called the gypsum-keuper landscape. Characteristic of this landform is the quick change from deep hollows to mostly wooded mountain ranges, which were formed as the result of keuper strata not being well able to withstand erosion. This also meant that streams in the region could carve broad valleys. The city of Feuchtwangen lies in the Sulzach valley. The city's sprawling area also takes in parts of the Wörnitz valley.

=== River ===
Through Feuchtwangen flows the Sulzach, a tributary to the Wörnitz.

=== Neighbouring communities ===
Neighbouring Feuchtwangen are Schnelldorf, Wörnitz, Dombühl, Aurach, Herrieden, Wieseth, Dentlein am Forst, Dürrwangen, Schopfloch, Dinkelsbühl (all in Ansbach district, Bavaria) and Kreßberg (in Schwäbisch Hall district, Baden-Württemberg).

=== Parts of the city ===
Feuchtwangen has 87 divisions within the city, determined by formerly independent communities. Among them are:

Aichau: Aichau, Jakobsmühle, Löschenmühle, Oberahorn, Thürnhofen, Unterahorn

Aichenzell: Aichenzell, Esbach, Hammerschmiede, Herrnschallbach, Höfstetten, Kaltenbronn, Mögersbronn, Sommerau, Überschlagmühle, Walkmühle, Winterhalten, Zehdorf

Banzenweiler: Banzenweiler, Bieberbach, Georgenhof, Jungenhof, Krebshof, Krobshausen, Leiperzell, Oberransbach, Oberrothmühle, Poppenweiler, Unterransbach, Unterrothmühle, Weiler am See

Breitenau: Breitenau, Gehrenberg, Ratzendorf, Sperbersbach, Ungetsheim, Zischendorf, Zumhaus

Dorfgütingen: Archshofen, Bonlanden, Bölhof, Bühl, Dorfgütingen, Dornberg, Krobshäuser Mühle, Neidlingen, Rödenweiler

Heilbronn: Heilbronn, Herbstmühle, Lichtenau, Metzlesberg, Rißmannschallbach, Wüstenweiler, Zumberg

Krapfenau: Bernau, Eschenlach, Hainmühle, Koppenschallbach, Krapfenau, Krapfenau-Mühle, Lotterhof, Oberlottermühle, Schönmühle, St. Ulrich, Unterlottermühle, Volkertsweiler, Wehlmäusel, Weikersdorf

Larrieden: Heiligenkreuz, Larriden, Oberhinterhof, Unterhinterhof

Mosbach: Bergnerzell, Kühnhardt a. Schlegel, Mosbach, Reichenbach, Seiderzell, Tribur

Vorderbreitenthann: Charhof, Charmühle, Glashofen, Hinterbreitenthann, Oberdallersbach, Steinbach, Tauberschallbach, Unterdallersbach, Voderbreitenthann, Wolfsmühle

== History ==
Feuchtwangen's origins can be traced back to the Benedictine monastery, which was mentioned in a document in 818 or 819 as being "fairly well off". The state of affairs at the monastery was described in 16 letters by the learned monk Froumund and the abbot Wigo in the years 991 to 995. By no later than 1197, however, Feuchtwangen had become a house of secular canons (Chorherrenstift). The canons were not monks and lived in their own houses, but said their canonical prayers together at the monastery church.

Besides the monastery, there was already, since the earliest times, a village. With the help of Emperor Frederick Barbarossa came the establishment of a town sometime between 1150 and 1178. In 1241, Feuchtwangen became an imperial free city. From that time forth, Feuchtwangen consisted of two independent communities: the free city south of the line along Untere Torstraße ("Lower Gate Street") and Postgasse, and the monastery lands to the north. Together with other imperial free cities like Rothenburg ob der Tauber or Dinkelsbühl, the town tried to assert its interests to the princes through the Swabian League (founded in 1376 by 14 free cities). Feuchtwangen had become wealthy owing to its fortunate location on travel routes, and was many times given in pledge by the kings. In the end, in 1376, both the town and the monastery were pledged, or transferred, to the Burgravate of Nuremberg, which later became the Margravate of Brandenburg-Ansbach. The townsfolk could no longer buy their town's freedom, thus leading to a relatively early end to Feuchtwangen's status as an imperial free city.

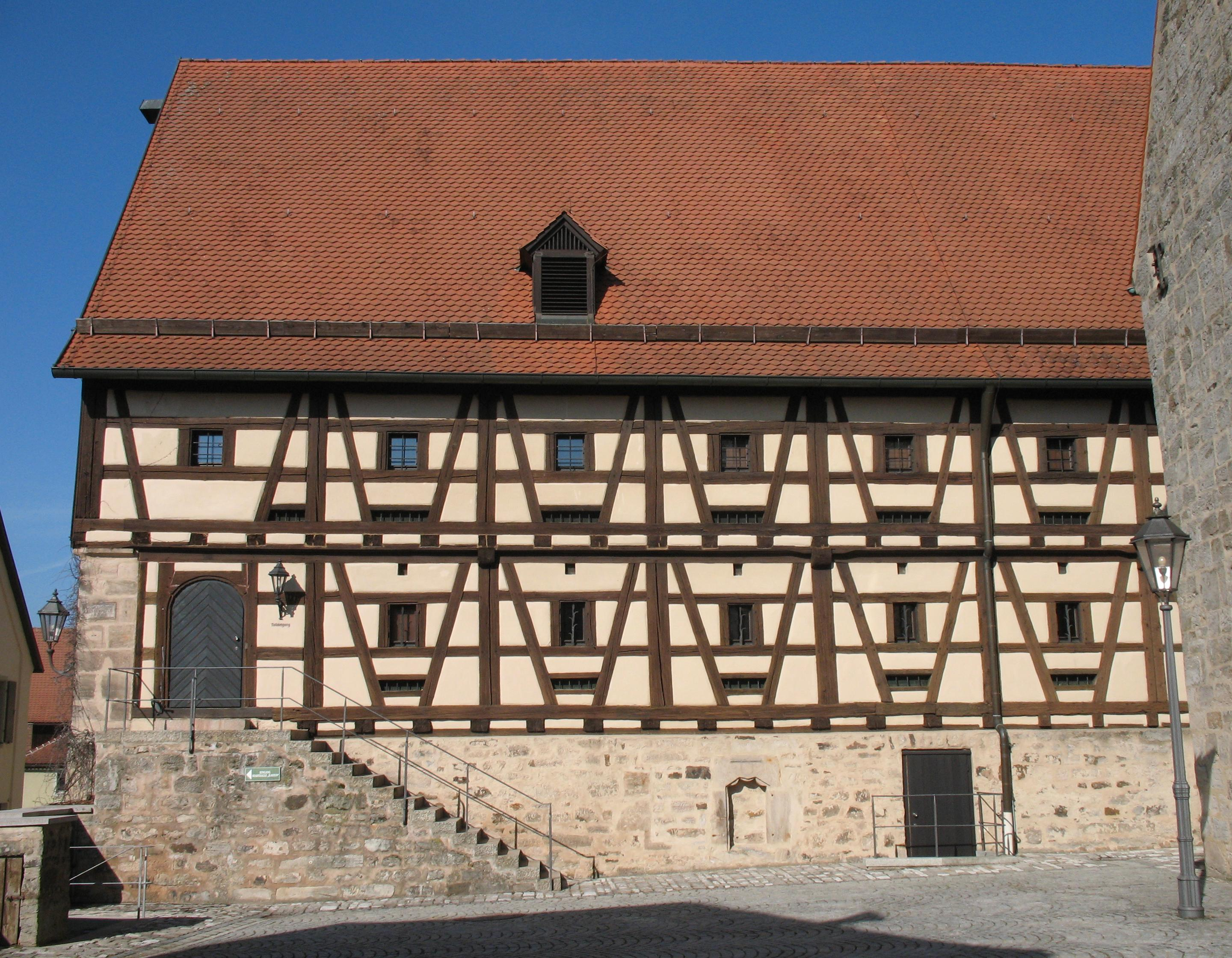
Feuchtwangen Kasten now municipal hall

About 1400, after the city was destroyed in 1388 by the Swabian League, both parts of Feuchtwangen were surrounded by a common wall, which helped to meld the two formerly separate communities into one. The margravate town, seat of a higher administrative office and place of many markets grew in importance and in the 15th and 16th centuries blossomed once again. The troubles in the German Peasants' War afforded an opportunity to introduce the Protestant Reformation, which happened throughout the margravate in 1533. The monastery was confiscated in 1563, with its possessions going to the margrave.

The Thirty Years' War brought woe and hardship to Feuchtwangen, especially with the plundering of the city wrought by Tilly's unruly men. In 1632 and 1634, Swedish and Imperial forces took away what was left, and so it went on for decades before the town and its surrounding area recovered.

In 1555, following a pogrom, the city expelled all its Jewish residents. Some of the expellees settled in Fürth, where they were called the "Feuchtwangers". This has survived as a surname until this day.

Until 1791, Feuchtwangen remained an administrative town of Brandenburg-Ansbach. The last Margrave, who was childless, ceded his land to the Kingdom of Prussia. Only 14 years later, the French briefly took over control of the city, losing it once more only a year later, in 1806, to the Kingdom of Bavaria. Feuchtwangen became the seat of a regional court set up by the regional office and the local court.

In the long era of peace in the 19th century, the city's face was changed. The lower gate tower, along with great parts of the city defences, was demolished. The Spitaltor burnt down in 1811. The city was connected by a railway branchline to the Nuremberg-Stuttgart mainline. Nevertheless, development stagnated in the 19th and 20th centuries until the Second World War. Although some of the communities that were later incorporated into Feuchtwangen were destroyed in the world wars, Feuchtwangen itself was left unscathed.

A renewed upswing took root after the Second World War, spurred on by the arrival of people driven out of their lands in the east. Feuchtwangen became a Bundeswehr garrison town. The town did lose its status as an administrative centre, but won itself a place among the ten largest cities in Bavaria (by land area) once Bavarian municipal reform had amalgamated ten other communities with it. The barracks were closed in 1997, but the lands came into use again only two years later when the Bavarian Building Academy (Bayerische Bauakademie) came to town to establish a continuing education institution. In 2000, the Feuchtwangen Casino opened, which in 2005 was once again the most visited and highest earning of all Bavarian casinos.

=== Worship ===
- 68.3% Evangelical
- 20.0% Catholic
- 11.7% other

=== Amalgamations ===
In 1972, ten communities were amalgamated into Feuchtwangen: Aichau mit Thürnhofen, Aichenzell, Banzenweiler, Breitenau, Dorfgütingen, Heilbronn, Krapfenau, Larrieden, Mosbach and Vorderbreitenthann.

== Politics ==
=== Coat of arms ===
The spruce tree coat of arms was originally the city's second arms. Since 1819, however, it has been the only arms.

=== City partnerships ===
The city maintains partnerships with:

- Lana, South Tyrol, Italy
- Morhange, Lorraine, France
- Næstved, Denmark

== Economy and infrastructure ==
=== Transport ===
==== Roads ====
Feuchtwangen lies on Bundesstraße (Federal Highway) B 25, as well as on the A 6 und A 7 Autobahnen.

==== Railways ====
Feuchtwangen lies on the railway line running between Nördlingen and Dombühl, which was opened in sections from 1876 to 1881, and on which there has been no regular passenger service since 1985. The Bavarian Railway Museum (Bayerisches Eisenbahnmuseum) runs museum trains, including ones from Feuchtwangen as of 2006.

=== Healthcare ===
Feuchtwangen has a hospital with 80 beds. Since 1 January 2003, this has belonged to the Ansbach District Network Clinic, which is made up of hospitals in Rothenburg and Dinkelsbühl. The hospital in Feuchtwangen has the rheumatology and internal medicine departments. There are also a nursing home and many pharmacies in town.

=== Companies ===
Within Feuchtwangen's industrial area, many firms, some quite large, have offices. The following companies can be found in Feuchtwangen:

- Rehau AG & Co
- VP (Vereinigte Papierwarenfabriken GmbH)
- Ernst Hähnlein Bau-GmbH
- Fa. Arcon GmbH
- Preform GmbH
- Weltron Elektronik GmbH
- Bohnacker GmbH Umformtechnik
- handik beauty & sports products e.K.
- Fa. Greisel GmbH

=== Educational institutions ===
==== Kindergartens ====
Feuchtwang has 6 Kindergartens at its disposal, found throughout the city.

===== Church kindergartens =====
Evangelical kindergarten, Sandweg 7 Evangelical kindergarten Wannenbad, Lauerhecke 4 Evangelical kindergarten, Wohlgemutstr. 10 Catholic kindergarten, Am Schwalbennest 2

===== Municipal kindergartens =====
Breitenau Breitenau 4, Mosbach Mosbach 51

==== Schools ====
Two primary schools:

- Grund- und Mittelschule Feuchtwangen-Stadt
- Grund- und Mittelschule Feuchtwangen-Land

Two Hauptschulen:

- Grund- und Mittelschule Feuchtwangen-Stadt
- Grund- und Mittelschule Feuchtwangen-Land

One special preschool:

- Evangelisch- Lutherisches Diakoniewerk Neuendettelsau KdöR

One Realschule:

- Johann-Georg-von Soldner-Schule

One Gymnasium:

- Gymnasium Feuchtwangen

For further education, there is the possibility, through a bus link, of going to the Fachoberschule/Berufsoberschule (technical or professional college) in Ansbach.

== Culture and sightseeing ==
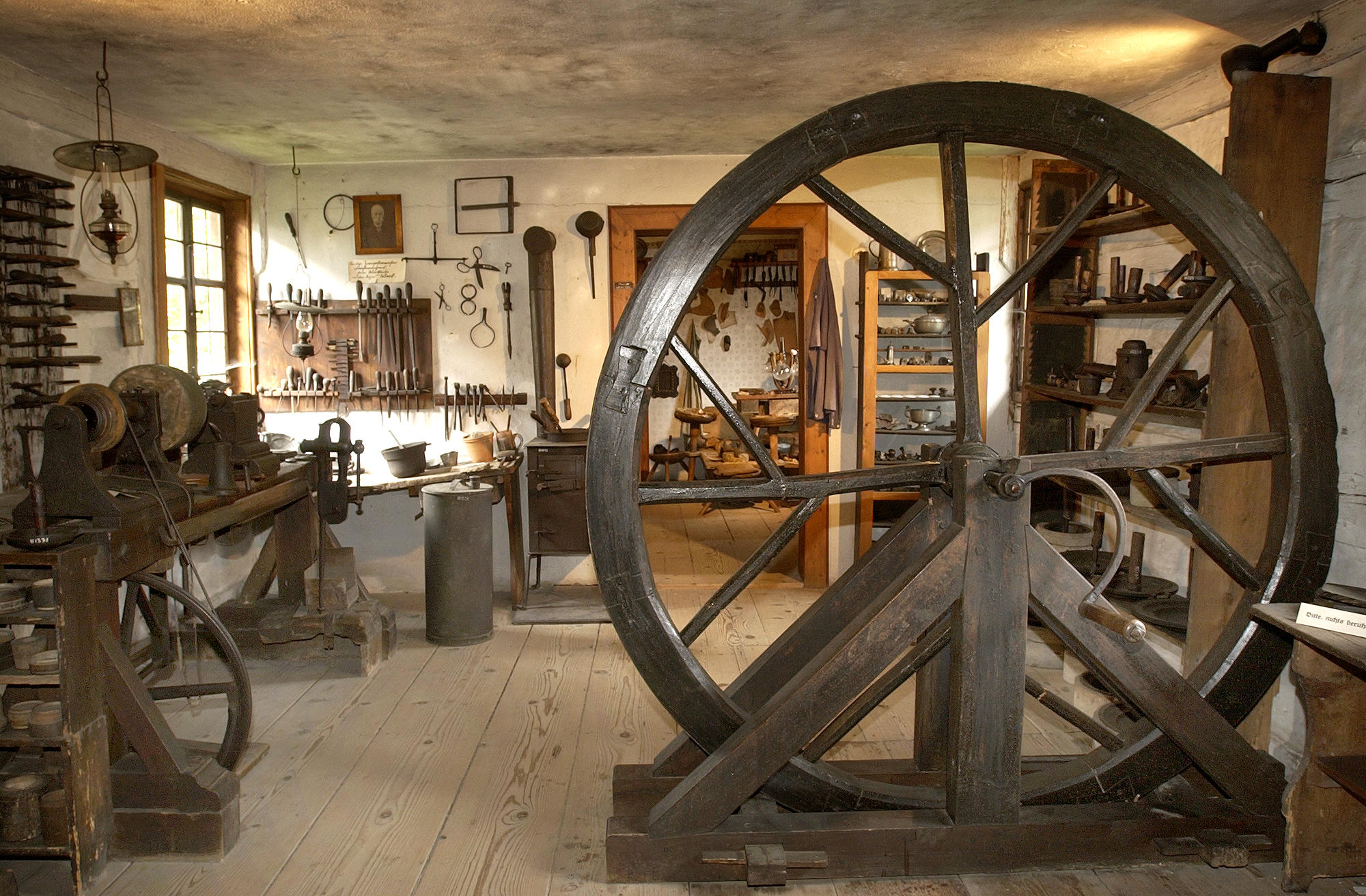
Craftsman's workshop in Feuchtwangen

=== Museums ===
- Fränkisches Museum Feuchtwangen (Franconian Museum)
- Sängermuseum des Deutschen Sängerbundes (Museum dedicated to singers of the German Singers' League)
- Craftsmen's workshops in the Romanesque cloister (see photo)

=== Regular events ===
- The Historic Town Festival (Altstadtfest) is held every year at the Feuchtwangen market place.
- Every year from mid-June to mid-August, the Kreuzgangspiele Feuchtwangen ("Cloister theatre festival Feuchtwangen") play professional openair theatre with a broad range of pieces by classical and modern playwrights.
- Late in September, the Mooswiese (literally "moss meadow") takes place at the Mooswiesenfestplatz.

=== Sights ===
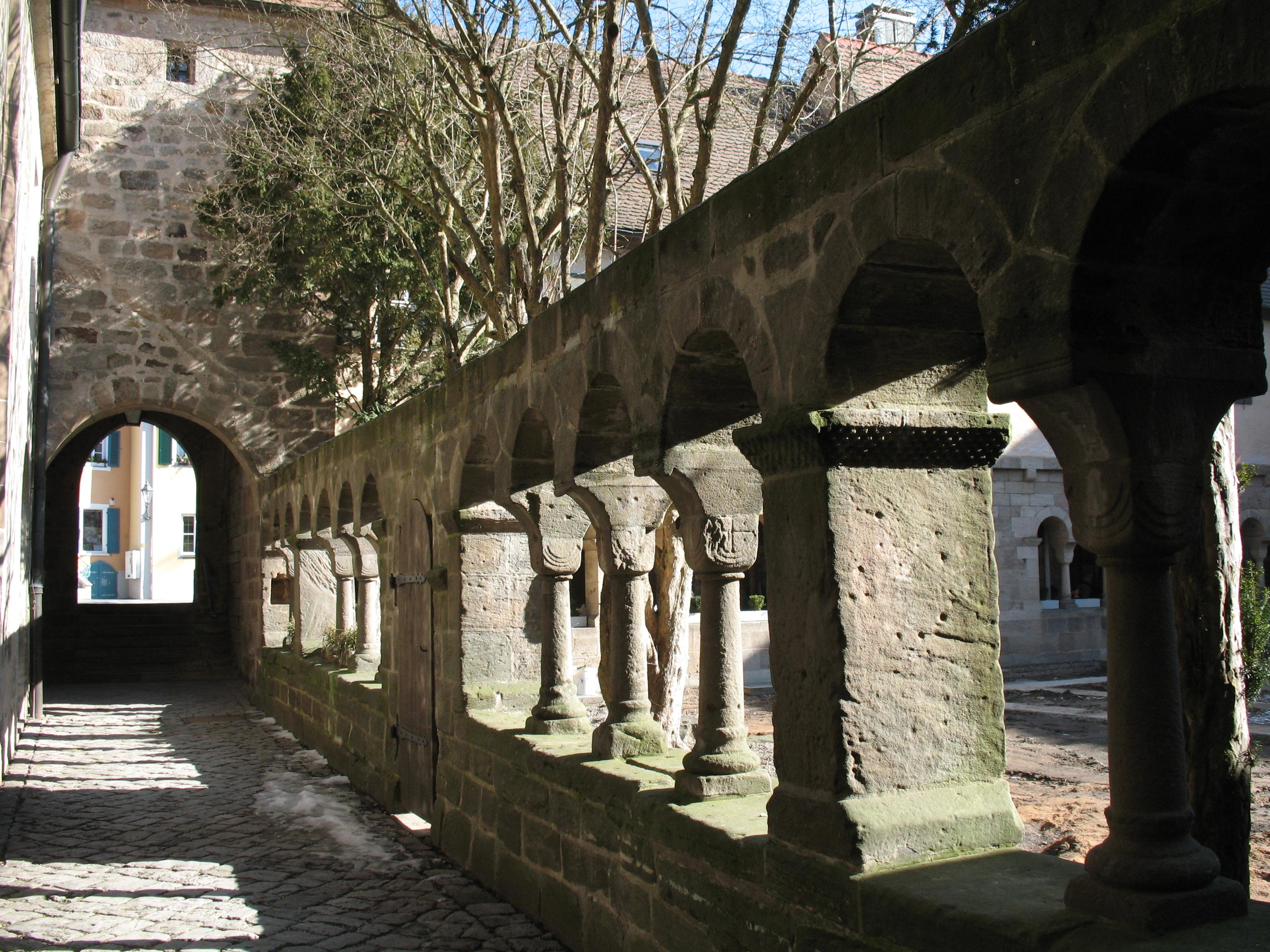
Romanesque cloister

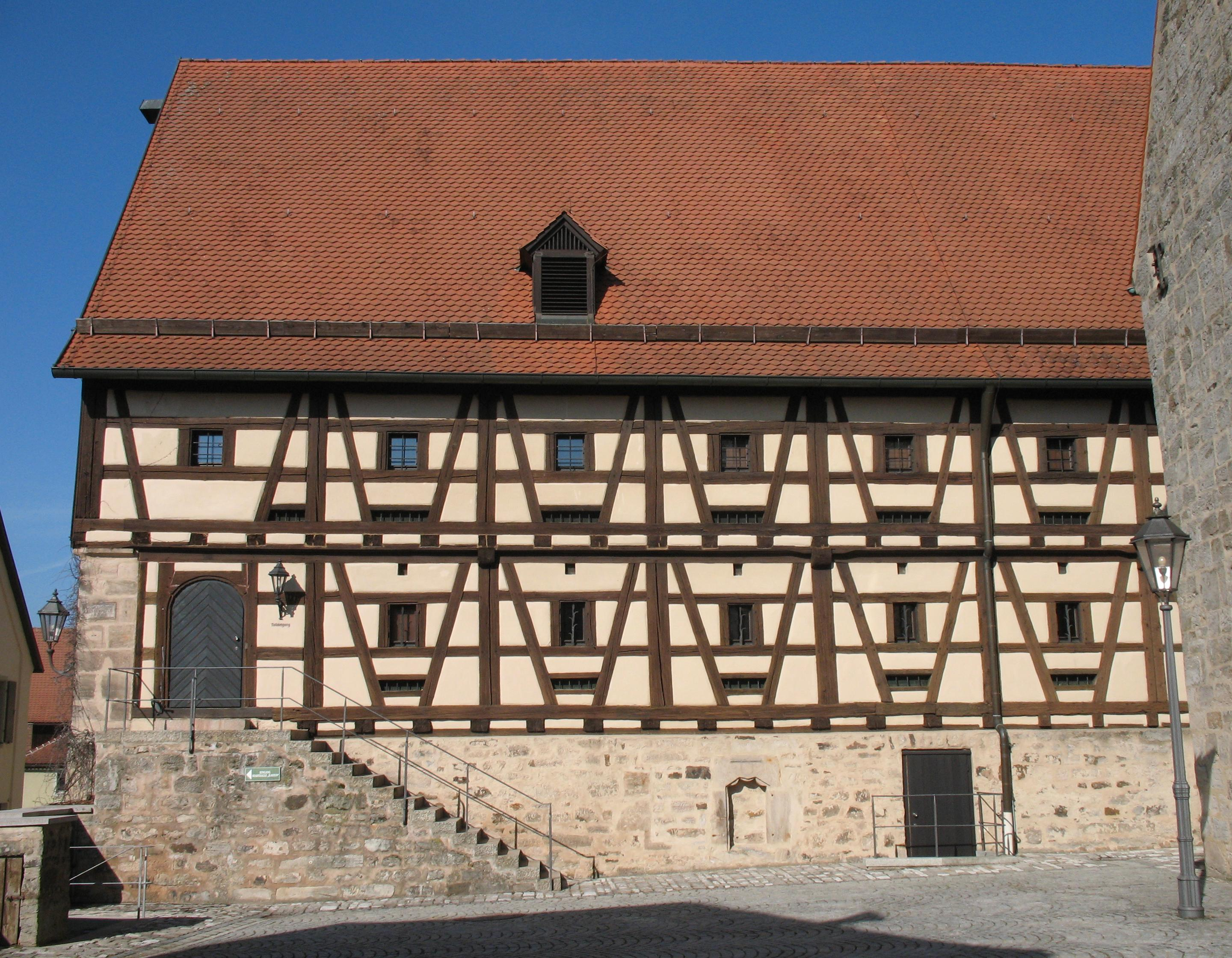
Former barn, now guildhall „Kasten“

Worth seeing is the historic old town with its marketplace that the Handbuch der Deutschen Kunstdenkmäler (Handbook of German Artistic Memorials), published originally by Georg Dehio, described as "Franconia's ballroom". Also worthy of note is the former Benedictine monastery church with its Romanesque cloister, in which the craftsmen's workshops are housed. Also, a fair amount of the town's old wall still stands, dating from about 1400. Of the town's original three gates, only one, the Upper Gate, is still maintained. The Lower Gate had to make way for traffic in the 19th century, and the Spitaltor, or Hospital Gate, fell down after a fire. The following sights are also to be seen in Feuchtwangen:

- The Röhrenbrunnen fountain with a statue of Minerva, the Protectress of Commerce.
- The cloister, assumed to date from the second half of the 12th century.
- The craftsmen's workshops, housed in the cloister.
- The monastery church, which formerly actually served as such.
- The Johanneskirche, former parish church, now a baptistery.
- The little gallery, in which changing exhibitions from a great variety of amateur artists are seen.
- The Upper Gate, the only one still standing of the original three.
- The half-timbered building that was originally Peter's and Paul's Chapel, later a barn for the taxes from the former monastery's goods, and since 1982, the city hall.
- The Taubenbrünnlein ("Little Dove Fountain") in which the legend about the city's founding is immortalized.
- The Cereal Market, where a collection of old firefighting equipment may be seen.
- The Franconian Museum, one of southern Germany's finest folk art museums.
- The Singers' Museum (Sängermuseum), Germany's only choral museum.

== Notable residents ==
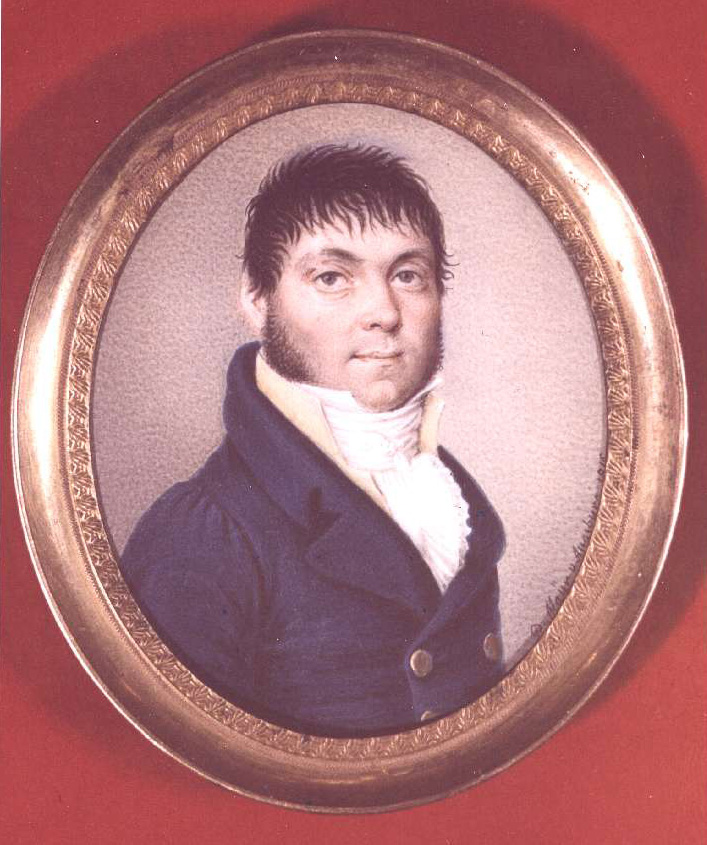
Johann Georg Soldner 1816

- Monk Froumund and Abbot Wigo (16 letters from the Benedictine Monastery 991 - 995)
- Walther von der Vogelweide (ca. 1170-ca. 1230), medieval lyric poet (origin disputed)
- Konrad von Feuchtwangen, 13th century Grand Master of the Teutonic Knights
- Siegfried von Feuchtwangen, 14th century Grand Master of the Teutonic Knights
- Andreas von Gundelsheimer (1668-1715), physicians, botanists and researchers Louis XIV and personal physician of King 'Friedrich I.' 'And' 'Frederick William . I'
- Johann Georg von Soldner (1776-1833), surveyor and astronomer
- Adalbert Schnizlein (1814-1868), botanist
- Feuchtwanger, German-Jewish surname of families originating from the city, which, following a pogrom in 1555, expelled all its Jewish residents.
  - Lion Feuchtwanger (1884–1958), novelist
- Klaus Schmidt (1953–2014), influential archaeologist leading excavations at Göbekli Tepe, Turkey
- Martin Stümpfig (born 1970), member of the Bavarian parliament
- Christiane Karg (born 1980), soprano
- Cornelia Dumler (born 1982), volleyball player for the German national team
