= Wittelshofen =

- Municipality
- Coat of arms

- Location of Wittelshofen within Ansbach district
- Interactive map of Wittelshofen
- Location within Germany Location within Bavaria
- Coordinates: 49°4′N 10°28′E
- Country: Germany
- State: Bavaria
- Admin. region: Mittelfranken
- District: Ansbach
- Municipal assoc.: Hesselberg
- Subdivisions: 10 Ortsteile

Government
  - Mayor (2020–26): Werner Leibrich

Area
  - Total: 24.23 km^{2} (9.36 sq mi)
- Elevation: 434 m (1,424 ft)

Population (2025-12-31)
  - Total: 1,234
  - Density: 50.93/km^{2} (131.9/sq mi)
- Time zone: UTC+01:00 (CET)
  - Summer (DST): UTC+02:00 (CEST)
- Postal codes: 91749
- Dialling codes: 09854
- Vehicle registration: AN
- Website: www.wittelshofen.de

Wittelshofen is a municipality in the district of Ansbach in Bavaria in Germany.

== Geography ==
The municipality is located near the delta of the Sulzach into the Wörnitz at the foot of the Hesselberg mountains. The municipality is divided into the following parts:

- Wittelshofen
- Grüb
- Dühren
- Gelshofen
- Illenschwang
- Neumühle
- Obermichelbach
- Untermichelbach

The neighbour municipalities are (starting in the north clockwise):

- Langfurth
- Ehingen
- Gerolfingen
- Weiltingen
- Wilburgstetten
- Dinkelsbühl

== History ==
The place is mentioned for the first time in 1274 as Witelshoven.

== Coat of arms ==
The coat of arms of Wittelshofen shows a lily on a blue background. Over it is a black-silver quartering. The lily was the coat of arms symbol of Gumbert in Ansbach. The blue background in represents the confluence of the Sulzach and the Wörnitz.

== Religious denominations ==
=== Jewish municipality ===
In 1716, there were already 30 Jewish families in Wittelshofen. The Jewish population reached its peak about 1809/10 with 282 persons. Afterwards the number went throughout and drift constantly back (1910 42, 1933 17 Jewish inhabitants). At least 18 Jews from Wittelshofen were killed in concentration camps between 1941 and 1945.

== Museums ==
- Roman park Ruffenhofen
- Local history museum Heinrich Zoller

== Buildings ==
In the old centre of Wittelshofen stands the Martinskirche. At the edge of the settlement area, which is because of the mountain-slope, kath. the holy cross church stands. Illenschwang with its former military church, Obermichelbach with its Michaelskirche and Untermichelbach with its pc. Leonard geweihten church invite to staying. A Kleinod is the Dühren lying in a pictorial side valley of the Sulzach. Its pc. Michaelskirchlein saves Fresken from that 14th and 15th centuries, which only 1985 were discovered and partly opened.
