= Thie =

Thie is a surname. Notable people with the surname include:

- James Thie (born 1978), Welsh middle-distance runner
- Ton Thie (1944–2021), Dutch footballer

== See also ==
- Thiel (surname)
- Thiem
- Thies (name)
