= St. John's Church, Leukershausen =

Historic Lutheran church in Germany

Coordinates: 49°09′50″N 10°11′12″E

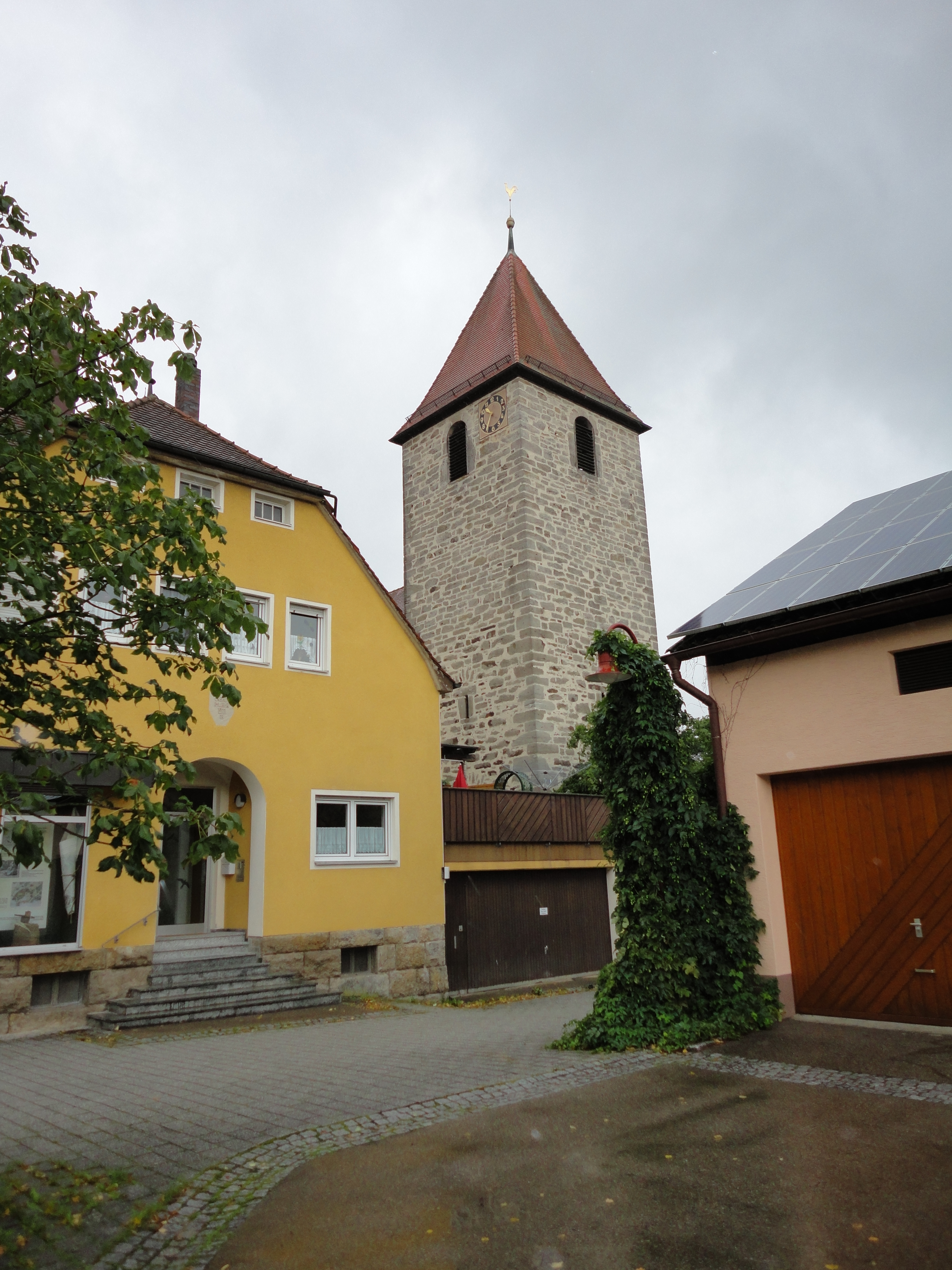
Tower of the Johanneskirche

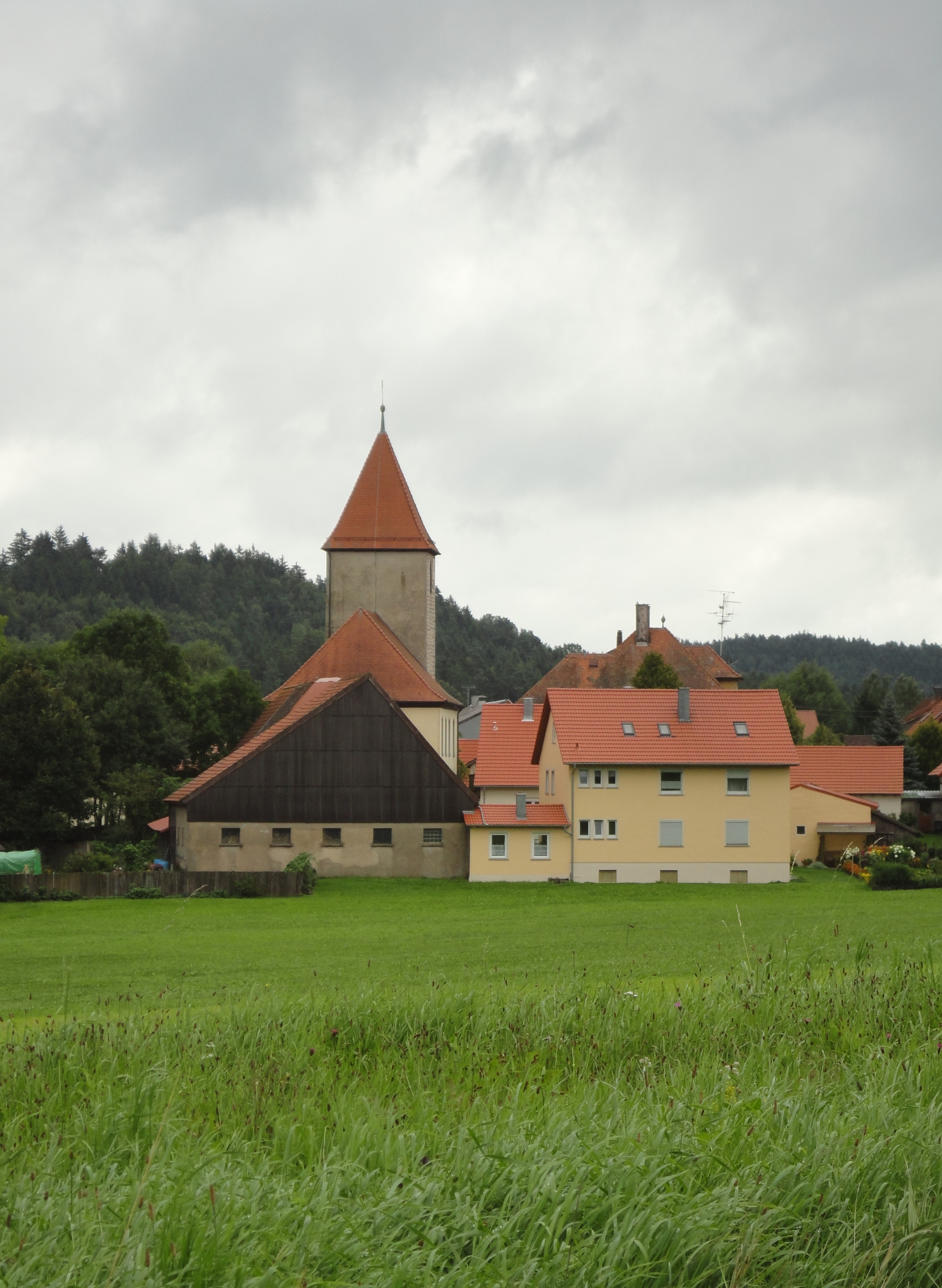
Johanneskirche, looking eastward

St. John's Church (German: Johanneskirche) is a historic Lutheran church in the village of Leukershausen, Schwäbisch Hall in Baden-Württemberg, Germany.

== History ==
The church is named for St. John the Evangelist. The earliest reference to worship in Leukershausen occurs between the years 1279–85, when the presence of a priest was first documented. From 1368 to 1856, the church was under the patronage of the Hospital of the Holy Spirit (German: Spitalanlage) in Dinkelsbühl.

== Architecture ==
Exterior

The church consists of a gothic style choirtower from the 15th century at its eastern end, with a classical style nave from the 18th century at its western end. Originally, the upper portion of the tower employed half-timbered construction, but was rebuilt with stone in 1830 due to severe structural deterioration. The southern face of the choirtower features a mechanical clock, that was added in the 20th century. In terms of materials, the building is constructed of solid masonry with uncoursed random rubble walls. The stone of the tower is exposed, while the nave is finished with a parge coat. The tower has a pyramidal hipped roof topped with a rooster shaped weather vane, while the nave has a combination of gable and hipped roofs, all with squared terra cotta tiles.
