= Schopfloch, Bavaria =

Schopfloch
- Municipality
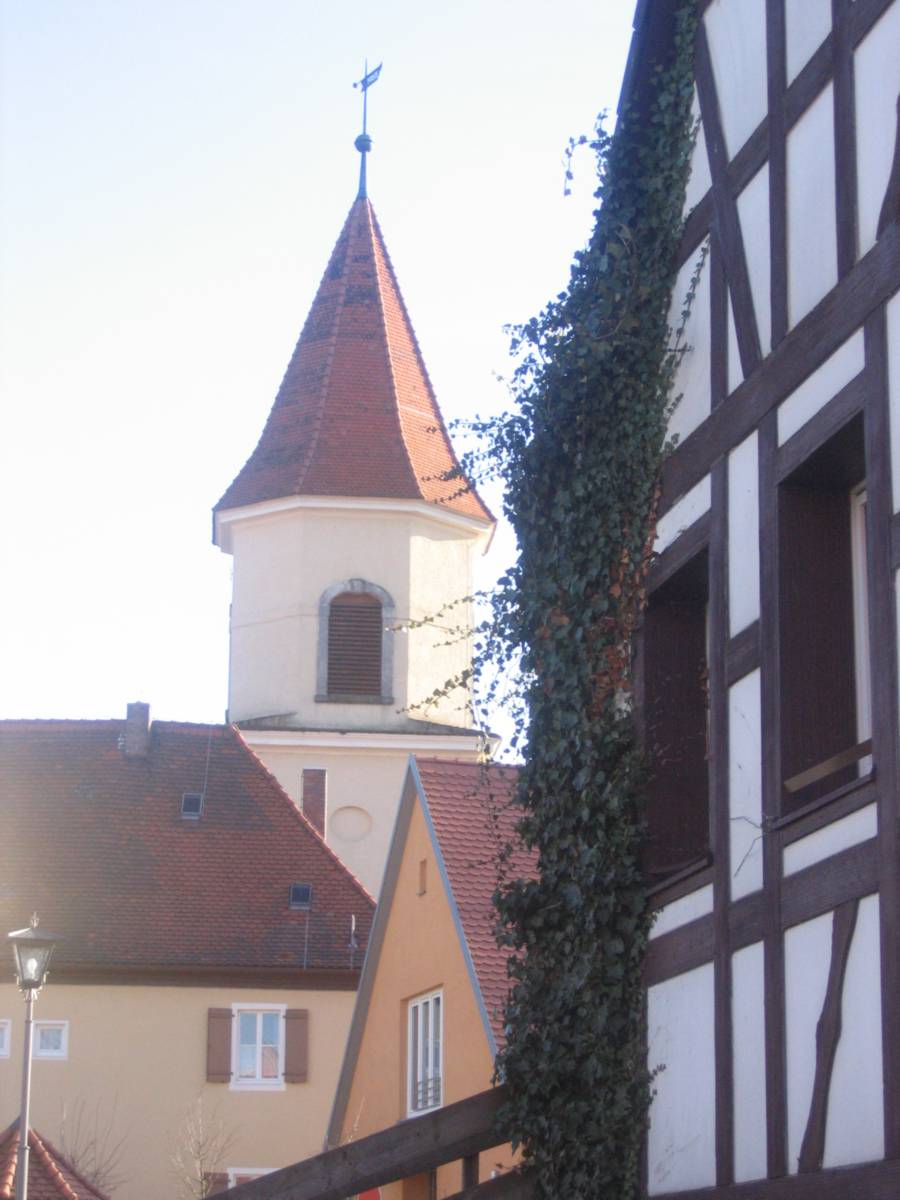
- Village center with St. Martin Church and community center from the southwest

- Coat of arms

- Location of Schopfloch within Ansbach district
- Interactive map of Schopfloch
- Location within Germany Location within Bavaria
- Coordinates: 49°07′18″N 10°18′17″E
- Country: Germany
- State: Bavaria
- Admin. region: Mittelfranken
- District: Ansbach
- Subdivisions: 8 Ortsteile

Government
  - Mayor (2020–26): Oswald Czech

Area
  - Total: 15.34 km^{2} (5.92 sq mi)
- Elevation: 484 m (1,588 ft)

Population (2025-12-31)
  - Total: 2,929
  - Density: 190.9/km^{2} (494.5/sq mi)
- Time zone: UTC+01:00 (CET)
  - Summer (DST): UTC+02:00 (CEST)
- Postal codes: 91626
- Dialling codes: 09857
- Vehicle registration: AN

Schopfloch (German pronunciation: [ˈʃɔpflɔx]) is a municipality in the district of Ansbach in Bavaria in Germany. It was the home of Lachoudisch, a rare Hebrew-infused German dialect, before it became extinct in 2022.

== Geography ==
=== Location ===
Schopfloch is located on the Romantic Road between the towns of Feuchtwangen and Dinkelsbühl in a landscape surrounded by meadows and forests on a gently sloping valley slope of the Wörnitz River.

The town is located in western Middle Franconia; it is only a few kilometers from Baden-Württemberg's district of Schwäbisch Hall.

=== Municipal Structure ===
There are 13 municipal districts (the settlement type is indicated in parentheses):

- Buchhof (hamlet)
- Deuenbach (village)
- Dickersbronn (village)
- Franzenmühle (isolated village)
- Köhlau (hamlet)
- Lehenbuch (hamlet)
- Lehengütingen (parish village)
- Neumühle (isolated village)
- Pulvermühle (hamlet)
- Rohrmühle (isolated village)
- Schopfloch (main town)
- Waldhäuslein (village)
- Zwernberg (parish village)

The municipal area includes the districts of Dickersbronn, Lehengütingen, Schopfloch, and Waldhäuslein (district 1). The Schopfloch district has an area of 4,336 km². It is divided into 1,675 parcels of land, each with an average area of 2,588.79 m². In addition to the eponymous village, it includes the municipal districts of Buchhof, Deuenbach, Neumühle and Rohrmühle.

=== Neighboring communities ===
Schopfloch borders the town of Feuchtwangen to the north, the municipality of Dürrwangen to the east, and the major district town of Dinkelsbühl to the south. The borders of Dinkelsbühl and Feuchtwangen meet in the west of Schopfloch.

== History ==
The first written mention of the place can be found in a deed of gift dated March 11, 1260, in which the name "Ulricus de Schopfloch" is mentioned as a witness. Later, the noble family of Schopfloch settled there. The place name is derived from a field name of the same name, whose root word is "lôch" (Middle High German for bushes, forest, woodland) and whose defining word is "schopf" (Middle High German for barn), meaning woodland near a barn.

Only sparse remains of Schopfloch Castle in the village center remain. Documents documenting the village's origins are lacking.

Jurisdiction over Schopfloch was claimed by both the Ansbach Oberamt Feuchtwangen and the Oettingen-Spielberg Oberamt Dürrwangen. The imperial city of Dinkelsbühl wanted to claim it on its estates. The village and parish lordship was disputed between the Feuchtwangen caste office and the Dürrwangen superior office.

In 1732, the village consisted of 77 estates with 88 households. There was also an Ansbach castle with a curtain wall, a church (Protestant), a rectory, a school and sacristan's house and a shepherd's house. The landlords were the bailiwick of Schopfloch, the Oberamt Dürrwangen, the Teutonic Order and the imperial city of Dinkelsbühl.

Towards the end of the 18th century there were 117 properties plus municipal, ecclesiastical and stately buildings. From 1797 to 1808 the town was under the jurisdiction of the Feuchtwangen Justice and Chamber Office.

In 1806, Schopfloch became part of the Kingdom of Bavaria. The municipal edict of 1809 established the tax district and the rural municipality of Schopfloch. The rural municipality was assigned to the Dinkelsbühl district court for administration and jurisdiction and to the Dinkelsbühl rent office for financial administration. The administration was taken over by the newly created Dinkelsbühl district office in 1862. Jurisdiction remained with the Dinkelsbühl district court. In 1964, the municipality had an area of 4.287 km².

In 1965, the village was granted market rights. With the dissolution of the district of Dinkelsbühl in 1972, Schopfloch became part of the district of Ansbach. In March 1979, Schopfloch received approval from the government of Middle Franconia to adopt a coat of arms and to use a flag.

=== Descendants of Austrian Protestants ===
Schopfloch has some special features in terms of social and cultural history: During the Thirty Years' War, Protestants from the Salzburg region settled in Schopfloch in 1634. They brought traditional trades such as bricklaying and stonemasonry with them to their new home. As the immediate vicinity of Schopfloch did not offer enough work in the construction sector, the bricklayers and stonemasons moved from spring to fall, usually in groups of six to eight men, as migrant workers through southern Germany, Switzerland and Austria.

The "acquaintance for what was new in the world, developed through occupational wandering," led to the early adoption of democratic and trade union-social democratic ideas in Schopfloch in the 19th century. The SPD local association, founded in 1897, had about 250 members in January 1932, out of a village population of just under 2,000 at the time. In 1905, Schopfloch was the first municipality in Bavaria to elect a Social Democrat, stonemason Heinrich Grimm, as mayor. After the local association was dissolved in 1933 during the Nazi era, the SPD local association was re-established in December 1945. In the 1946 local elections, the SPD won nine out of ten seats.

=== Jewish community ===
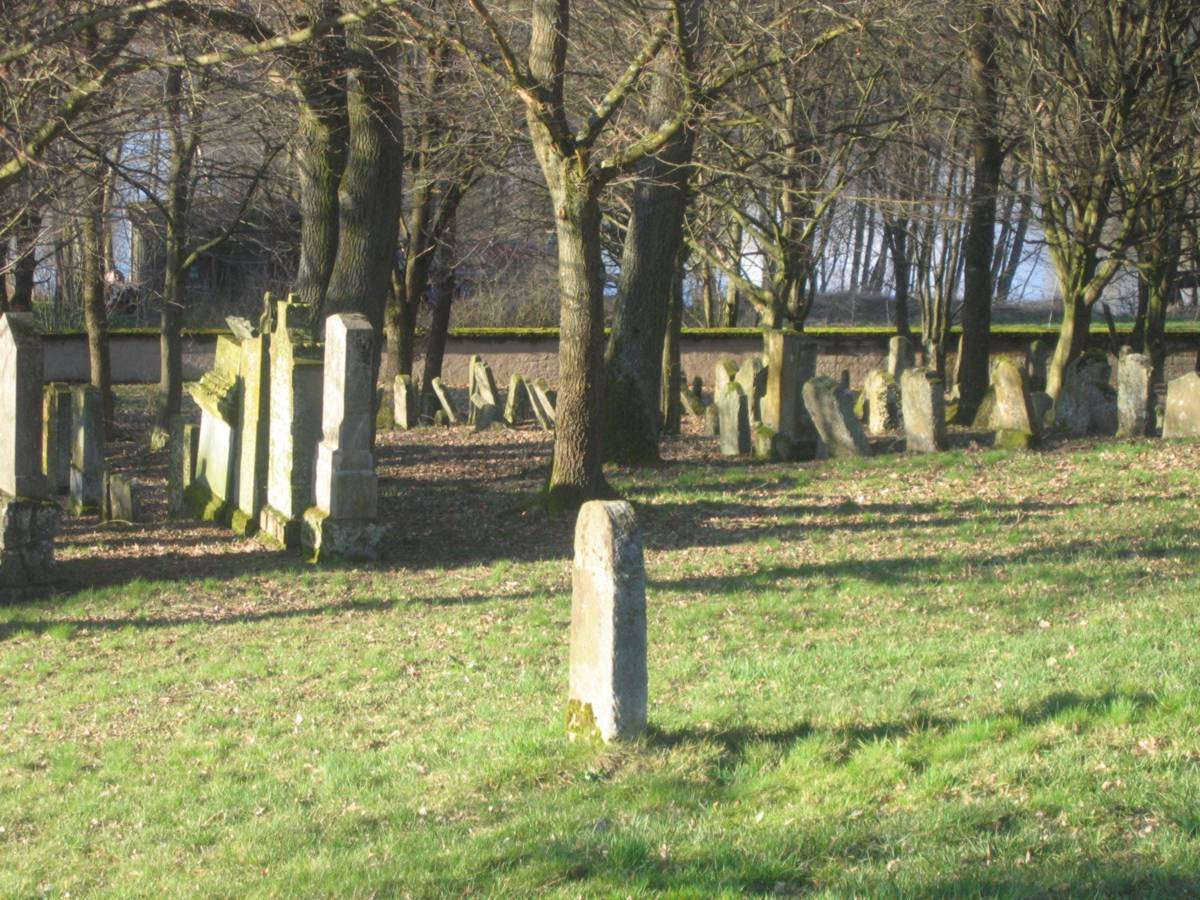
Jewish cemetery, one of the largest in southern Germany

Jewish citizens played a very important role in the social life of Schopfloch. The first Jews settled here in the early 16th century, as documented in the first records from 1561 and 1566. Due to the political situation in the 17th and 18th centuries, which divided Schopfloch into two administrative districts, two Jewish communities emerged in the town, one under the rule of Oettingen-Wallerstein, the other under the rule of the Margraves of Ansbach. Both communities merged into one Jewish community only at the beginning of the 19th century.

The Jewish cemetery was established in 1612 (or even a few years earlier) and has been expanded several times since then, with the last major expansion taking place in 1802. As a community cemetery – until some of them created their own burial grounds – it was the central cemetery for the Jewish communities of a wide region, including Dinkelsbühl, Feuchtwangen, Mönchsroth and Wittelshofen, as well as for several communities now in Baden-Württemberg: in particular, until 1841, Crailsheim, Goldbach, Ingersheim an der Jagst, Hengstfeld, and until 1840, Michelbach an der Lücke, Steinbach, Unterdeufstetten (now a district of Fichtenau), and Wiesenbach (now a district of Blaufelden). The last burials took place in 1938 (Paula Jordan from Wittelshofen and Fanny Benjamin née Dinkelsbühl). The extremely extensive area necessitated repeated expansion, and the cemetery ultimately covers 12,980 m². The oldest gravestones, some of which have sunk into the grounds, are located at the far east of the site. According to more recent counts, there are 1,172 gravestones in the cemetery.

The first synagogue was built in 1679 on the Oettingen side of the town. It was shared by the Jewish community in the Brandenburg-Ansbach part of Schopfloch. It was not until the 19th century that the two Jewish communities merged and came under the jurisdiction of the Schopfloch District Rabbinate under District Rabbi Nathan Ehrlich (1841–1872). In 1830, a Jewish elementary school was established in Schopfloch, which included a mikveh and a teacher's apartment. A new synagogue building was built in 1877. Around 1900, one-third of Schopfloch's citizens were members of the Jewish religious community. At the beginning of the 20th century, however, many local Jews emigrated to America, significantly reducing the number of Jewish residents.

The long peaceful coexistence between Jews and Christians came to an end with the Nazi takeover in 1933. In 1938, the last 18 remaining Jewish citizens of Schopfloch were forced to leave. The synagogue was destroyed during Kristallnacht. A total of 54 Jews from Schopfloch died in various concentration camps. Another visible trace of Jewish life is the house at Bahnhofstraße 8 (Jewish school). A memorial stone, which was placed in front of the building at Bahnhofstraße 5, commemorates the destroyed synagogue. A prominent contemporary witness, Hans Rosenfeld, played a key role in portraying Jewish living conditions in Schopfloch until his death in 2015, through numerous documentaries and lectures.

== Notable people ==
- Justin Rosenfeld (1901 – 1947), film producer and distributor born in Schopfloch
- Friedrich Ammensdörfer (1785–1850), innkeeper and member of Bavarian parliament
- Abraham Schweizer (1875–1942), rabbi
