= Melk Reform =

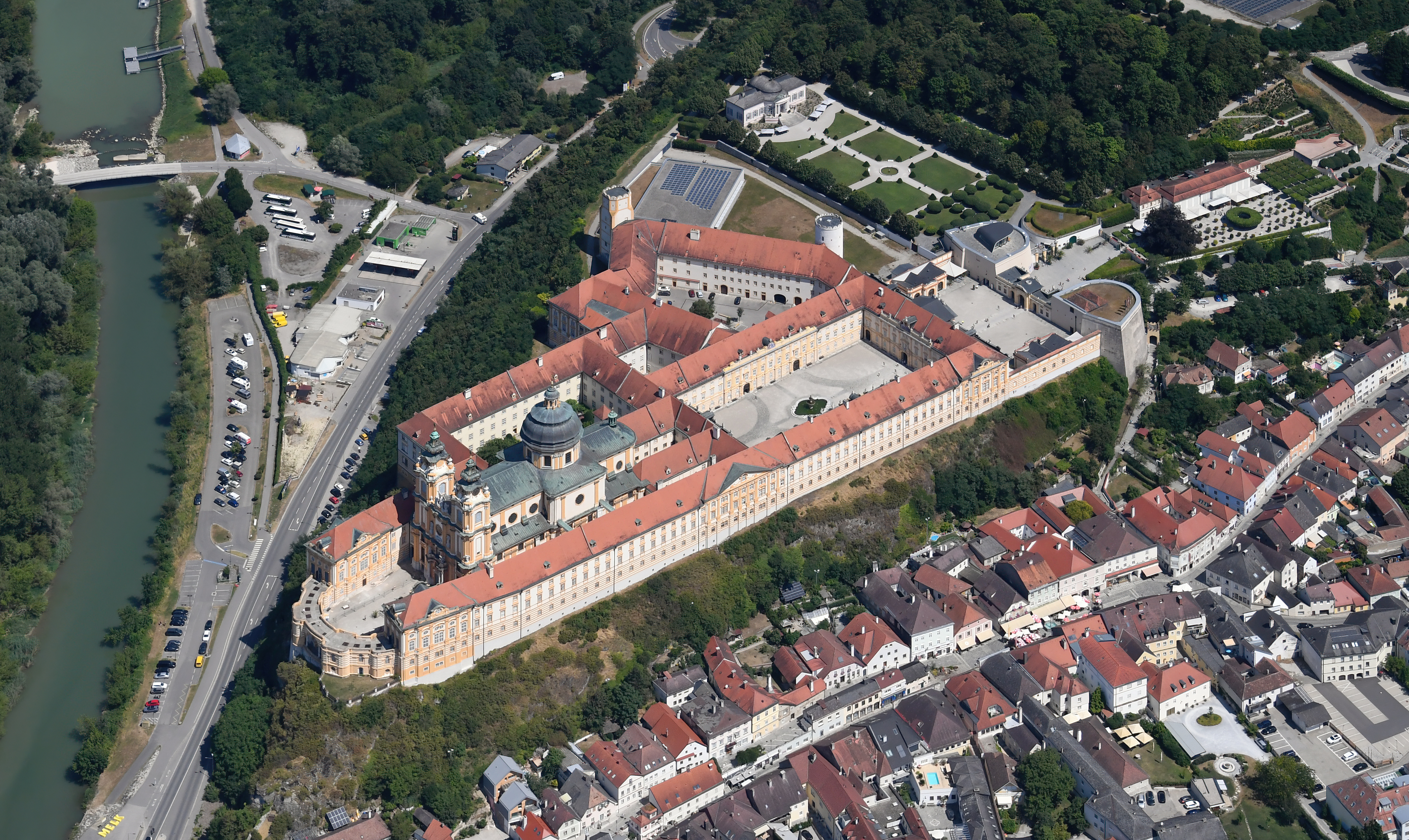
Melk Abbey

The Melk Reform (German: Melker Reform) was a reform of monastic life begun at Melk Abbey in 1418 that spread throughout the Benedictine and Augustinian houses of the Duchy of Austria and other parts of southern Germany following the Council of Constance. It was part of the wider Observant movement.

On 17 January 1418, Pope Martin V, acting upon the request of Duke Albert V of Austria, granted Abbot Angelus Manse of Rein Abbey and Prior Leonhard Petraer of Gaming Charterhouse the right of canonical visitation to all Benedictine and Augustinian foundations in Duke Albert's lands. In June, Nikolaus Seyringer was sent to visit Melk and reform in both spiritual and temporal matters. He restored communal living, admitted novices who were not of noble birth and instituted customs (consuetudines) in addition to the Benedictine rule. These were based on the customs of Seyringer's own abbey of Subiaco. The reform was put into writing in a "visitation charter" and Seyringer became the new abbot.

The reformed observance of Melk was expanded under Seyringer and his successors through visitations. It reached the Augustinian canonry of Indersdorf and in 1426, at the invitation of Duke William III of Bavaria, it reached Tegernsee Abbey, bringing the reform to Bavaria. Besides discipline and adherence to the rule and customs, the Melk Reform insisted on liturgical revival and literary production. It was a vehicle for the spread of humanism, especially through its connection to Nicholas of Dinkelsbühl of the University of Vienna.
