= Nikolaus von Dinkelsbühl =

Austrian Roman Catholic clergyman, pulpit orator and theologian

Nikolaus von Dinkelsbühl was an Austrian Roman Catholic clergyman, pulpit orator and theologian.

== Biography ==
He was born c. 1360, in Dinkelsbühl. He studied at the University of Vienna where he is mentioned as baccalaureus in the faculty of Arts in 1385. Magister in 1390, he lectured in philosophy, mathematics and physics until 1397, and from 1402 to 1405. From 1397 he was dean of the faculty; he studied theology, lecturing until 1402 on theological subjects, first as cursor biblicus, and later on the Sentences of Peter Lombard. In 1405 he became bachelor of Divinity, in 1408 licentiate and in 1409 doctor and member of the theological faculty. Rector of the university, 1405–6, he declined the honor of a re-election in 1409. From 1405 he was also canon at the Viennese cathedral of St. Stephen. The supposition of several early authors that he was a member of the Order of the Hermits of St. Augustine is incorrect, for he could not have been rector of the university had he been a member of any order.

Eminent as teacher and pulpit orator, Nikolaus possessed great business acumen and was frequently chosen as ambassador both by the university and the reigning prince. He represented Duke Albert V of Austria at the Council of Constance (1414–18) and the University of Vienna in the trial of Thiem, dean of the Passau cathedral.

When Emperor Sigismund came to Constance, Nikolaus delivered an address on the abolition of the schism ("Sermo de unione Ecclesiae in Concilium Constantiense," II, 7, Frankfort, 1697, 182–7). He took part in the election of Martin V, and delivered an address to the new pope (Sommerfeldt, "Historisches Jahrbuch", XXVI, 1905, 323–7). Together with John, Patriarch of Constantinople, he was charged with the examination of witnesses in the proceedings against Hieronymus of Prague.

Returning to Vienna in 1418, he again took up his teaching duties at the university, and in 1423 directed the theological promotions as representative of the chancellor. Duke Albert V having chosen him as his confessor in 1425, wished to make him Bishop of Passau, but Nikolaus declined the appointment. During the preparations for the Council of Basle, he was one of the committee to draw up the reform proposals which were to be presented to the council. His name does not appear thereafter in the records of the university. He died on 17 March 1433, at Mariazell in Styria.

== Writings ==
His published works include "Postilla cum sermonibus evangeliorum dominicalium" (Strasburg, 1496) and a collection of "Sermones" with tracts (Strasburg, 1516).

Among his numerous unpublished works, the manuscripts of which are chiefly kept in the Court library at Vienna and in the Court and State library at Munich, are to be mentioned his commentaries on the Psalms, Isaias, the Gospel of St. Matthew, some of the Epistles of St. Paul, the "Sentences" of Peter Lombard and "Questiones Sententiarum"; a commentary on the "Physics" of Aristotle, numerous sermons, lectures and moral and ascetic tracts.
