= Justin Rosenfeld =

Film producer

Justin Rosenfeld was a producer and distributor of films in Germany during the time of the Weimar Republic.

== Life ==
He was born in 1901 in Schopfloch, Bavaria, Germany. Studied law and economics and was initially employed by the banking house of Wilhelm Vogt & Co in Hamburg. He subsequently became President of Orbis Film G.m.bH of Berlin where he had full responsibility for advertising, licensing and translation of non German language films for the German market. As a producer he oversaw the stories, casting and production of German language films. Particularly noteworthy and successful was Razzia in Sankt Pauli (1932). This film portrayed a slice of life in the gritty harbor quarter of Hamburg. It may have been the first instance of employment, as extras, of local people playing roles which were the same as their day-to-day activities, that is to say, policemen, locals in a harbor tavern and men and women of questionable character. This film was banned in 1933 by the Nazi censors as counter to morality. As a Jew he was forced to cease his film work and arrested in 1938, though subsequently released. He fled to the United States and died in Rochester, New York in 1947.
