= Raid in St. Pauli =

1932 film

- Directed by: Werner Hochbaum
- Written by: Werner Hochbaum
- Produced by: Justin Rosenfeld
- Starring: Gina Falckenberg; Friedrich Gnass; Wolfgang Zilzer
- Cinematography: A.O. Weitzenberg
- Edited by: Carl Behr
- Music by: Kurt Levaal
- Production company: Vera Filmatelier Hamburg
- Distributed by: Orbis Film
- Release date: 20 May 1932
- Running time: 74 minutes
- Country: Weimar Republic
- Language: German
- Budget: $8000

Raid in St. Pauli (German: Razzia in St. Pauli) is a 1932 German drama film directed by Werner Hochbaum and starring Gina Falckenberg, Friedrich Gnaß and Wolfgang Zilzer. The film's sets were designed by the art director Willy Schiller.

It was made at the end of the Weimar Republic era. It illustrates the powerlessness of the ordinary worker and paints an intimate portrait of the joys and sorrows of a small group of people in the harbor section of Hamburg.

== Synopsis ==
A social drama plays out in the harbor area of Hamburg: Ballhaus-Else, a prostitute, lives together with her boyfriend Leo, a peaceful bar musician, in St. Pauli. One day, Matrosen-Karl, a thief on the run, finds a hideout at Else's. She is fascinated by the man, who promises her a more exciting and better life. Together they want to leave Hamburg. Leo – who feels inferior to Karl – lets them go with a heavy heart. But then Karl gets arrested after a fight between the underworld and the police in the Kongo-Bar, and Else returns to Leo – and her hopeless everyday life.

The most important characteristic of this film is the use of local people, including those of somewhat gritty character, as extras playing parts that they actually lived at that time.

== Production ==
Orbis-Film GmbH, Berlin.

- Producer: Justin Rosenfeld
- Director: Werner Hochbaum
- Camera: A. O. Weitzenberg
- Set: Willy Schiller
- Editor: Carl Behr
- Sound: Franz Schröder
- Music: Kurt Levaal
- Musical treatment and direction: Giuseppe Becce
- Song texts: Carl Behr, Hedy Knorr
- Singer: Charly Wittong, Ernst Busch
- Music Titles: Drive me once rover, drive me once rover (orig title German), In our home town, one always comes back (orig title German) (Behr), Song of the harbor workmen (orig title German) (Knorr), What use is the crown to the emperor? (orig title German).

== Cast ==
- Gina Falckenberg as Ballhaus-Else
- Friedrich Gnaß as Matrosen-Karl
- Wolfgang Zilzer as Musiker-Leo
- Charly Wittong as Volkssänger
- Max Zilzer as Kneipenwirt
- Ernst Busch as Sänger
- Kurt Appel
- Käte Hüter
- Friedrich Rittmeyer

== Film Studio ==
Vera-Filmatelier Hamburg. Exterior location: Hamburg. Runtime and film length: 74 min, 2016 m. Format: 35mm, s/w, 1:1.33, Celluloid sound film. Official Certification: 11 April 1932, B.31364, Jv. / DP: 7 December 1933, O.31364, First Official showing: 20 May 1932, Berlin (U.T. Kurfürstendamm). Banned on 7 December 1933 by the Nazi Film Review Office.
