= Friedrich von Hermann =

German economist and statistician

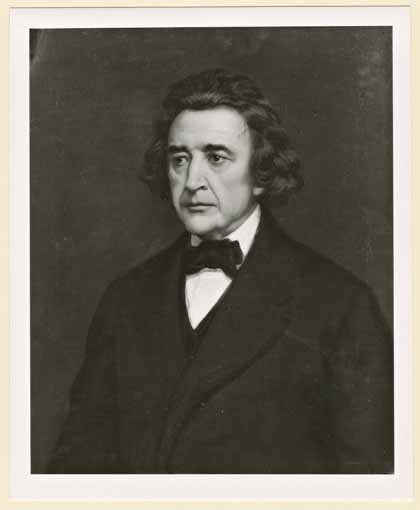
Friedrich von Hermann

Friedrich Benedikt Wilhelm von Hermann (5 December 1795 – 23 November 1868) was a German economist and statistician.

== Biography ==
Friedrich von Hermann was born on 5 December 1795, at Dinkelsbühl in Bavaria. After finishing his primary education he was for some time employed in a draughtsman's office. He then resumed his studies, partly at the gymnasium in his native town, partly at the universities of Erlangen and Würzburg. In 1817 he began working for a private school at Nuremberg, where he remained for four years. After filling an appointment as teacher of mathematics at the gymnasium of Erlangen, he became in 1823 Privatdozent at the university in that town. His inaugural dissertation was on the notions of political economy among the Romans (Dissertatio exhibens sententias Romanorum ad oeconomiam politicam pertinentes, Erlangen, 1823). He afterwards acted as professor of mathematics at the gymnasium and polytechnic school in Nuremberg, where he continued till 1827. During his stay there he published an elementary treatise on arithmetic and algebra (Lehrbuch der Arith. u. Algeb., 1826), and made a journey to France to inspect the organization and conduct of technical schools in that country. The results of his investigation were published in 1826 and 1828 (Über technische Unterrichts-Anstalten).

Soon after his return from France, he was made professor extraordinarius of political science of the Ludwig-Maximilians-Universität München, and in 1833 he was advanced to the rank of ordinary professor. In 1832 appeared the first edition of his great work on political economy, Staatswirthschaftliche Untersuchungen (“Investigations in Political Economy”). In 1835 he was made member of the Royal Bavarian Academy of Sciences. From the year 1836 he acted as inspector of technical instruction in Bavaria, and made frequent journeys to Berlin and Paris in order to study the methods there pursued. In the state service of Bavaria, to which he devoted himself, he rose rapidly. In 1837 he was placed on the council for superintendence of church and school work; in 1839 he was entrusted with the direction of the bureau of statistics; in 1845 he was one of the councillors for the interior.

In 1848 he sat as member for Munich in the national assembly at Frankfort. In this assembly Hermann, with Johann Heckscher and others, was mainly instrumental in organizing the so-called "Great German" party, and was selected as one of the representatives of their views at Vienna. Warmly supporting the customs union (Zollverein), he acted in 1851 as one of its commissioners at the great industrial exhibition at London, and published an elaborate report on the woollen goods. Three years later he was president of the committee of judges at the similar exhibition at Munich, and the report of its proceedings was drawn up by him. In 1855 he became councillor of state, the highest honour in the service.

From 1835 to 1847 he contributed a long series of reviews, mainly of works on economical subjects, to the Münchener gelehrte Anzeigen and also wrote for Rau's Archiv der politischen Ökonomie and the Augsburger allgemeine Zeitung. As head of the bureau of statistics he published a series of valuable annual reports (Beiträge zur Statistik des Königreichs Bayern, Hefte 1-17, 1850–1867). In later years, this work was regarded as distinguishing him as a pioneer in the field of statistics. He was engaged at the time of his death, on 23 November 1868, upon a second edition of his Staatswirthschaftliche Untersuchungen, which was published in 1870.

== Staatswirthschaftliche Untersuchungen ==
The Staatswirthschaftliche Untersuchungen (“Investigations in Political Economy”; 1832, 2nd ed. 1870), although not a systematic treatise on political economy, has been regarded by some as the most important contribution to political economy since the Wealth of Nations in many aspects. It cannot, indeed, be said to contain principles which are in themselves novel or original; Hermann's merits are not so much those of a discoverer as of a most acute and subtle critic. Like David Ricardo he excels in abstract analysis, in resolution of complex phenomena into their simpler elements, but he has a more firm hold than Ricardo ever seems to have possessed of the true nature of these elementary facts, and a remarkable power of precisely stating and comprehensively combining them. The peculiar value of the Untersuchungen consists in the strict analysis to which the primary notions of economics are subjected, in the general conception of the method and plan of the science which emerges from this analysis, and in the way in which fundamental principles are carried out in the detailed problems of the science.

Some thought Hermann's approach allowed the clear rendering of the position of a pure theory of economic facts as an indispensable and independent branch of social science, as opposed to the historic method of inquiry, which was seen as fatal to much that was regarded as distinctive of the abstract or English school of political economy. Hermann's approach, and that of the writers of continental Europe who followed him, was thus seen as harmonizing perfectly with the theory of the elementary facts from which economical development takes its start.

At the time of his death, Hermann had recast, enlarged, and amended nearly two-thirds of the second edition of the Untersuchungen. What was finally published by his friends Dr. Helferich and Dr. Mayr also included those parts of the first edition which had not been revised or superseded. There were later several reprints.

The second edition of the Untersuchungen consists of ten separate essays, of which the first, on the fundamental notions of economics (“Grundlegung,” pp. 1–77), the fifth (pp. 143–389, on “Production”), the sixth (pp. 390–459, on “Price”), the eighth (pp. 448–531, on “Profit”), and the ninth (pp. 582–598, on “Revenue”) are of the greatest importance. In the “Grundlegung,” a clear and lucid description is given of the simple phenomena, in family, community, and state, upon which the investigations are founded. Human wants and the satisfaction to be obtained for them by labour exercised on natural agents are recognized as the primitive facts. But in the satisfaction of wants there are two aspects, the technical and the economical. Technically we consider solely the process by which commodities of a quality suited to satisfy want are obtained. Economically we have always to estimate the ratio between the effort expended and the result obtained. An “economy” is a distribution of forces so that the result, satisfaction, may be obtained with least expenditure of effort, with least loss of utility. The influence of this economical principle, the institutions to which it gives rise, the conditions under which it is possible, and the circumstances which affect, modify, or counteract it, are traced with reference to the individual, the family, the community, and the state or nation. The increasing complexity of the phenomena does not alter the nature of the principle which lies at the basis of them, and it is the business of economic theory to analyse these phenomena under guidance of the general principle. Economics is therefore defined by Hermann as the “quantitative theory of goods;” and, though he is sparing in the use of symbols, his method of treatment is throughout mathematical. Deserving of attention is the manner in which he points out the influence of collective feeling and collective wants as giving rise to special institutions (government, defence) in the community. To this first fundamental essay the three succeeding papers (“Wants,” “Goods,” “Economy,” pp. 78–142) are appendices. The treatment of these, the classifications given, the detailed discussion of particular points, e.g., the productivity of labour, and the distinction drawn between economical estimates from the individual or the collective point of view, make up a solid contribution to the science.

The fifth essay is an elaborate treatise on the theory of production, treating the agents of production free goods, labour, and capital separately, then the interests of the several parties engaged, and the changes due to variations in the cost of producing. Under “Labour” is given the most complete and systematic discussion of separation of employments. Capital is defined so as to include land, but careful reference is made to the distinctive peculiarities of this form of wealth. Especially remarkable is Hermann's treatment of what he calls Nutz-capital (“service capital”), with regard to which he accepts almost entirely the view of J. B. Say. Under fixed capital a very elaborate treatment of the nature and economic influence of machines is given, while the handling of changes in the cost of production, both here and in the essay on “Profit,” is acute and luminous.

The sixth essay analyses the forces which underlie supply and demand. These are stated to be:

(a) on the side of the purchaser :

(1) his desire for the commodity in question, or its utility to him
(2) his means
(3) the competition of sellers

(b) on the side of the seller :

(1) cost of production
(2) competition of the buyers
(3) the value of the medium of exchange

The same considerations are shown to hold good in the case of the price of labour, though unfortunately the seventh essay, on “Wages,” is incomplete. The eighth essay, on “Profit,” discusses very elaborately the rate of return on the various species of capital and the circumstances that determine it, distinguishes interest from profit in general, and marks as a special form the “profit of the entrepreneur” (German: Unternehmergewinn). This last he regards as distinct from wages of superintendence, and from insurance for risk. The ninth and tenth essays, on “Revenue” and “Consumption,” are perhaps specially interesting from the clear mode in which the theory, afterwards called that of the wages fund, is rejected, and from the precision with which the diverse points of view for estimating net revenue are discriminated.

This brief analysis characterizes Hermann's work in pure economics. On practical questions, those of economic legislation, his opinions are only to be gathered with difficulty from the papers in the Gelehrte Anzeigen, and generally were expressed with such reference to special circumstances as to render doubtful their full import. It seems probable, however, that his views on protection were far from clear, and that he was somewhat under the sway of the principle that the best financial policy is encouragement of national industry.

== Appreciation ==
Hermann's rare technological knowledge gave him a great advantage in dealing with some economic questions. He reviewed the principal fundamental ideas of the science with great thoroughness and acuteness. "His strength," says Roscher, "lies in his clear, sharp, exhaustive distinction between the several elements of a complex conception, or the several steps comprehended in a complex act." For keen analytical power his German brethren compare him with Ricardo. But he avoids several one-sided views of the English economist. Thus he places public spirit beside egoism as an economic motor, regards price as not measured by labour only but as a product of several factors, and habitually contemplates the consumption of the labourer, not as a part of the cost of production to the capitalist, but as the main practical end of economics.
