= Leukershausen =

Human settlement in Germany

Coordinates: 49.162°N 10.187°E

Leukershausen is a village in the eastern district of Schwäbisch Hall in Baden-Württemberg, Germany.

== Church ==
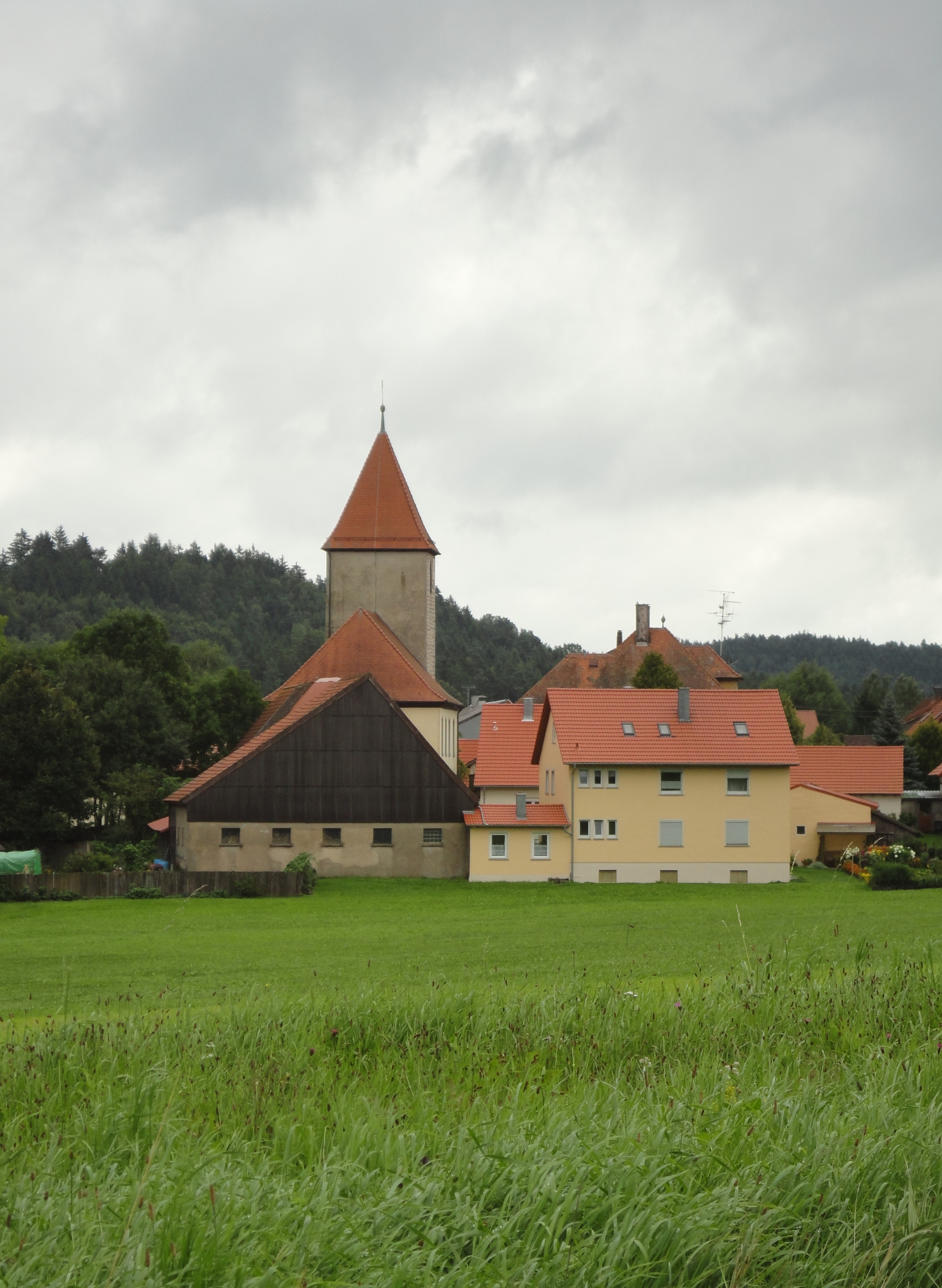

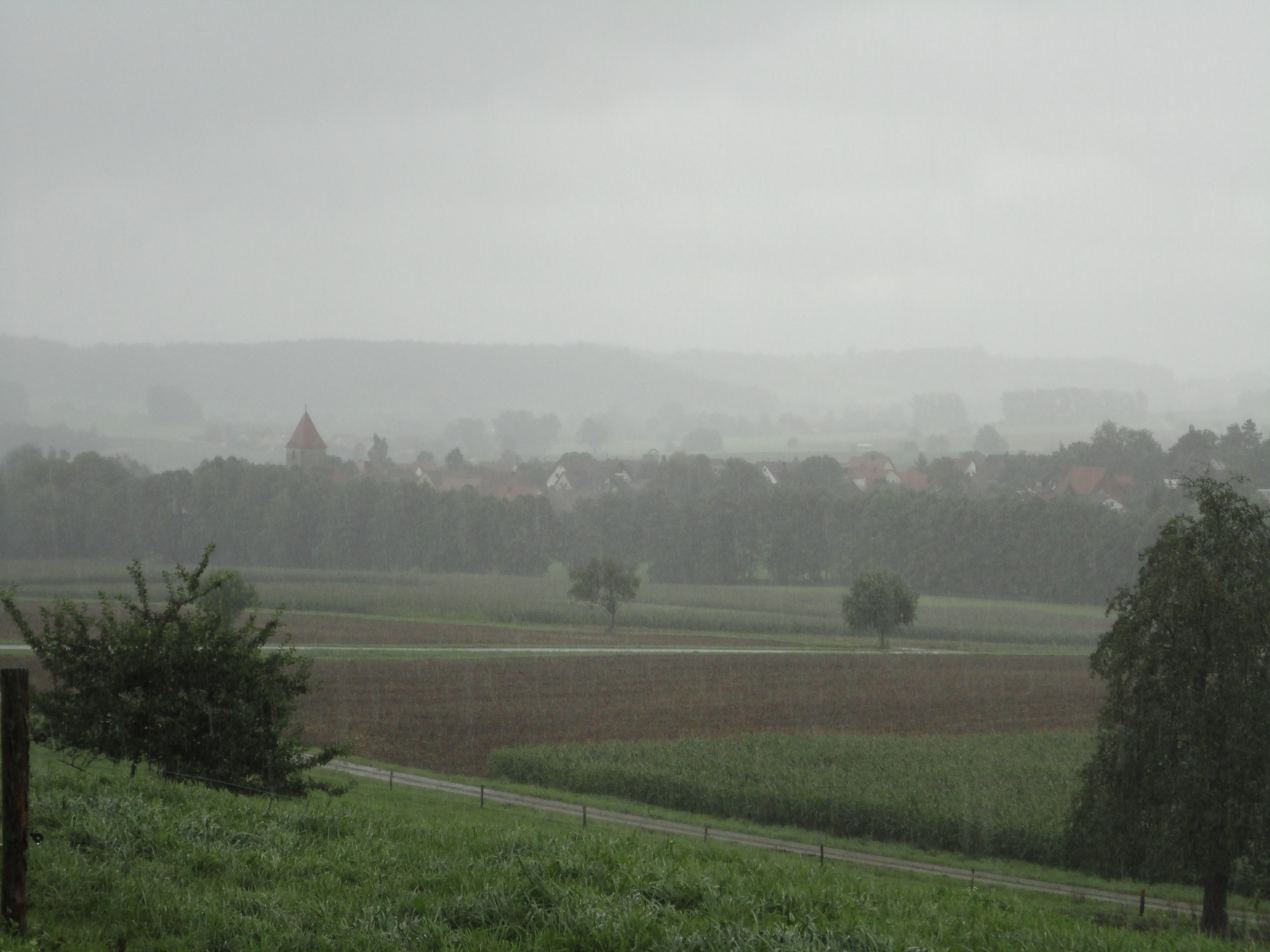

There is one church in Leukershausen that is named for its patron, St. John the Apostle. It is part of the Evangelical Church in Germany.
