= Lachoudisch =

Extinct dialect of German

- Lachoudisch
- Native to: Germany
- Region: Schopfloch, Bavaria
- Extinct: after 1994
- Language family: Indo-European: Germanic; West Germanic; High German; Lachoudisch
- Writing system: Latin

Language codes
- ISO 639-3: None (mis)
- Glottolog: None

Lachoudisch (Note: From Hebrew "lĺshōn + qodεsh" meaning "holy language".) was a dialect of German, containing many Hebrew and Yiddish words, native to the Bavarian town of Schopfloch. It was created in the sixteenth century. Few speakers remained after the Holocaust, and it went extinct sometime after.

== History ==
Lachoudisch formed in the 16th century, developing as an argot among several Jewish citizens who found it convenient to trade secrets in a language that non-Jews could not understand. The language spread within the community and eventually some non-Jews knew it too. As the Jewish community of Schopfloch mostly emigrated abroad and those who remained were eradicated by 1939, the language entered serious decline, and eventually went extinct.

== Features ==
Lachoudisch contained several Hebrew and Yiddish loanwords, many of which reflected the Jewish community's hostility to Christianity and government authority.

== Sample text ==
| Lachoudisch | English | German |
|---|---|---|
| Der Schoufett hockt im Juschbess und kippt sein Ranze voll | The Mayor is sitting in the bar filling his belly with booze | Der Bürgermeister sitzt in der Bar und füllt seinen Bauch mit Alkohol |

== See also ==
- Lotegorisch
