= Ton Thie =

Dutch footballer (1944–2021)

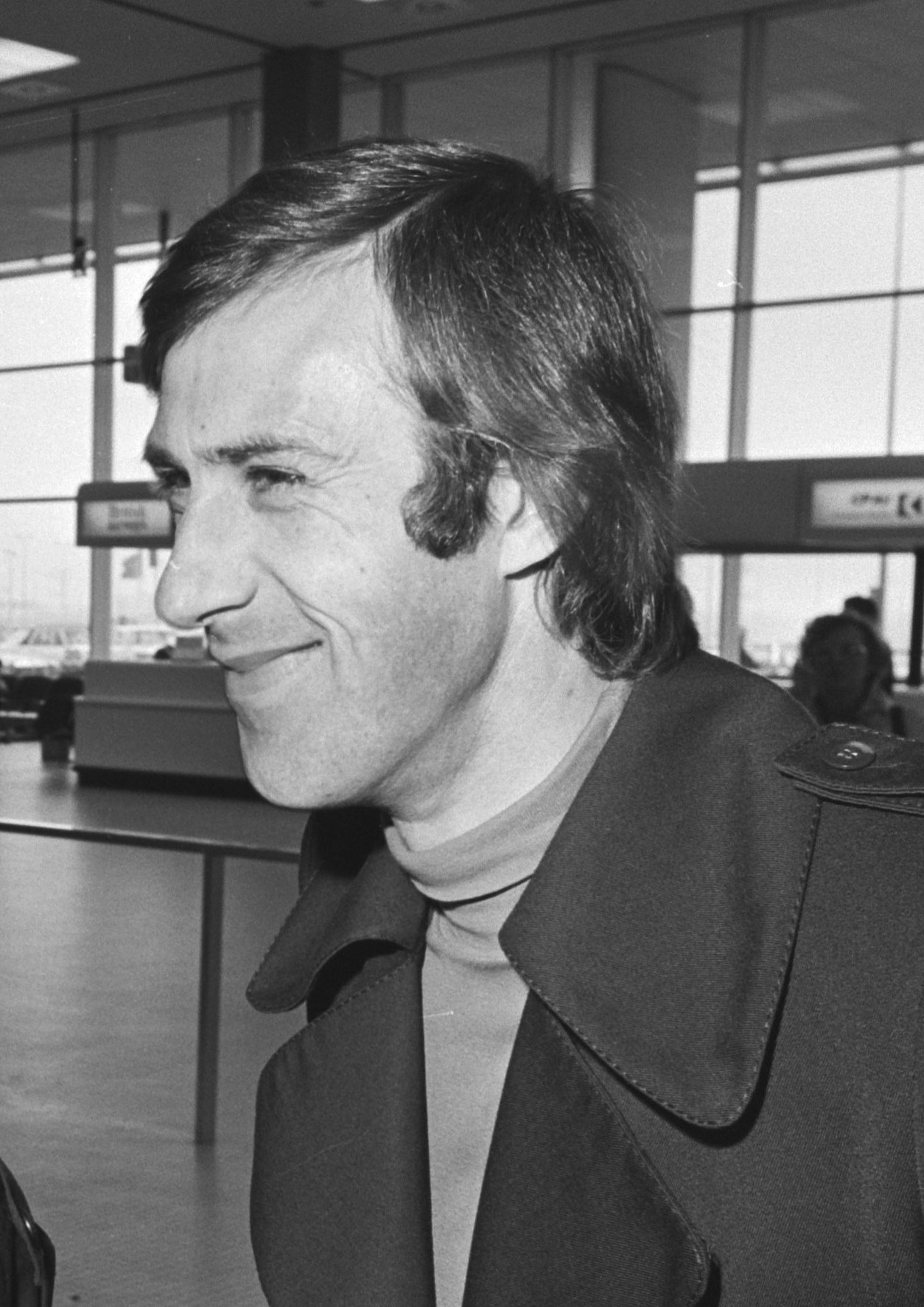
- Thie in 1976

Personal information
- Date of birth: 28 October 1944
- Place of birth: Gouda, Netherlands
- Date of death: 25 February 2021 (aged 76)
- Height: 6 ft 2 in (1.88 m)
- Position: Goalkeeper

Youth career
- GC & FC Olympia
- Excelsior

Senior career*
Years	Team	Apps	(Gls)
1962–1964	Hermes DVS		
1964–1977	ADO Den Haag	378	(0)
1967	→ Golden Gate Gales (loan)	12	(0)
1979	GC & FC Olympia		
- * Club domestic league appearances and goals

Ton Thie (28 October 1944 – 25 February 2021) was a Dutch professional footballer who played as a goalkeeper for GC & FC Olympia, Excelsior, Hermes DVS, ADO Den Haag, and the San Francisco Golden Gate Gales.

== Club career ==
Thie started at his hometown club GC & FC Olympia and was discovered by Excelsior coach Bob Janse. He played for Hermes DVS in the professional Tweede Divisie from 1962 until 1964. Tall and agile, he was signed by ADO Den Haag. He made 380 appearances for ADO Den Haag and won the KNVB Cup twice. His final game for them came in December 1976 against AZ'67. He was voted Den Haag's best goalkeeper of all time at the club's 100 year anniversary.

== International career ==
Thie was also selected on one occasion to the Dutch national squad, but did not make an appearance.

== Personal life ==
In 1996 he retired to The Gambia following a holiday. He died on 25 February 2021, aged 76.
