= Thiem =

Thiem is a surname with origins from Germany and Holland. People with the name include:

- Dominic Thiem (born 1993), Austrian professional tennis player
- George Thiem (1897–1987), American journalist
- Kathrin Thiem (born 1988), German rower

== See also ==
- Lê Văn Thiêm (1918–1991), Vietnamese scientist and mathematician
- Thiem solution, aquifer analysis method
