= Dinkelsbühl =

- Town
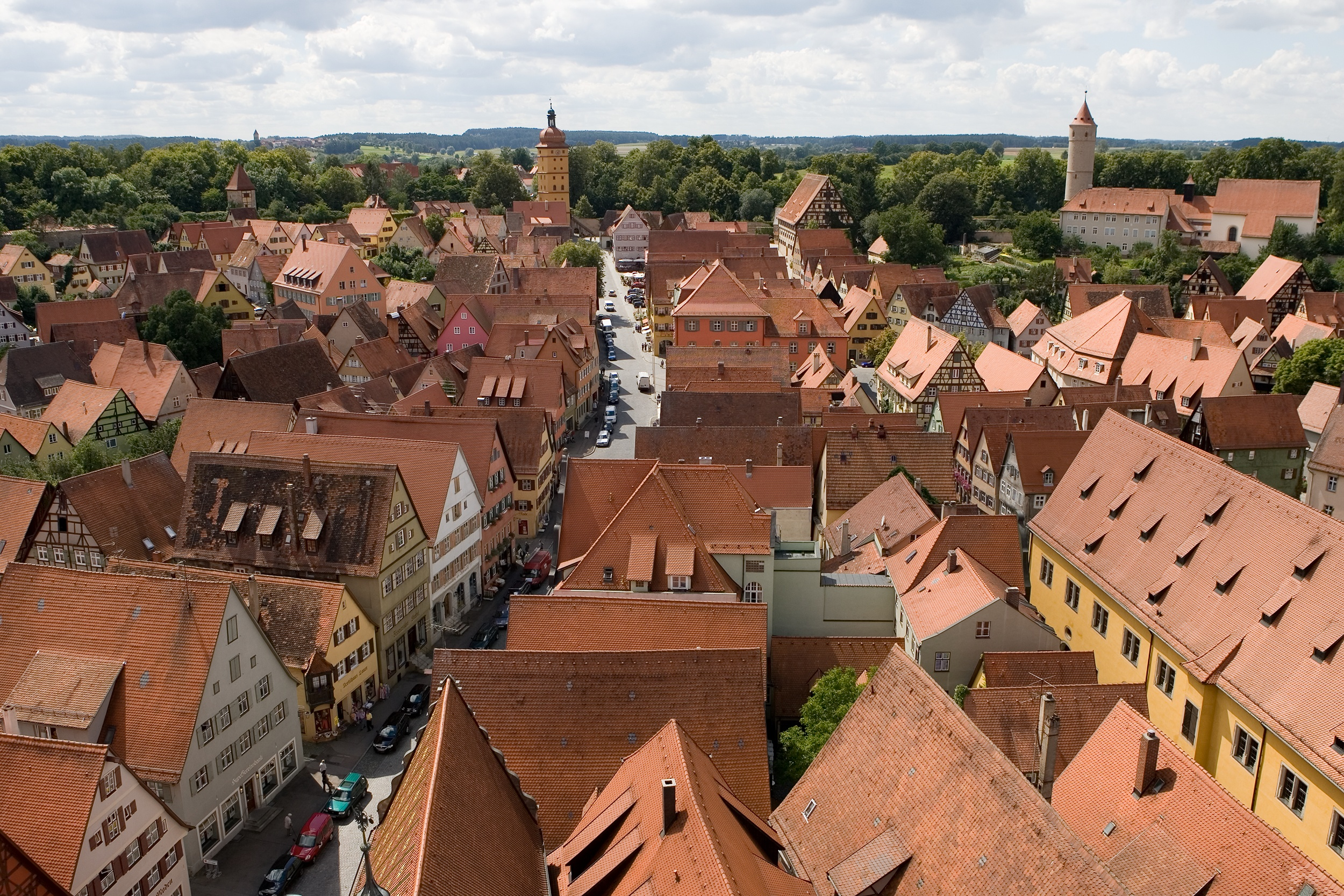
- View of the old town from the church tower

- Coat of arms

- Location of Dinkelsbühl within Ansbach district
- Interactive map of Dinkelsbühl
- Location within Germany Location within Bavaria
- Coordinates: 49°4′15″N 10°19′10″E
- Country: Germany
- State: Bavaria
- District: Ansbach

Government
  - Mayor (2020–26): Dr. Christoph Hammer (CSU)

Area
  - Total: 75.16 km^{2} (29.02 sq mi)
- Elevation: 442 m (1,450 ft)

Population (2025-12-31)
  - Total: 12,398
  - Density: 165.0/km^{2} (427.2/sq mi)
- Time zone: UTC+01:00 (CET)
  - Summer (DST): UTC+02:00 (CEST)
- Postal codes: 91550
- Dialling codes: 09851
- Vehicle registration: AN, DKB, FEU, ROT
- Website: dinkelsbuehl.de

Dinkelsbühl (German pronunciation: [ˈdɪŋkl̩sˌbyːl]) is a historic town in Central Franconia, a region of Germany that is now part of the state of Bavaria, in southern Germany. Dinkelsbühl is a former free imperial city of the Holy Roman Empire. In local government terms, Dinkelsbühl lies near the western edge of the Landkreis (or local government district) of Ansbach, north of Aalen.

Dinkelsbühl lies on the northern part of the Romantic Road, and is one of three particularly striking historic towns on the northern part of the route, the others being Rothenburg ob der Tauber and Nördlingen. These three, along with Berching, are today the only towns in Germany that still have completely intact city walls. All four are in Bavaria.

The town lies on the southern edge of the Franconian Heights and on the River Wörnitz, which rises in the town of Schillingsfürst. The population in 2013 was 11,315.

== History ==
Fortified by Emperor Henry V, in 1305 Dinkelsbühl received the same municipal rights as Ulm, and in 1351 was raised to the position of a Free Imperial City. Its municipal code, the Dinkelsbühler Recht, published in 1536, and revised in 1738, contained a very extensive collection of public and private laws.

=== Reformation ===
During the Protestant Reformation, Dinkelsbühl was notable for being – eventually along only with Ravensburg, Augsburg and Biberach an der Riß – a Bi-confessional (i.e. roughly equal numbers of Roman Catholics and Protestant citizens, with equal rights) Imperial City (German: Paritätische Reichsstadt) where the Peace of Westphalia caused the establishment of a joint Catholic–Protestant government and administrative system, with equality offices (German: Gleichberechtigung) and a precise and equal distribution between Catholic and Protestant civic officials. This status ended in 1802, when these cities were annexed by the Kingdom of Bavaria. Around 1534, the majority of the population of Dinkelsbühl became Protestant.

=== Present day ===
The film The Wonderful World of the Brothers Grimm (1962) was filmed on location in Dinkelsbühl.

The Werner Herzog film The Enigma of Kasper Hauser (German: Jeder für sich und Gott gegen alle; trans. Every Man for Himself and God Against All) premiered on 1 November 1974 in Dinkelsbühl, where it was originally filmed.

== Main sights ==
Dinkelsbühl is surrounded by it's medieval walls and towers. There exist a lot of attractions. The image of this town is typical for a German town of the 15th to early 17th centuries.

- St. George's Minster was built in the late 15th-century Gothic style to designs by Nikolaus Eseler. It is the largest hall church (one built without aisles) in the country.
- St. Paul's, now a Protestant church, was rebuilt in the 19th century in the style of the far late Roman architectural style. It was originally part of a monastery.
- The Castle of the Teutonic Order has a rococo chapel.
- The so-called Deutsches Haus is the ancestral home of the Counts of Drechsel-Deufstetten. It is a fine specimen of the German renaissance style of wooden architecture.
- Situated in front of the Minster is a monument to Christoph von Schmid (1768–1854), a 19th-century writer of stories for the young.
- Museum of the 3rd Dimension is housed in the former city mill.
- The Museum of History shows historical discoveries found within Dinkelsbühl and also has reconstructions of the ancient houses of the city. Since 2008, the museum has had a new domicile in the so-called "Steinerne Haus" from the 14th century. The official name is now: "house of history". While many of the artifacts are the same, the presentation is completely new.
- The church of St. Vincent, which is 2 km outside the city.
- The Summer Breeze Open Air heavy metal festival has been held in Dinkelsbühl since 2007.

== People from Dinkelsbühl ==
- Nikolaus von Dinkelsbühl (1360–1433), theologian, born in Dinkelsbühl.
- Christoph von Schmid (1768–1854), writer of children's stories, born in Dinkelsbühl.
- Friedrich von Hermann (1795–1868), economist and statistician, born in Dinkelsbühl.
- Stefan Reuter (born 1966), football world champion in 1990, born in Dinkelsbühl.

== Gallery ==
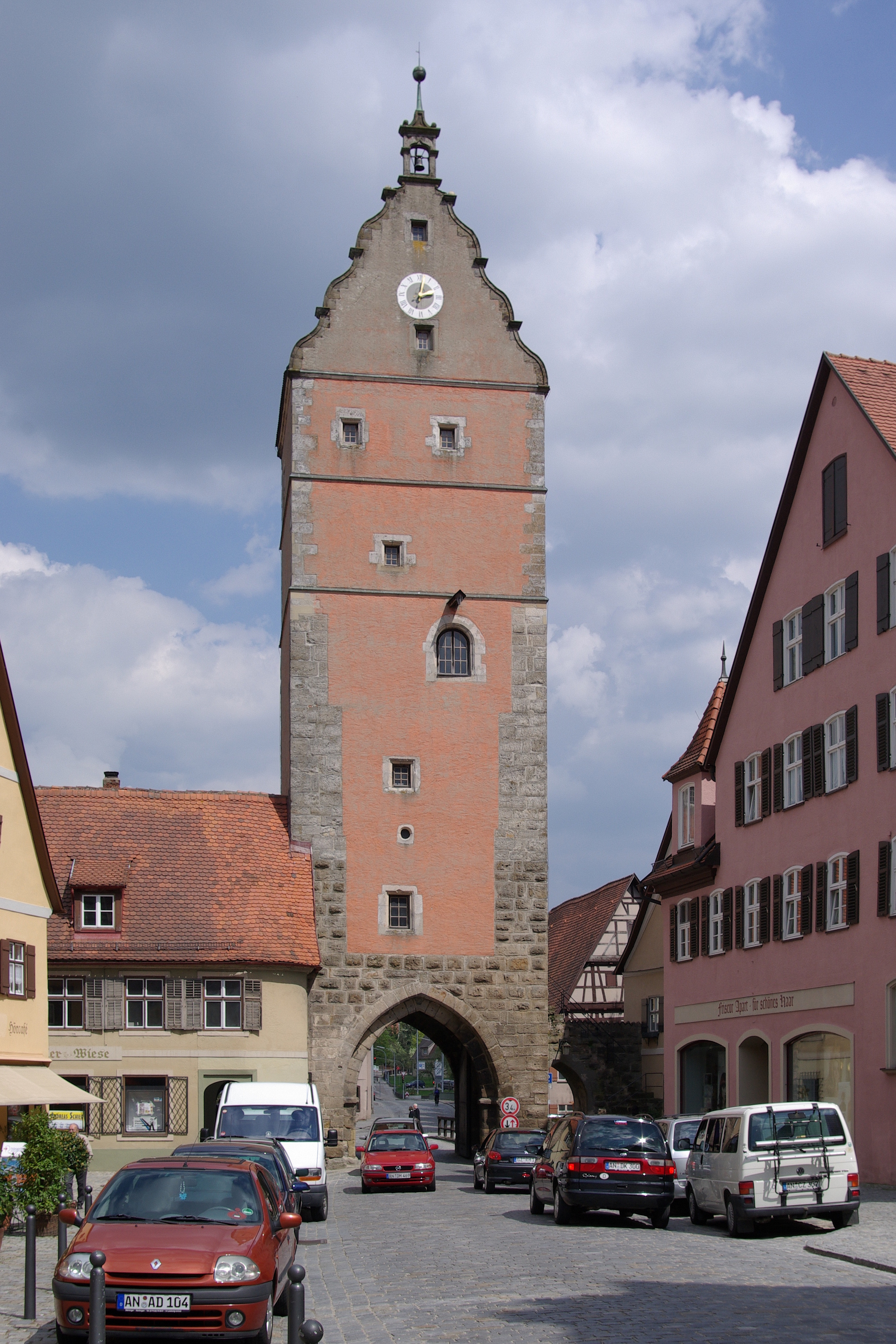
Wörnitz gate

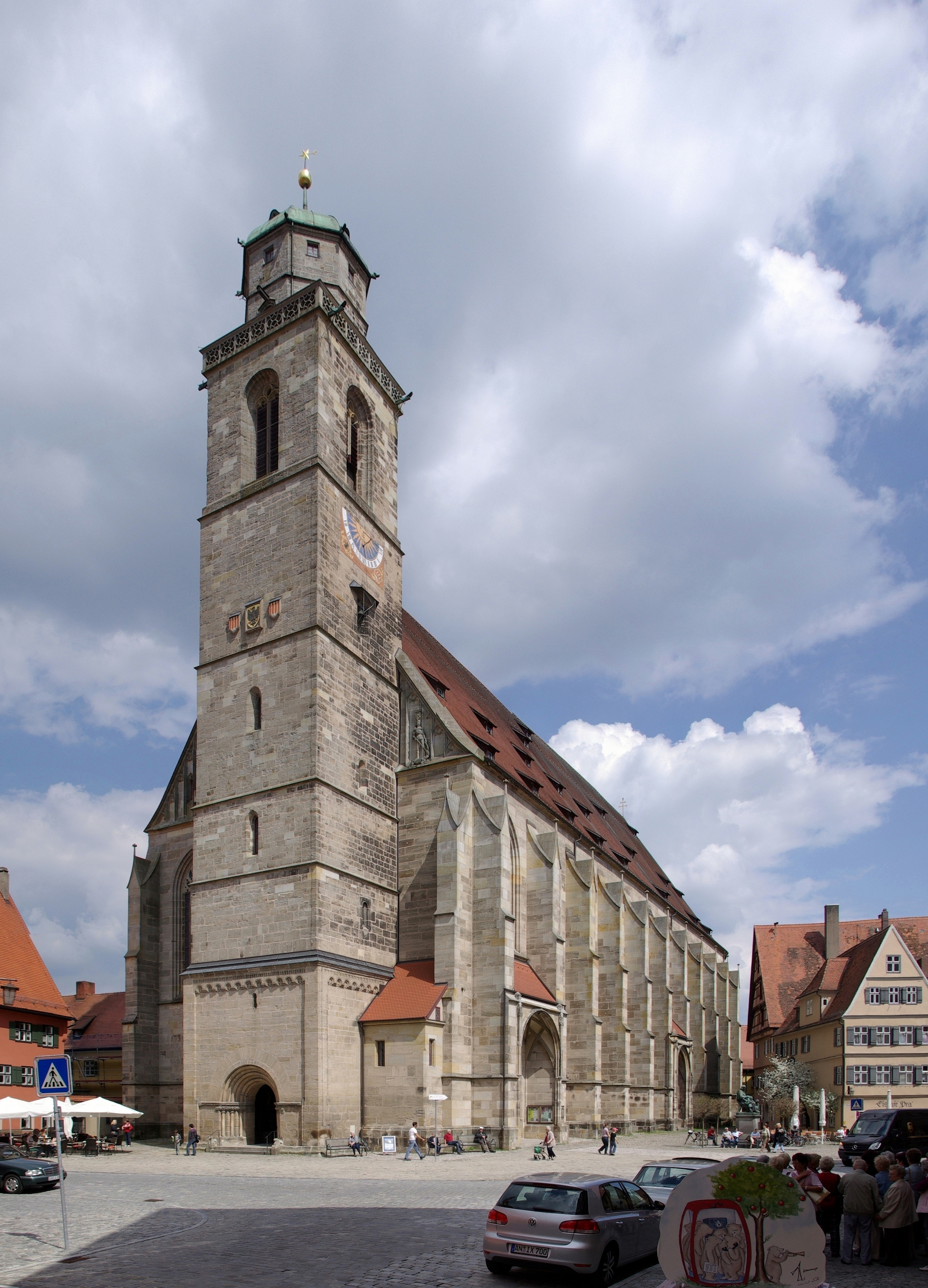
Saint George's Minster

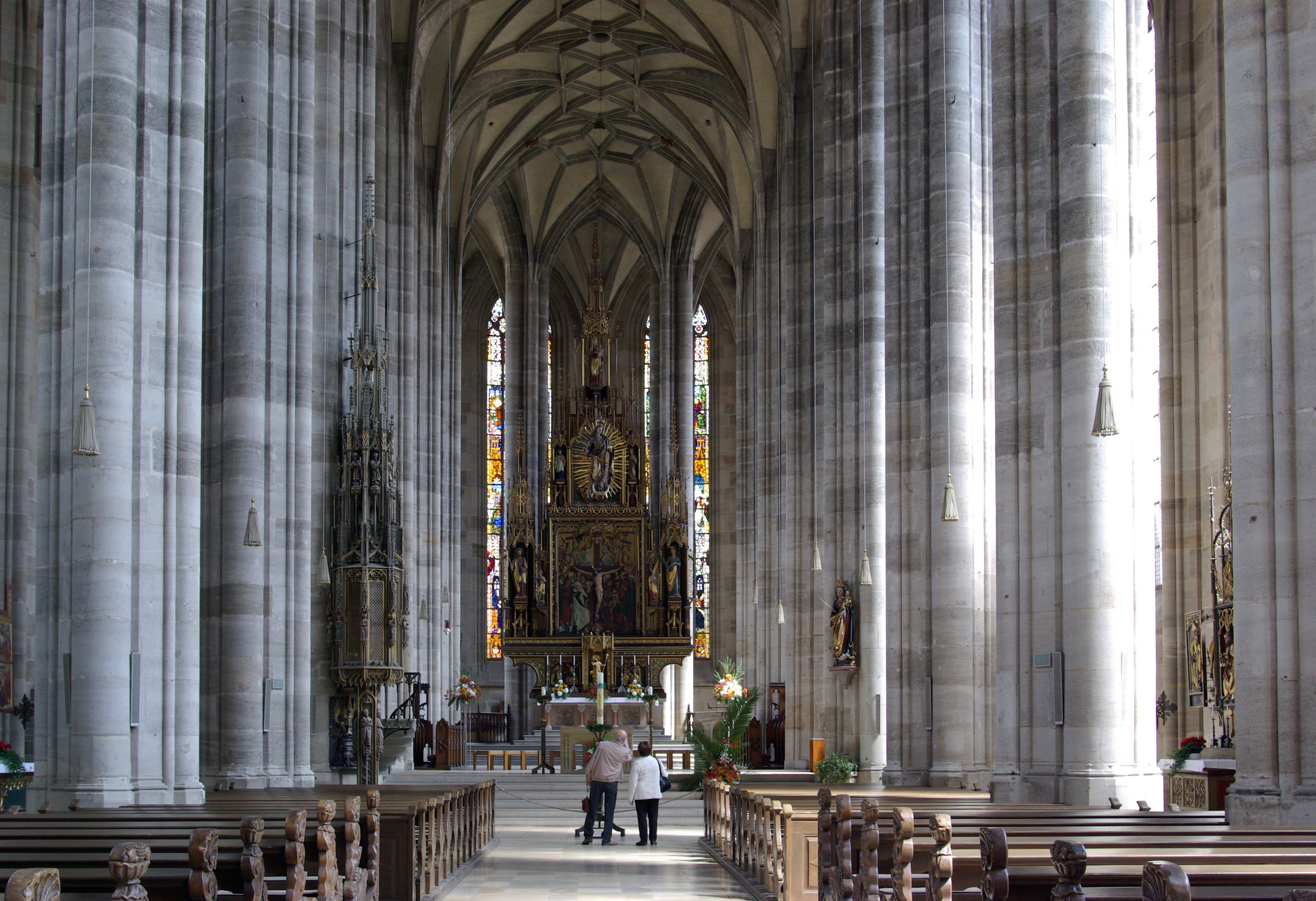
St. George's Minster interior

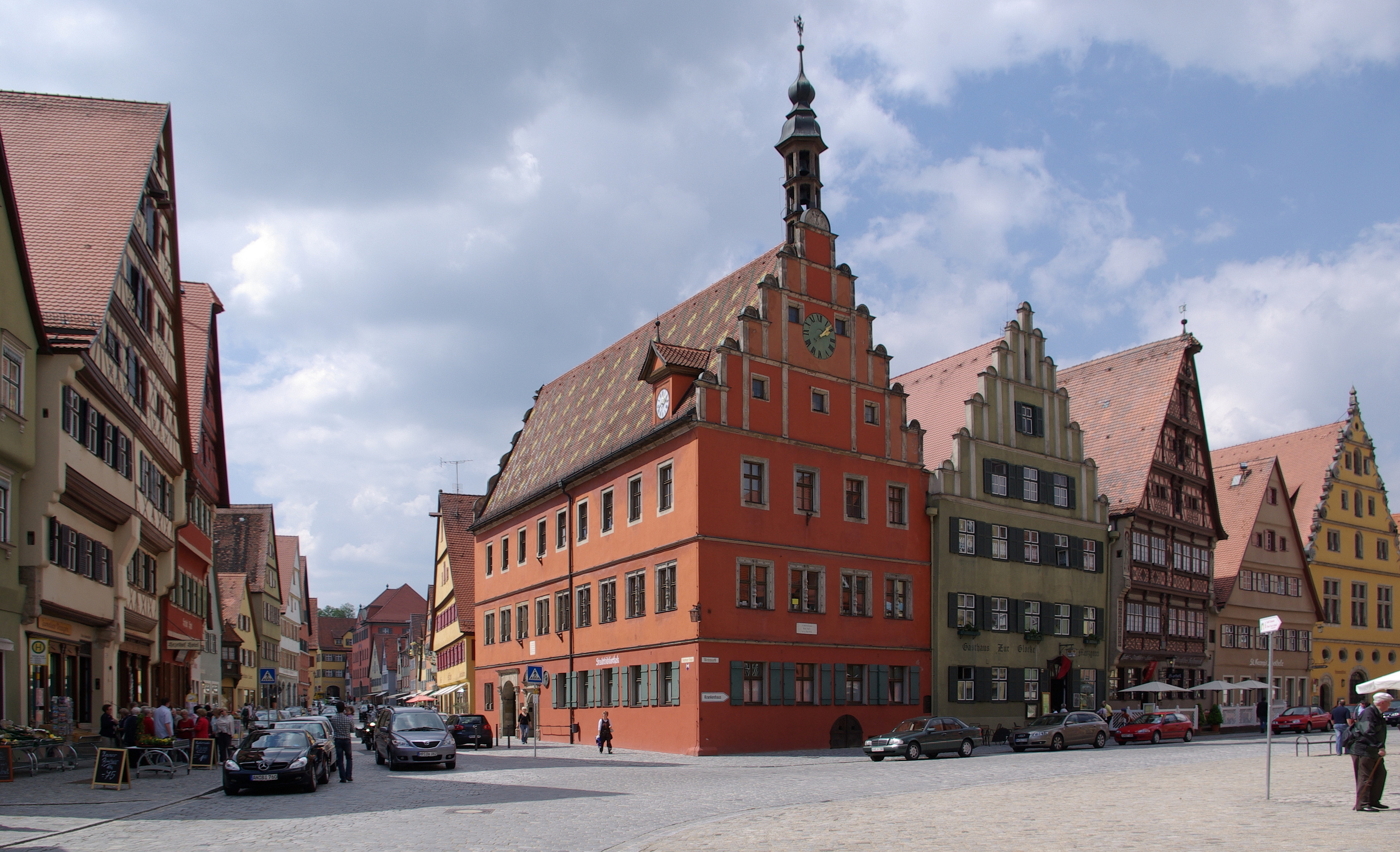
Market place with "Deutsches Haus" (3rd from right)

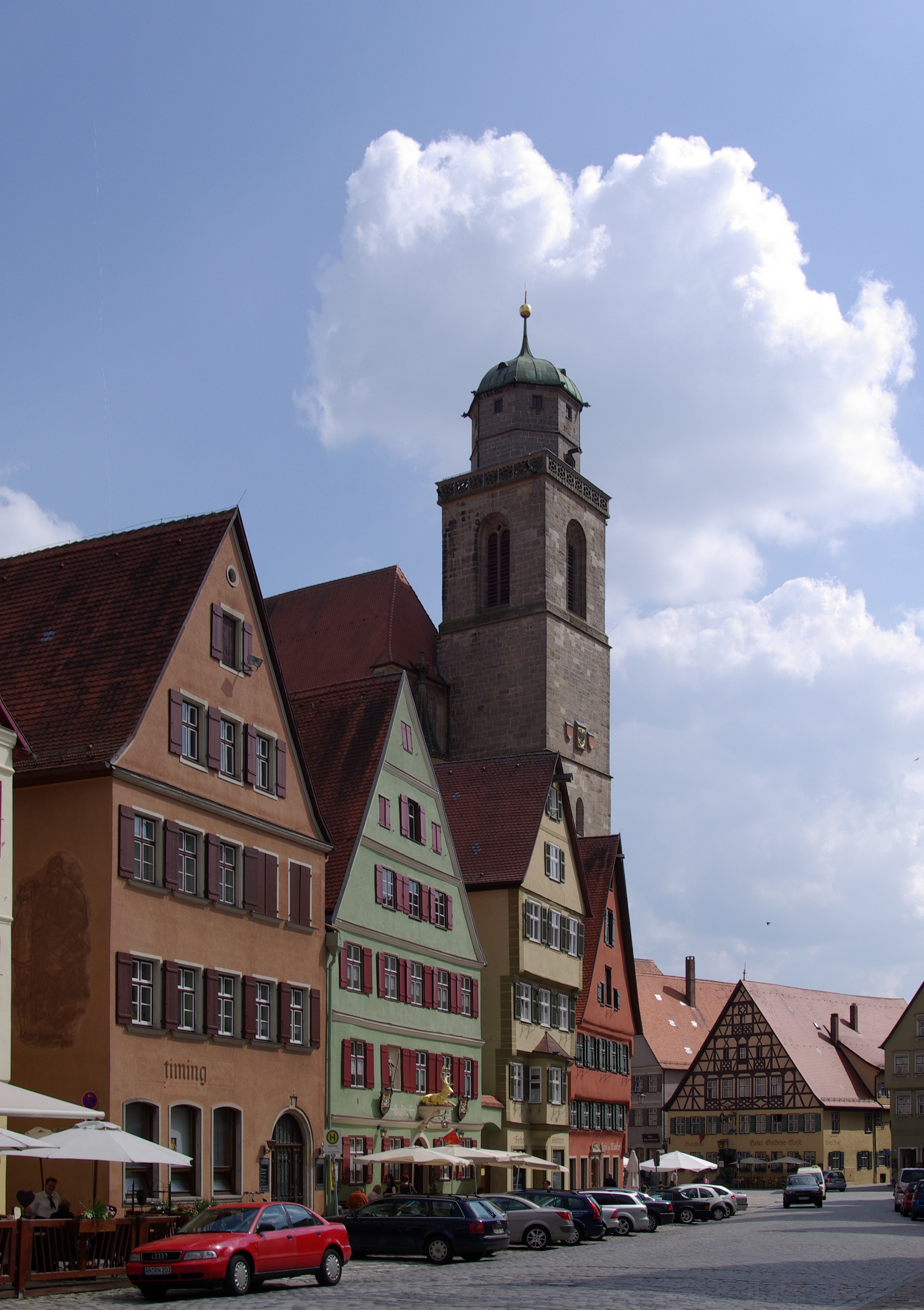
Weinmarkt

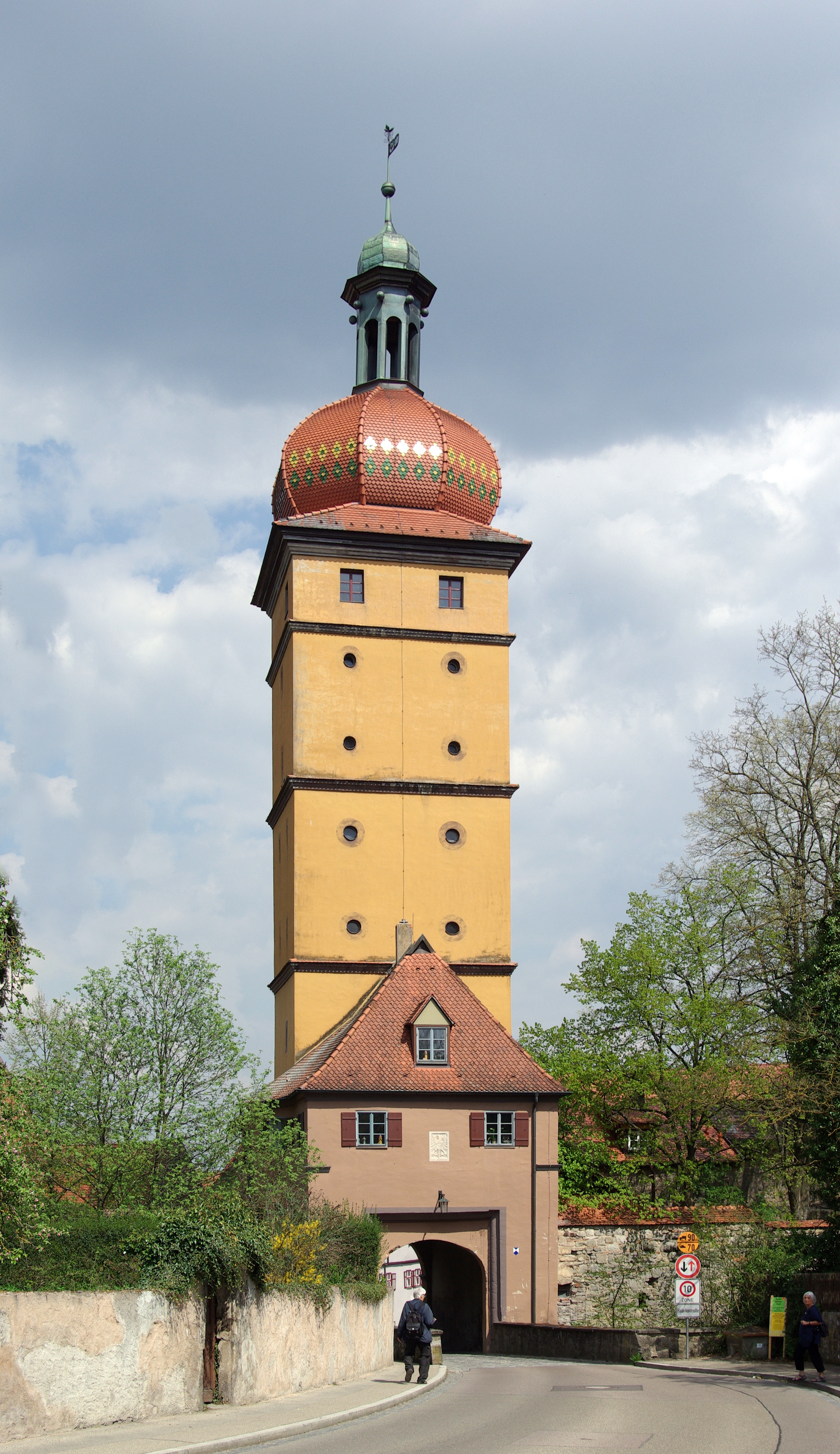
Segringen gate

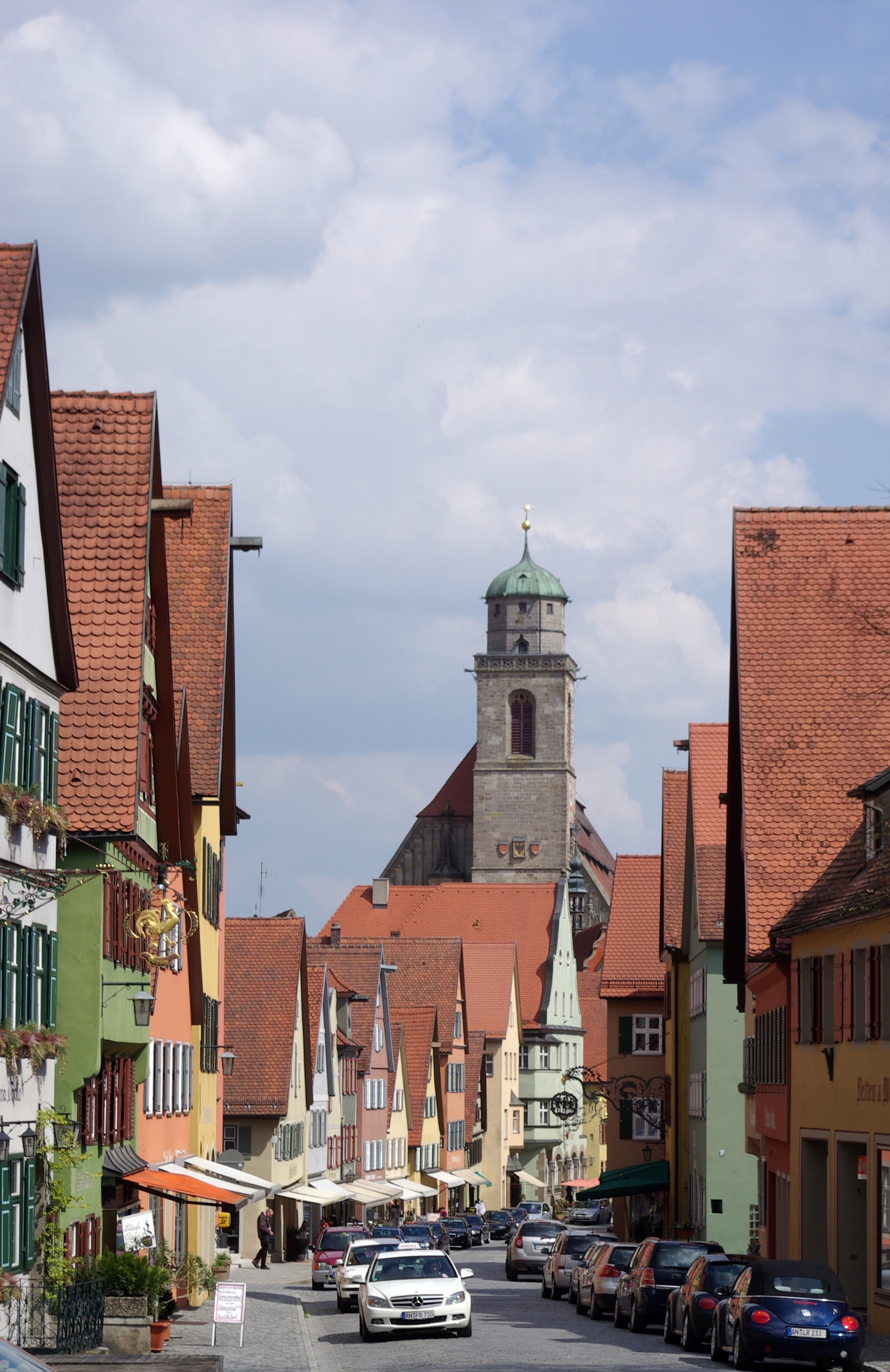
Segringen street

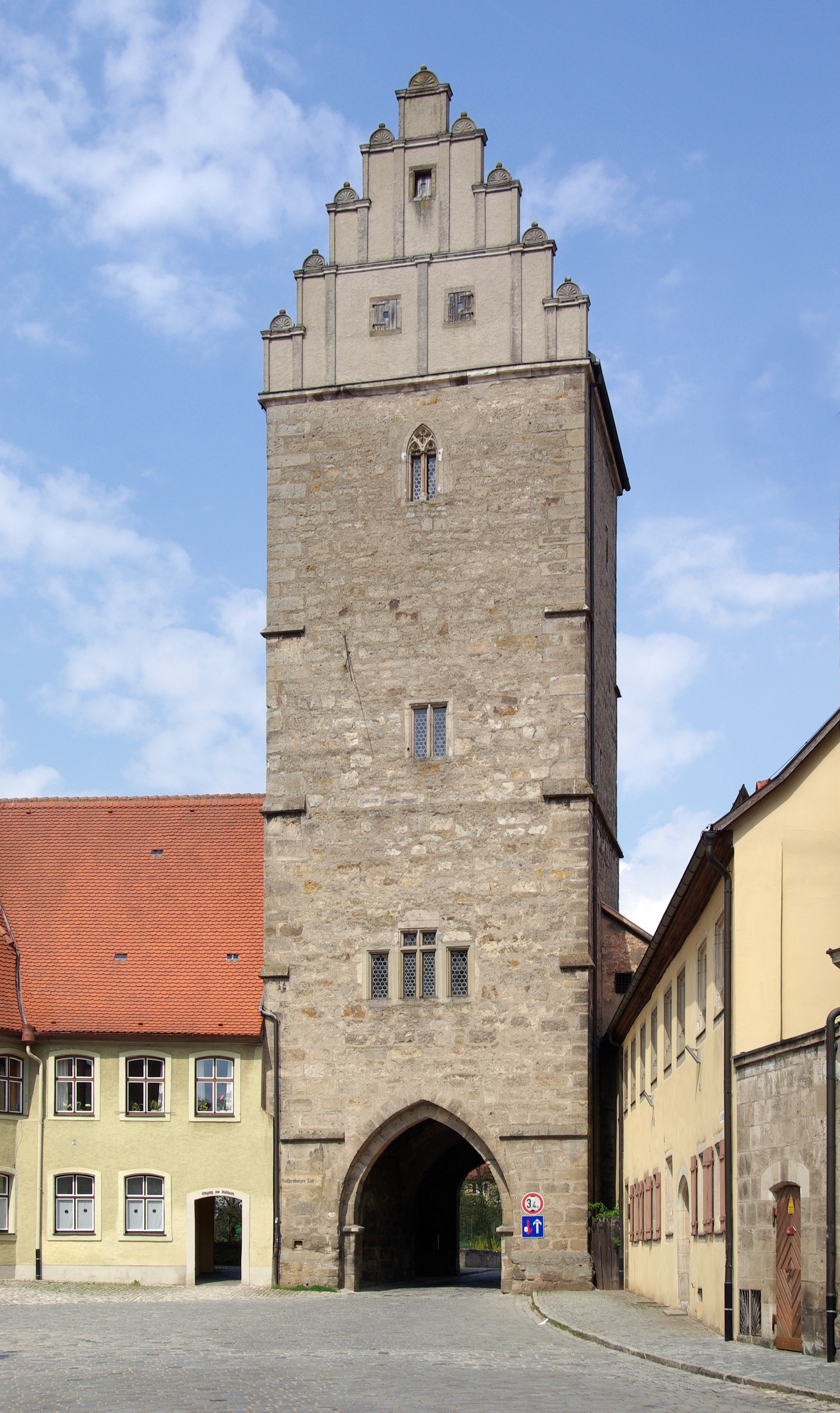
Rothenburg gate

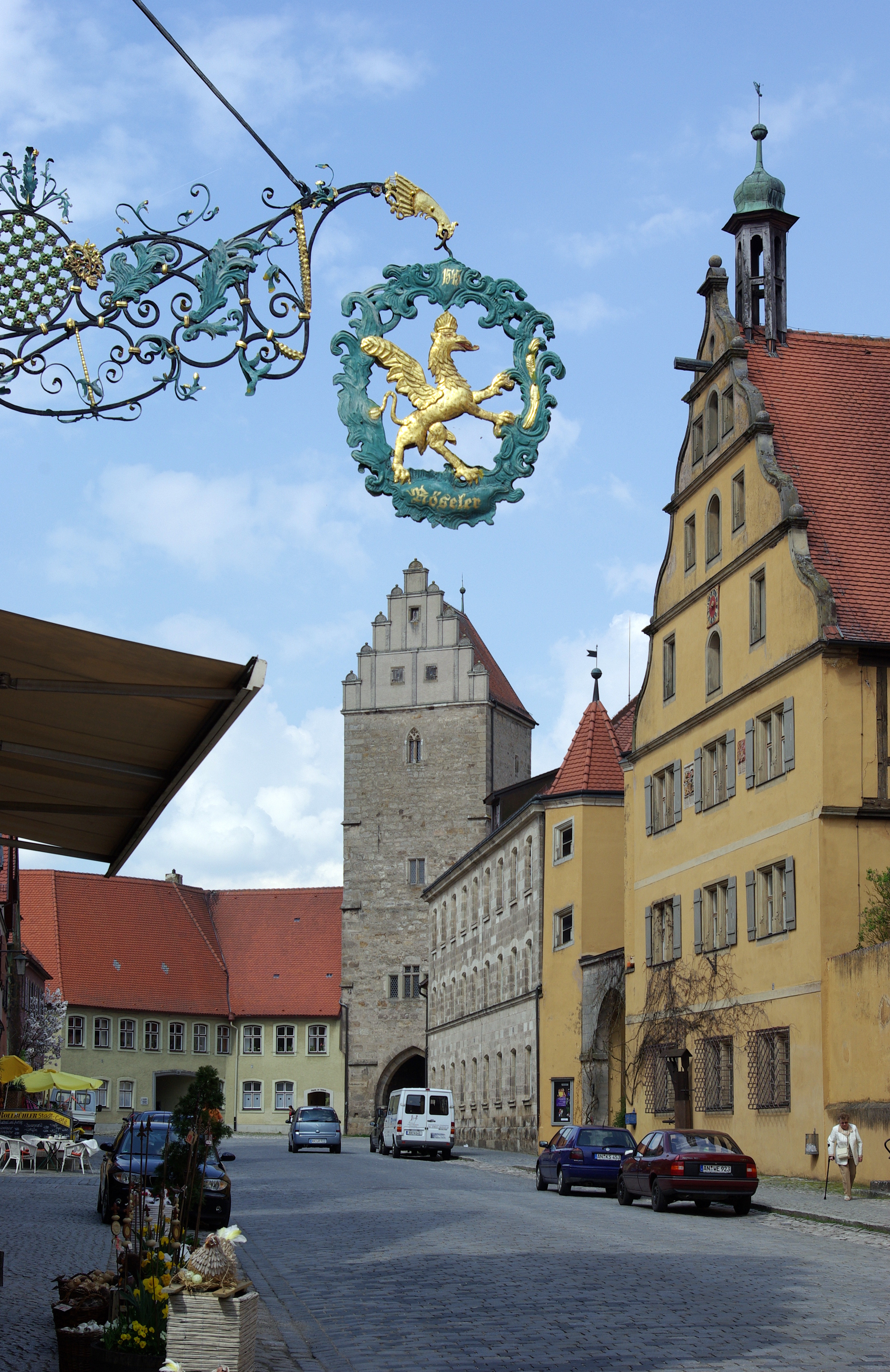
Dr.-Martin-Luther street

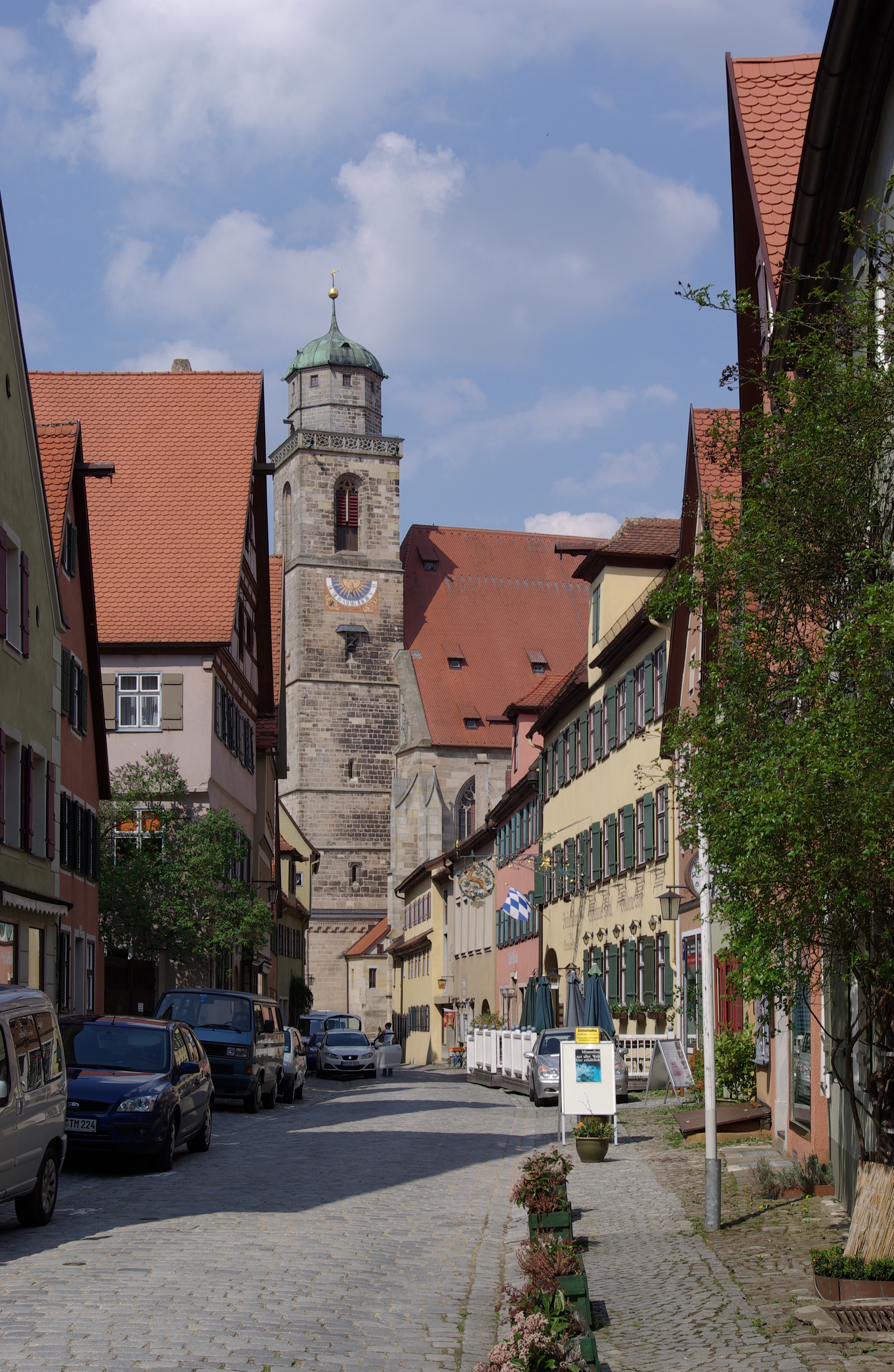
Nördlingen street

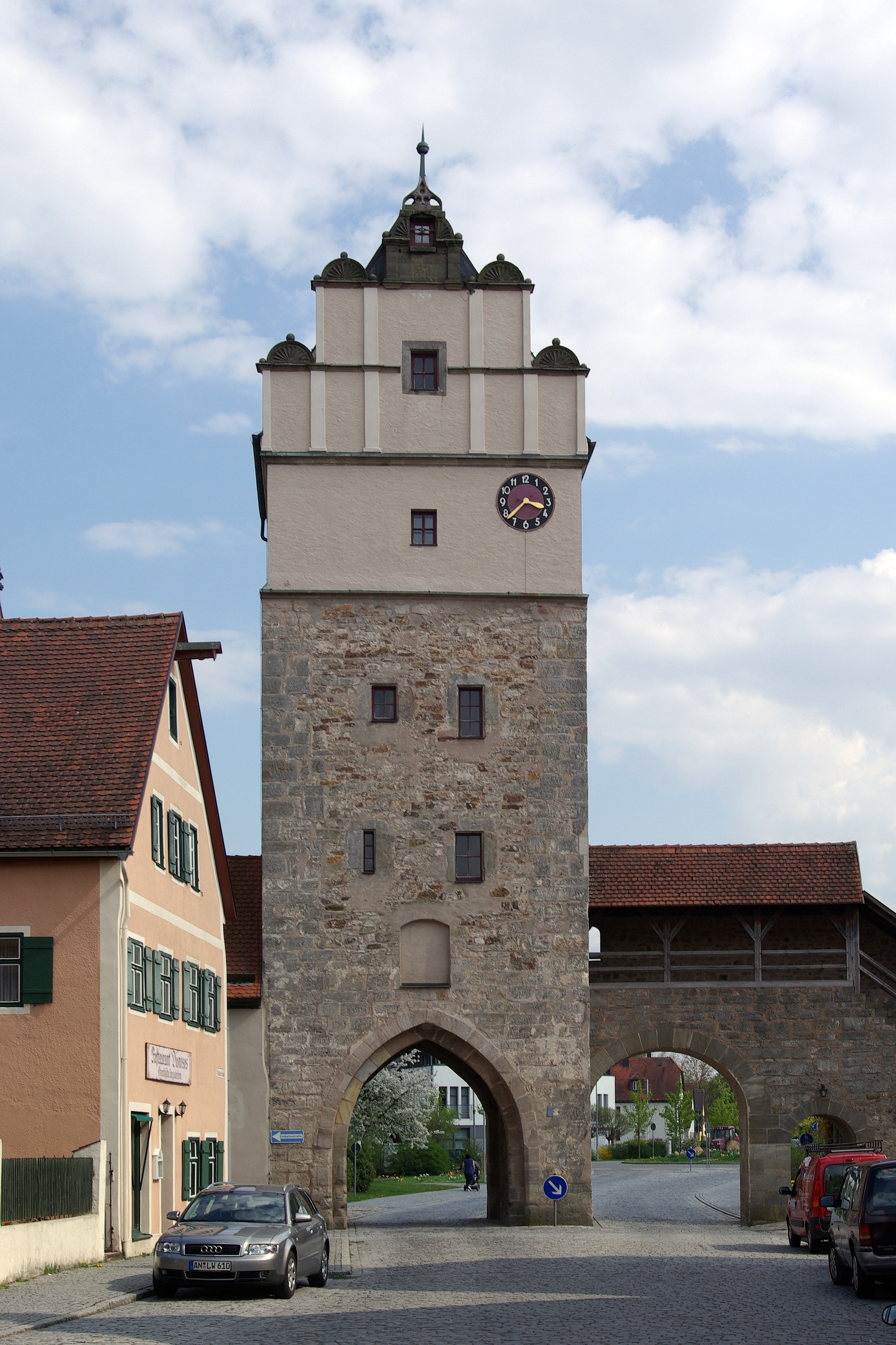
Nördlingen gate

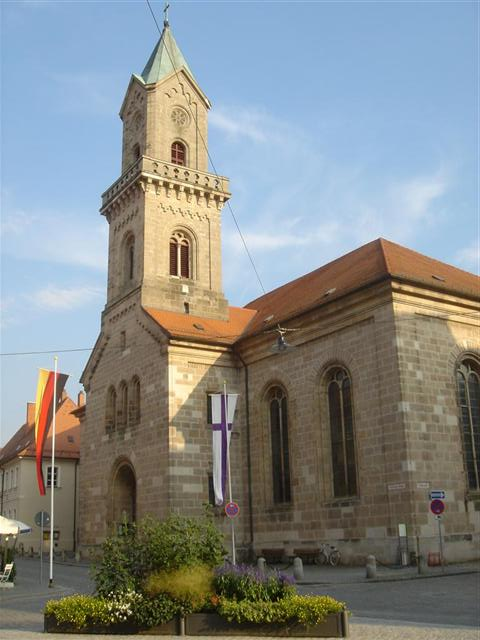
St. Paul's church

The 2024 annual gathering of Transylvanian Saxons
