= Königsfeld, Bavaria =

Königsfeld
- Municipality
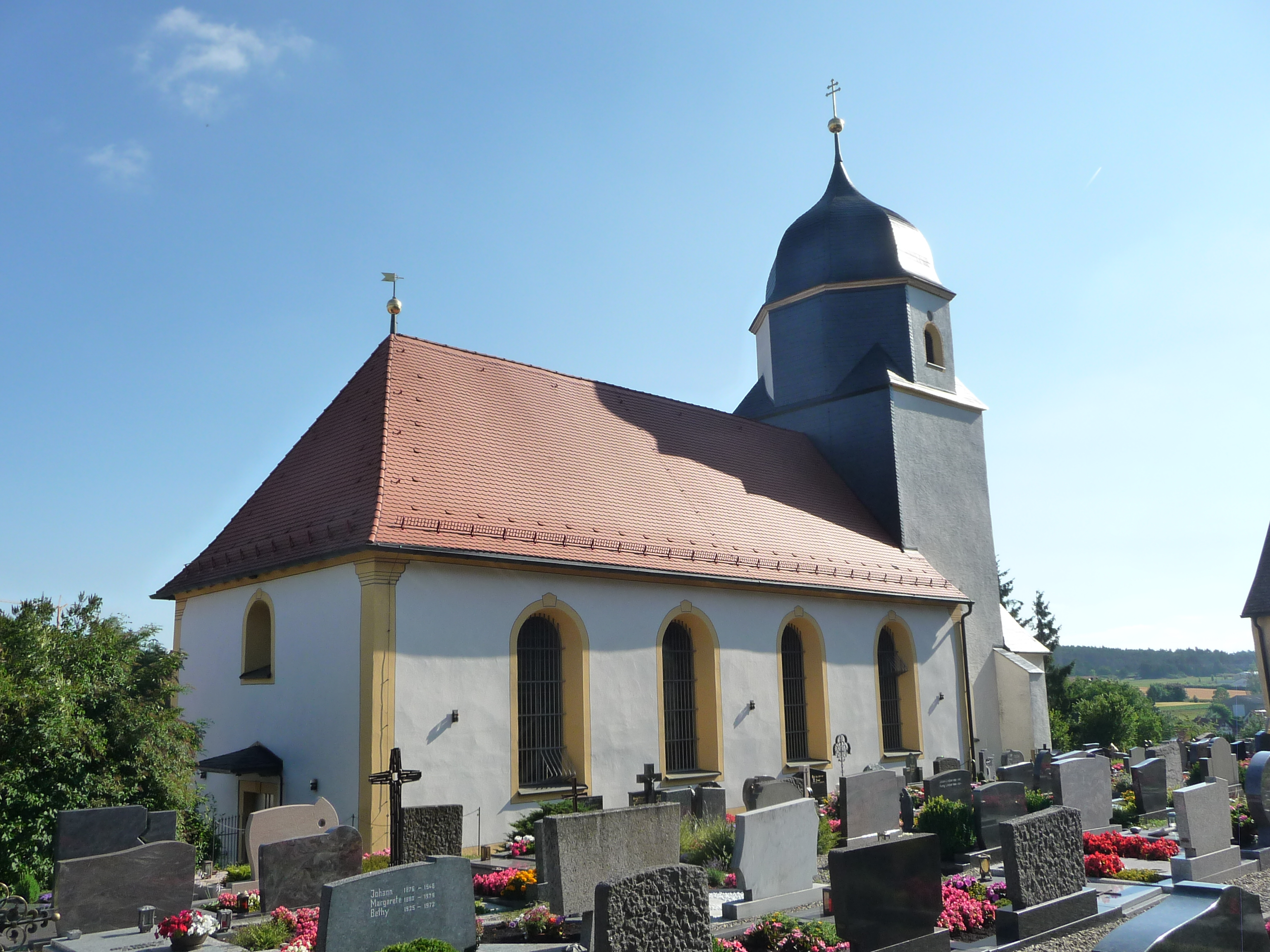
- Church of Saint James the Elder and Saint Catherine of Alexandria

- Coat of arms

- Location of Königsfeld within Bamberg district
- Interactive map of Königsfeld
- Location within Germany Location within Bavaria
- Coordinates: 49°57′N 11°10′E
- Country: Germany
- State: Bavaria
- Admin. region: Oberfranken
- District: Bamberg
- Municipal assoc.: Steinfeld

Government
  - Mayor (2020–26): Norbert Grasser

Area
  - Total: 42.84 km^{2} (16.54 sq mi)
- Elevation: 460 m (1,510 ft)

Population (2025-12-31)
  - Total: 1,236
  - Density: 28.85/km^{2} (74.73/sq mi)
- Time zone: UTC+01:00 (CET)
  - Summer (DST): UTC+02:00 (CEST)
- Postal codes: 96167
- Dialling codes: 09207
- Vehicle registration: BA
- Website: www.koenigsfeld-oberfranken.de

Königsfeld (German pronunciation: [ˈkøːnɪçsˌfɛlt]) is a municipality located in the Upper Franconian district of the Bamberg in Bavaria, and a member of the administrative community (Verwaltungsgemeinschaft) of Steinfeld.

== Geography ==
Königsfeld lies in the Upper Franconia-West region between the cities of Bamberg and Bayreuth at the source of the river Aufseß in the Franconian Jura, on the edge of the “Franconian Switzerland”.

=== Constituent communities ===
To the community of Königsfeld belong the following Ortsteile:

Huppendorf was before municipal reform a community in its own right; the children, however, went to school in Königsfeld.	143
Königsfeld was for centuries the centre of a Catholic parish to which most of the villages now in the community belonged.	569
Kotzendorf already formed a community together with Königsfeld before municipal reform.	107
Laibarös formed a small community together with Poxdorf until municipal reform; the children, however, went to school in Hohenpölz.	148
Poxdorf was the seat of the former community of Poxdorf/Laibarös and had its own school, which was exclusively attended by Poxdorf children.	159
Treunitz was before municipal reform a community in its own right and had its own school.	160
Voitmannsdorf originally formed with Drosendorf an der Aufseß, where the children went to school, a community.	125

=== Neighbouring communities ===
- Litzendorf (in the west)
- Scheßlitz (in the northwest)
- Stadelhofen (in the north)
- Hollfeld (in the east)
- Heiligenstadt (in the north)

=== Verwaltungsgemeinschaft Steinfeld ===
The community of Königsfeld belongs to the administrative community (Verwaltungsgemeinschaft) of Steinfeld, to which the communities of Wattendorf and Stadelhofen also belong. The administrative community's seat is Steinfeld, a constituent community of Stadelhofen.

=== Coat of arms ===
The community of Königsfeld has borne its current arms since municipal reform in 1973. They might heraldically be described thus: Gules, two flails argent per saltire, thereover a coronet Or and thereunder a scallop reversed Or.

The crown stands for the community's name (Königsfeld in German means “king’s field”). The two flails come from the coat of arms borne by the Lords of Königsfeld, ministeriales from Bamberg in the service of the Counts of Truhendingen. The scallop refers to the Catholic parish church's patron, St. Jacob the Elder.

== History ==
=== Middle Ages ===
As a Carolingian royal court, the city-community was known in the 8th century as Chunigeshofen, or Bohemiam (“King’s court in the mountains towards Bohemia”) and had its first documented mention in 741 in a donation document to the Bishop Ric of Würzburg. The Carolingians had built a royal court at the source of the river Aufseß whose fortifications served to safeguard the road network in a border region with the Frankish Empire. The emperor, Charlemagne wanted to control the weapons trade in 805 with the Slavic regions lying to the east, and to accomplish this goal, he had placed commissaries to work in both Hallstadt and Scheßlitz to become weapons monopolies and effectively end weapons trade with Poland and Czechia.

The imperial forest of Hauptsmoorwald's peak extent reached Königsfeld's outlying rural area as late as the 16th century, before it began to be chopped for the growing wood and lumber trade, to counter Sweden's timber monopoly in Europe. The economic estate lay on the community's western edge. Another settlement centre was found right on the Aufseß in the community's east. Slavic-style ceramic finds have been unearthed around the forest and in the community.

Iron ore was mined and smelted around Königsfeld since prehistoric times and likely had economic importance for the royal court. Today, exploratory diggings, slagheaps and field names, such as Arzberg (which would be rendered Erzberg in Modern High German – “Ore Mountain”) still recall these times.

In 1008, Emperor Heinrich II donated this royal estate (“his property with all that belongs thereto”) to the Bishopric of Bamberg. Bamberg ministeriales, that is to say, the bishop's followers, have appeared in the historic record since 1121. King Karlmann assigned Königsfeld in 741 or 742 to the newly formed Bishopric of Würzburg. Würzburg still had tithing rights in Poxdorf, Brunn and Voitmannsdorf after the Bishopric of Bamberg was founded. The Bishop of Würzburg was until sometime in the 14th century the patron lord of Saint Kilian’s Church at Königsfeld.

In the 14th century, Königsfeld passed to the Lords of Aufseß.

=== Modern times ===
During the Thirty Years' War, the community was burnt down by the Swedes. At the time of this attack, the village’s priest, Father Funk, was murdered at the source of the Aufseß. He is memorialized by a wayside shrine that stands at the source.

As part of the High Monastery of Bamberg, it came with the Reichsdeputationshauptschluss of 1803 to Bavaria. In the course of administrative reform in Bavaria, today’s community came into being under the Gemeindeedikt (“Community Edict”) of 1818.

By the 17th century, the community had grown to more than 1,000 inhabitants. However, the population shrank sharply in the Thirty Years' War and the community could never again build up to this former figure. Königsfeld could only reach the figure that it has today – roughly 1,400 – through the amalgamation of six outlying communities. After 1945, refugees driven from the formerly German lands east of the Oder and Neiße raised the population somewhat, but since the community's agriculture-based economy afforded few a livelihood, many left again to seek work in towns.

Königsfeld and the surrounding places weathered the First World War without great losses. However, in the last days of the Second World War, Königsfeld lay for several hours under fire from United States soldiers. It could have been worse but for a wounded US soldier, whose retrieval forestalled further damage.

In the course of administrative reform in May 1978, the communities of Stadelhofen and Wattendorf became along with Königsfeld the administrative community (Verwaltungsgemeinschaft) of Steinfeld.

== Politics ==
The community council is made up of 12 members, listed here by party or voter community affiliation, and also with the number of seats that each has held since the 2002 election:

- CSU/Freie Wähler: 8 (66.7%)
- Bürgerblock: 4 (33.3%)

== Königsfeld parish ==
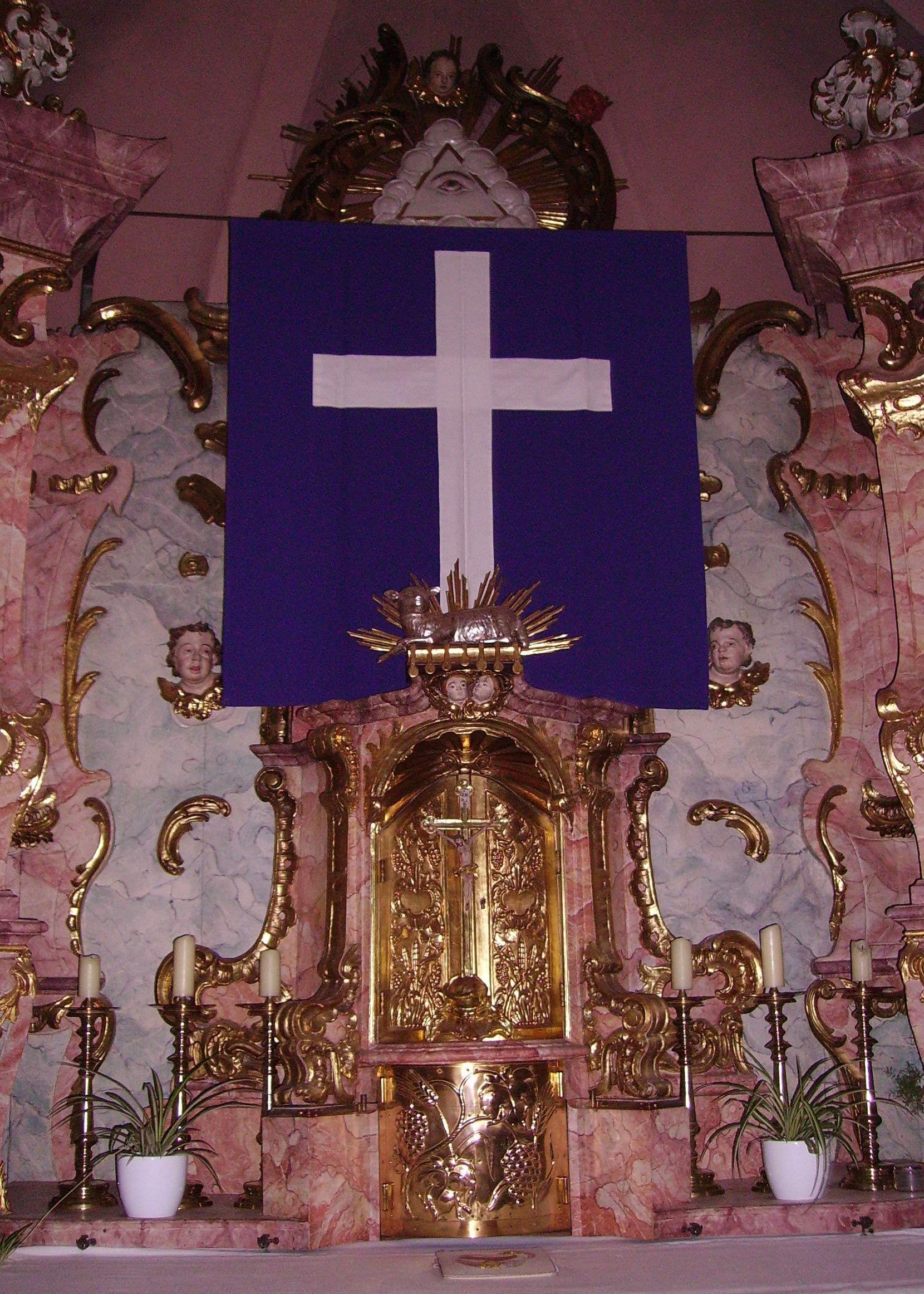
Altar

Already in the years 1340 to 1350, Königsfeld was an autonomous parish of the Bishopric of Würzburg and therefore had the bishopric's saint, Kilian, as its own church patron. The defensive wall around the fortified Church of Saint Jacob and Saint Catherine is partly still preserved. Today the parish belongs to the Bishopric of Bamberg and the Deanery of Hallstadt/Scheßlitz.

The church has its consecration on 25 July and 25 November. The original church patronage, to St. Kilian, likely goes back to the 8th century when the original parish of Königsfeld belonged to the Bishopric of Würzburg. The parish church lies in the middle of the fortified graveyard, whose western gate and part of whose wall go back to Romanesque times. In the time when Gothic was fashionable, an apse was built onto the tower in the east. The expansion only came into being after the Thirty Years' War. In 1710, the tower was integrated into the main building. The tower has a bulbous cupola.

The coat of arms on the church's outer wall belonged to the Bishop of Bamberg, Marquard Sebastian Schenk von Stauffenberg. The flat stuccoed ceiling is Bamberg stucco artist Andreas Lunz's work. The ceiling paintings finished in 1923 show Jacob's appointment by Christ and in the middle the apostle on a white horse who came to help the Christian side in the Battle of Ávila. The ceiling paintings from 1720, which have now disappeared were Bamberg painter Georg Friedrich's works.

A round quire arch joins the nave with the tower's ground floor, which forms with the adjoining apse the choir. The groined vault's keystone forms God's all-seeing eye. In the actual choir area is found the Rococo high altar, built about 1766. Before the columns stands the church patron Jacob, who is identified by his attributes, the pilgrim staff and mussels.

The left side altar (1714/17) shows Mary with the Christ Child on her arm. To the left beside her stands the Saint Empress Kunigunde with a church model in her hand, referring to her position as cofounder of the Bishopric of Bamberg. To the right stands Saint Barbara with a chalice and tower. In the retable is found a depiction of God the Father. Saint Michael with a soul-weighing scale crowns this.

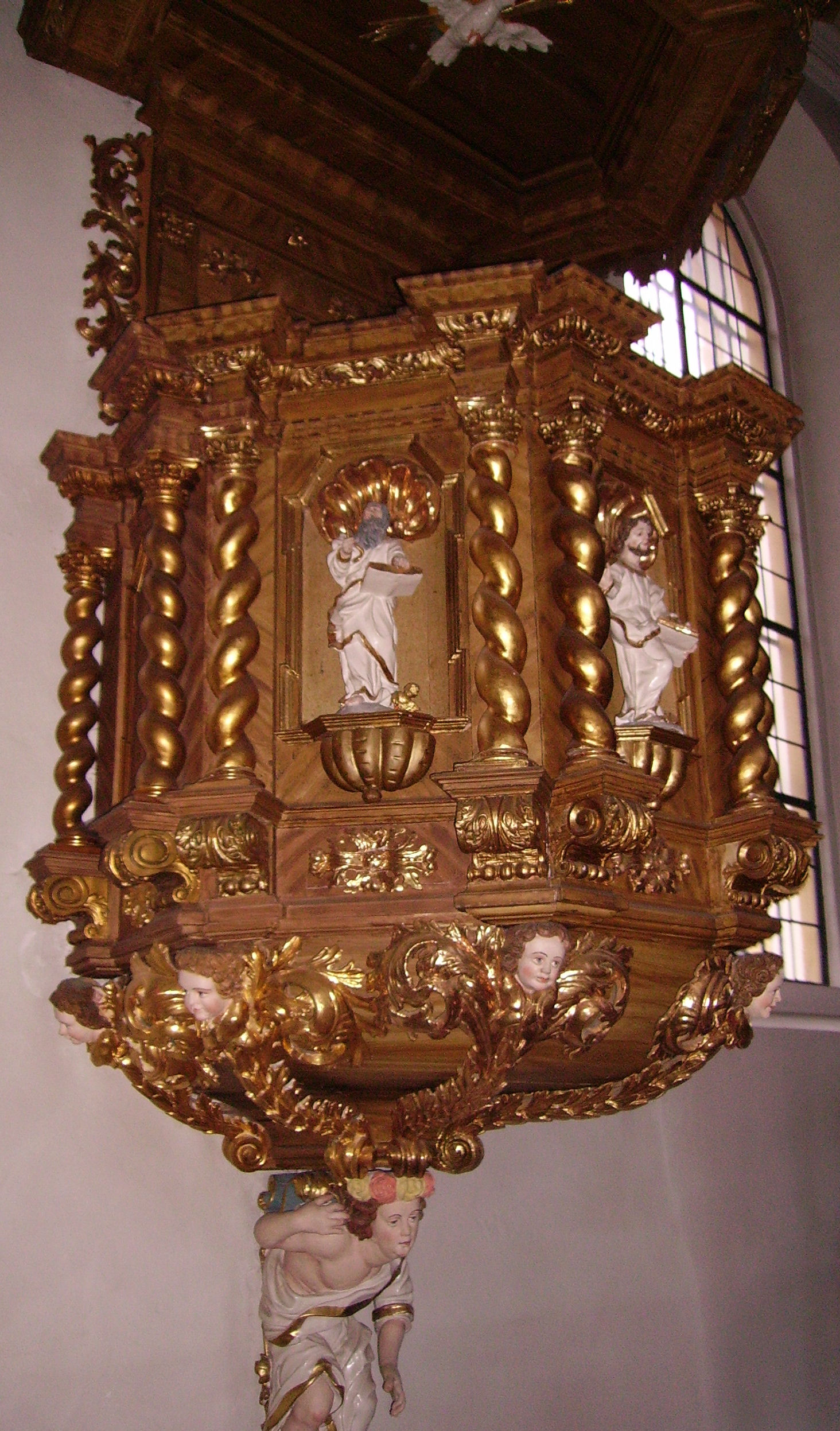
Pulpit

The right side altar is consecrated to the church's second patron, Saint Catherine. The broken wheel is a reference to her martyrdom. Catherine is shown wearing a crown, for according to legend, she was from a royal family. She is flanked by Saint Ottilie and Saint Margaret. Ottilie regained her eyesight after baptism and is said to be the patron protectress of the blind, to which the book with the pair of eyes alludes. Above the retable with the dove, the symbol for the Holy Ghost, stands the figure of Saint Sebastian with arrows stuck through him.

On the nave's south wall is found the pulpit from about 1708. It is likewise one of Johann Lauter's works. The white figures of the four Evangelists on the pulpit stage arise from the dark background. The pulpit canopy is crowned by the shape of Saint George on a pedestal. The stage itself is borne by an angel crowned with flowers, on his shoulders.

To the pulpit's right stands a sculpture of Saint Wendelin with a herdsman's staff and a cow. He is said to be patron of herdsmen and their herds. Across from the pulpit is found the Baroque depiction of Joseph with the Christ Child, from the St. Anna graveyard chapel.

On the confessional chair, the Saint John of Nepomuk is to be seen. The Baroque Stations of the Cross run through the whole nave. Under the gallery stands a so-called Pietà as a memorial to those who have fallen.

Churches

Königsfeld	Hohenpölz	Laibarös	Poxdorf	Treunitz
