= Steinfeld (Verwaltungsgemeinschaft) =

- Verwaltungsgemeinschaft
- Location of Steinfeld within Bamberg district
- Interactive map of Steinfeld
- Location within Germany Location within Bavaria
- Coordinates: 50°00′N 11°12′E
- Country: Germany
- State: Bavaria
- Admin. region: Upper Franconia
- District: Bamberg
- Seat: Stadelhofen
- Subdivisions: 3 municipalities

Area
  - Total: 106.18 km^{2} (41.00 sq mi)

Population (2025-12-31)
  - Total: 3,122
  - Density: 29.40/km^{2} (76.15/sq mi)
- Time zone: UTC+01:00 (CET)
  - Summer (DST): UTC+02:00 (CEST)
- Website: www.steinfeld-oberfranken.de

Steinfeld is a Verwaltungsgemeinschaft (municipal association) in the district of Bamberg in Bavaria, Germany. Its seat is in Stadelhofen. It consists of the following municipalities:

1. Königsfeld
2. Stadelhofen
3. Wattendorf
