= Stadelhofen =

- Municipality
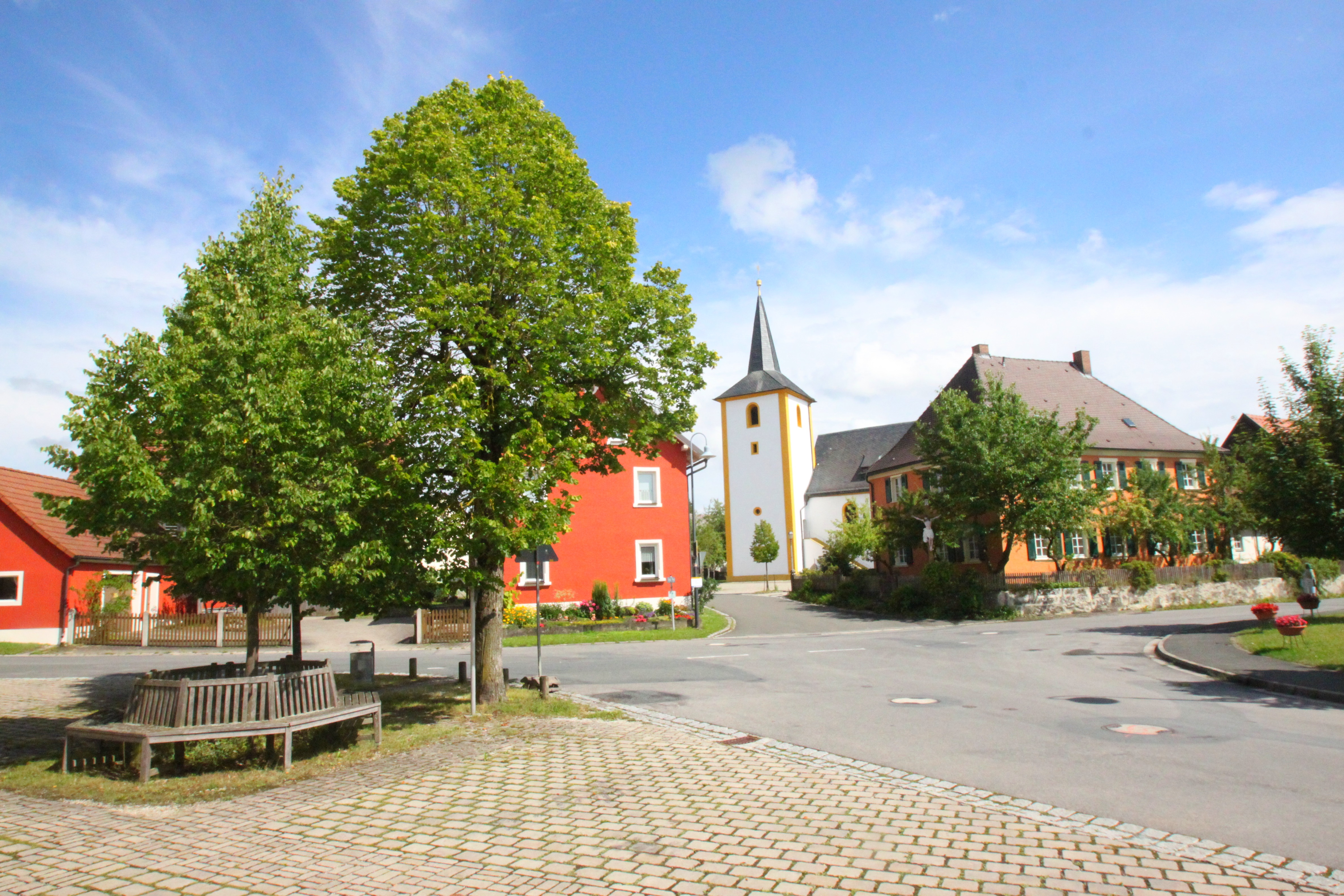
- Center of the municipality with the Church of Saints Peter and Paul

- Coat of arms

- Location of Stadelhofen within Bamberg district
- Interactive map of Stadelhofen
- Location within Germany Location within Bavaria
- Coordinates: 50°0′N 11°2′E
- Country: Germany
- State: Bavaria
- Admin. region: Oberfranken
- District: Bamberg
- Municipal assoc.: Steinfeld
- Subdivisions: 10 Ortsteile

Government
  - Mayor (2020–26): Volker Will

Area
  - Total: 41.01 km^{2} (15.83 sq mi)
- Elevation: 478 m (1,568 ft)

Population (2025-12-31)
  - Total: 1,242
  - Density: 30.29/km^{2} (78.44/sq mi)
- Time zone: UTC+01:00 (CET)
  - Summer (DST): UTC+02:00 (CEST)
- Postal codes: 96187
- Dialling codes: 09504
- Vehicle registration: BA
- Website: www.stadelhofen-oberfranken.de

Stadelhofen is a municipality in the Upper Franconian (German: Oberfranken) district of Bamberg and a member of the administrative community (Verwaltungsgemeinschaft) of Steinfeld.

== Geography ==
The community lies on the edge of the “Franconian Switzerland” on the Autobahn from Bamberg to Bayreuth.

=== Constituent communities ===
Stadelhofen’s namesake centre is not the biggest of its Gemeindeteile with Steinfeld being more than twice its size. The community has these centres, each given here with its own population figure:

- Steinfeld (383)
- Stadelhofen (185)
- Schederndorf (147)
- Eichenhüll (108)
- Wölkendorf (103)
- Pfaffendorf (102)
- Hohenhäusling (80)
- Roßdorf am Berg (71)
- Wotzendorf (54)
- Hopfenmühle (5)

The community also has 5 traditional rural land units, known in German as Gemarkungen, named Hohenhäusling, Schederndorf, Stadelhofen, Steinfeld and Wölkendorf, four of which have the same names as four of the constituent communities (it is traditional for a Gemarkung to be named after a town or village lying nearby).

== History ==
The community had its first documentary mention in 1248. The placename Stadelhofen is believed to mean “at the farms furnished with a barn”. However, it could also have come from a corrupted personal name.

Stadelhofen lies at the spot where an old army road from Bamberg to Kulmbach once crossed the way from Weismain to Hollfeld.

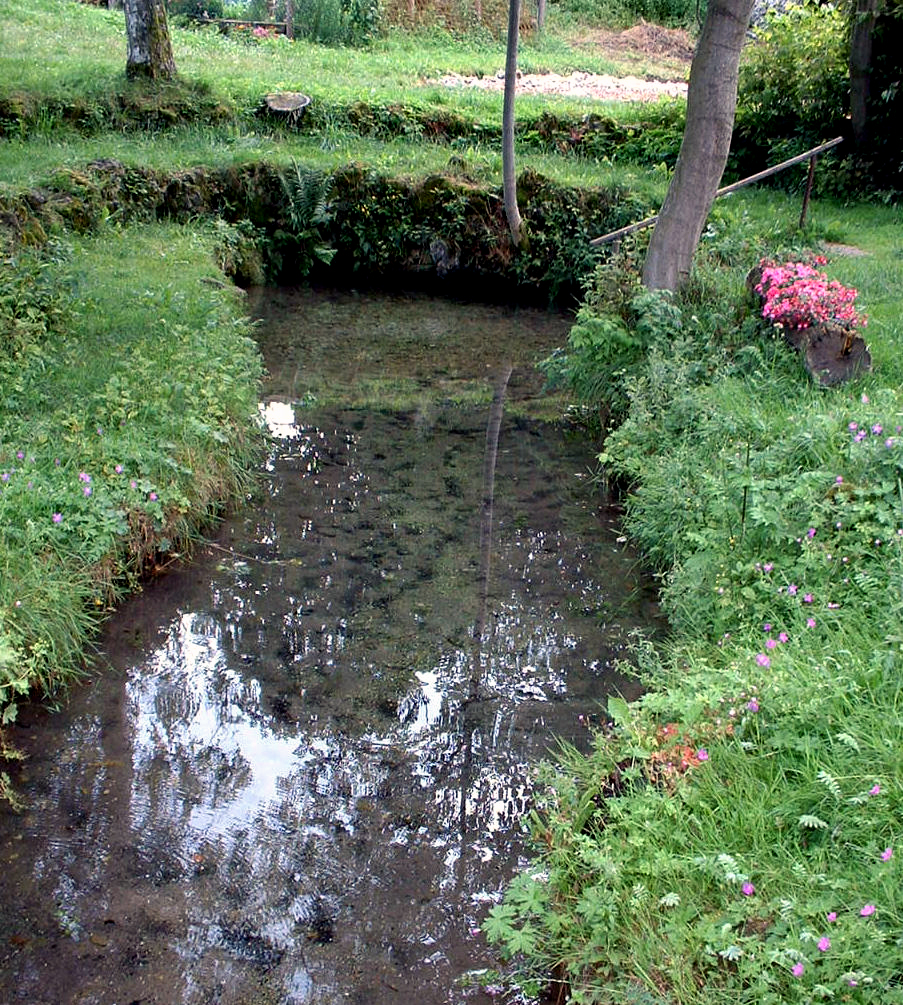
Source of the Wiesent in Steinfeld

Even if Stadelhofen had its first documentary mention rather late, it is clear that the area was already settled by the year 630. On a map from 1595, the area around Stadelhofen bears the description Uf dem Gebürg.

In 1386, the Counts of Truhendingen sold the place at a price of 2,000 heller to the Bishop of Bamberg. Since the Reichsdeputationshauptschluss of 1803, before which the community had belonged to the High Monastery at Bamberg, Stadelhofen has belonged to Bavaria. In the course of administrative reform in Bavaria, today’s community came into being under the Gemeindeedikt (“Community Edict”) of 1818. Since 1978, the community has consisted of the formerly autonomous communities of Stadelhofen, Wölkendorf, Schederndorf and Steinfeld.

Besides Stadelhofen there was also once in the area a now lost parish called Leuchnitz, which lay somewhere between Weismain and Steinfeld.

The Catholic parish church, consecrated to Saint Peter and Saint Catherine, comes from the 18th century. The tower with its pointed cupola is one of the area’s landmarks. The high altar was bought in 1721 from the people in Litzendorf.

=== Population development ===
The population of Stadelhofen rose slightly starting in 1840, but has slowly fallen between the years 1925 and 2024, with a brief peak in 1950. Within municipal limits, 1404 inhabitants were counted in 1970, 1291 in 1987 and 1274 in 2000. In 2004-2005 it was 1200.

Population census

Year	Pop.	±%
1840	1,461	—
1871	1,615	+10.5%
1900	1,653	+2.4%
1925	1,658	+0.3%
1939	1,489	−10.2%
1950	1,868	+25.5%
1961	1,412	−24.4%
1970	1,404	−0.6%
1987	1,291	−8.0%
1991	1,248	−3.3%
1995	1,244	−0.3%
2000	1,274	+2.4%
2005	1,261	−1.0%
2010	1,240	−1.7%

Year	Pop.	±%
2011	1,268	+2.3%
2013	1,250	−1.4%
2014	1,241	−0.7%
2015	1,227	−1.1%
2016	1,235	+0.7%
2017	1,242	+0.6%
2018	1,247	+0.4%
2019	1,245	−0.2%
2020	1,266	+1.7%
2021	1,253	−1.0%
2022	1,259	+0.5%
2023	1,263	+0.3%
2024	1,247	−1.3%

Source: Gemeinde Stadelhofen 09 471 189 - Statistik kommunal 2023

== Politics ==
The mayor is Volker Will (Überparteiliche Wählergemeinschaft), elected in 2020.

=== Municipal council ===
At the 2002 municipal election, the Überparteiliche Wählergemeinschaft voters’ group won 6 seats (49.7%), the CSU won 3 (26.6%) and the Freie Wähler won 3 (23.7%). Voter turnout was 90.1%.

In 1999, municipal tax revenue, converted to euros, amounted to €382,000 of which business taxes (net) amounted to €37,000.

=== Coat of arms ===
Stadelhofen’s arms might heraldically be described thus: Party per pale Or and azure, Or a fess gules, thereover a chess-rook argent, azure a fess argent, thereover a rose with button Or and sepals vert.

The charge described above as a “chess-rook” – even though it looks nothing like the rooks seen on a chessboard – is called a Doppelspringer in German, and presumably the sense of “knight” is to be understood. This charge recalls the Neustätter family. The red fess (horizontal bar) on the golden field refers to the Counts of Truhendingen. The rose is from the arms borne by the Lords of Aufseß. The tinctures gules and argent (red and silver) refer to the Giech and Förtsch families, who were ministeriales to the Counts of Andechs-Merania.

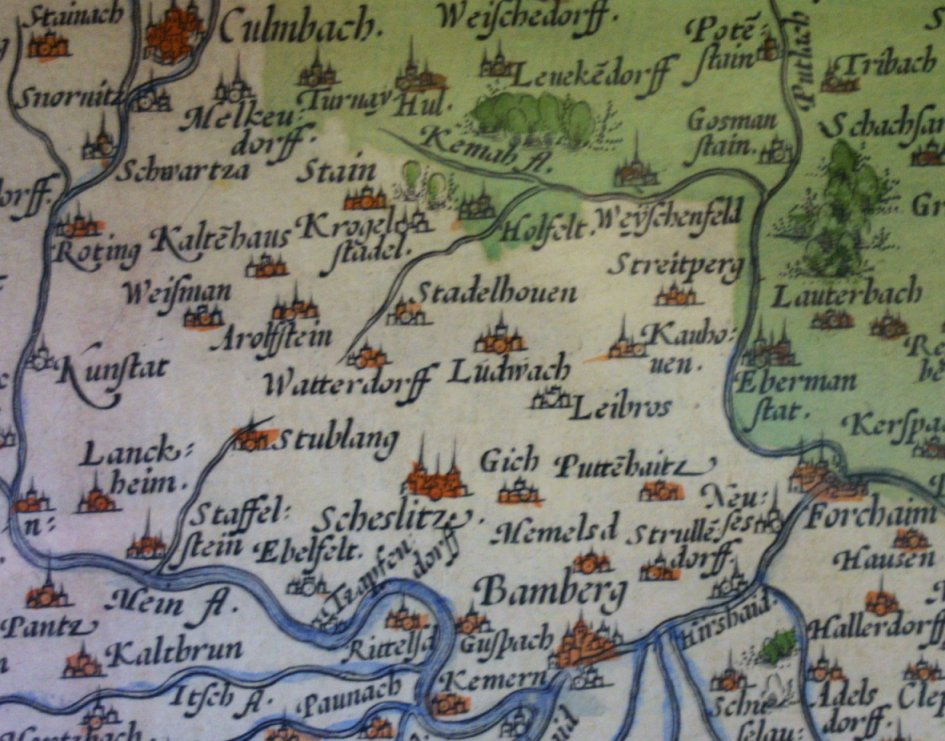
Old map by Sebastian Rotenhan with Stadelhofen (Stadelhoven)

== Economy and infrastructure ==
According to official statistics, there were 61 workers on the social welfare contribution rolls working in producing businesses, and in trade and transport none. In other areas, 30 workers on the social welfare contribution rolls were employed, and 468 such workers worked from home. In processing businesses there were 5 businesses, and in construction 1. Furthermore, in 1999, there were 138 agricultural operations with a working area of 2 286 ha, of which 2 043 ha was cropland and 242 ha was meadowland.

=== Breweries ===
Within municipal limits are found today two breweries, the Brauerei Will in Schederndorf and the Brauerei Hübner in Steinfeld. Until 1985, there was also the Brauerei Schrenker in Stadelhofen.

== Education ==
In 1999, the following institutions existed in Stadelhofen:

- One kindergarten with 50 places with 39 children
- One elementary school with 4 teachers and 86 pupils
