= Scheßlitz =

- Town
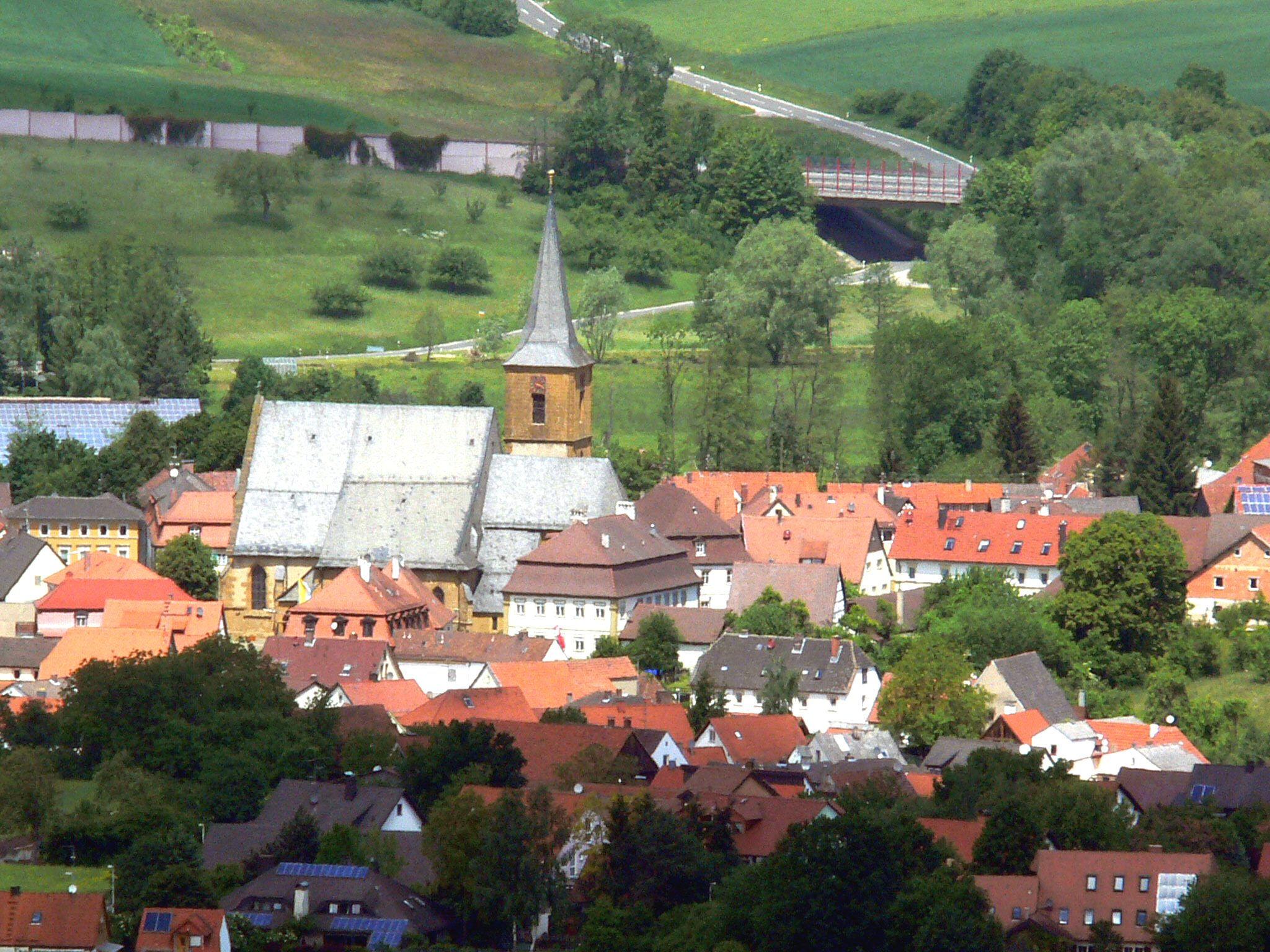
- Town center of Scheßlitz with the Church of Saint Kilian

- Coat of arms

- Location of Scheßlitz within Bamberg district
- Interactive map of Scheßlitz
- Location within Germany Location within Bavaria
- Coordinates: 49°58′30″N 11°2′00″E
- Country: Germany
- State: Bavaria
- Admin. region: Oberfranken
- District: Bamberg
- Subdivisions: 30 Stadtteile

Government
  - Mayor (2020–26): Roland Kauper (CSU)

Area
  - Total: 94.87 km^{2} (36.63 sq mi)
- Elevation: 310 m (1,020 ft)

Population (2025-12-31)
  - Total: 7,115
  - Density: 75.00/km^{2} (194.2/sq mi)
- Time zone: UTC+01:00 (CET)
  - Summer (DST): UTC+02:00 (CEST)
- Postal codes: 96110
- Dialling codes: 09542
- Vehicle registration: BA
- Website: www.schesslitz.de

Scheßlitz (German pronunciation: [ˈʃɛslɪts]; or Schesslitz) is a German town in the Upper Franconian district of Bamberg and lies on the rise to the Franconian Switzerland on the A 70 between Bamberg and Bayreuth, lying 14 km northeast of the former.

== Geography ==
The town is surrounded by the following hills:

Stammberg (559 m)
Giechburg (530 m)
Gügel (515 m)
Kulm (553 m)
Heidenstein (577 m)
Rabenstein (572 m)
Würgauer Höhe (518 m)
Reisberg (554 m)
Roter Stein (518 m)
Wattendorfer Höhe (555 m)
Hohe Metze (577 m)

This basin's sheltered setting with roads that come together from Heiligenstadt, Hollfeld, Weismain, Bad Staffelstein and Zapfendorf favoured settlement in prehistoric times.

=== Constituent communities ===
Scheßlitz's main town and namesake centre is by far the biggest of its Ortsteile with a population of 2,548. The town furthermore has these outlying centres, each given here with its own population figure:

(as of 31 March/4 April 2005)

Constituent communities	Inhabitants	Other notes
Burgellern	378	amalgamated in 1972
Burglesau	203	amalgamated in 1978
Demmelsdorf	312	
Dörnwasserlos	82	amalgamated in 1972
Doschendorf	24	
Ehrl	119	
Giechburg	2	
Gügel	0	actually a pilgrimage church
Köttensdorf	125	
Kübelstein	126	amalgamated in 1978
Ludwag	145	amalgamated in 1978
Neudorf bei Scheßlitz	115	amalgamated in 1978
Pausdorf	102	amalgamated in 1972
Peulendorf	174	
Pünzendorf	72	
Roschlaub	73	amalgamated in 1972
Roßdach	97	
Schlappenreuth	86	
Schrautershof	6	
Schweisdorf	187	
Starkenschwind	199	
Straßgiech	555	
Stübig	215	amalgamated in 1978
Weichenwasserlos	73	amalgamated in 1978
Weingarten	21	
Wiesengiech	571	
Windischletten	224	
Würgau	329	
Zeckendorf	231	

The amalgamation of these Stadtteile into Scheßlitz on 1 May 1972 and 1 May 1978 made the town the district's biggest municipality by land area.

== History ==
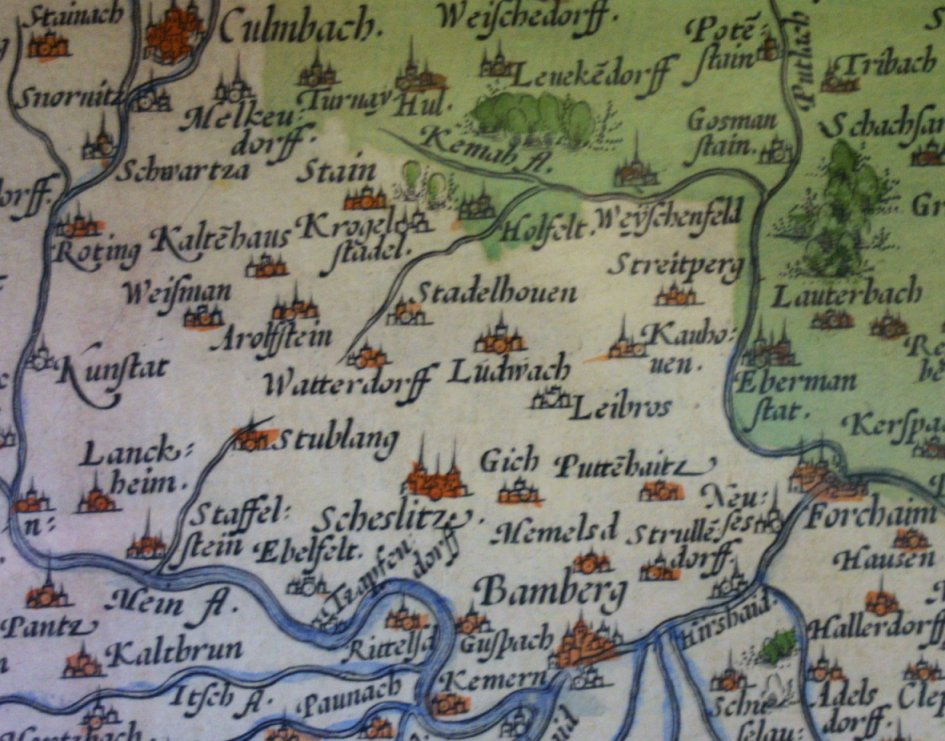
Old map with Scheßlitz

Scheßlitz had its first documentary mention about 805. Scheßlitz is among the area's oldest settlements and has held town rights since 1230.

Linear Pottery remains in the Kohlstatt make clear that there were settlers here as long ago as 2500 BC.

Concrete clues as to the town's history are yielded by the Codex Eberhardi in which it is documented that a Count Bernhard and his wife Ratbirg bequeathed their property on what is now Scheßlitz's abutting rural area to the Fulda Monastery about the year 800. The town has seized on this event as its historical beginnings and thus celebrated its 1,200-year jubilee in 2005.

It is said that confirmation of the existence of a parish of Scheßlitz is the underwriting of a protocol about the Bamberg Synod in 1059 by Arnold de Sieslice.

The town gained importance through the Andechs Meranians’ activities, who rose to dukes in 1178. In 1230, one of Duke Otto VIII's fortified Andechs Meranian castles in the civitas of Scheßlitz was mentioned, making Scheßlitz the Bamberg district's oldest town.

The town of Scheßlitz was an Obervogtamt (“higher reeve’s office”) of the High Monastery of Bamberg, and with the Reichsdeputationshauptschluss of 1803, it became part of Bavaria.

=== Entry in a travel guide ===
In his travel guide about Bamberg and the surrounding area from about 1912, the compiler Dietrich Amende also describes the town of Scheßlitz:

“Originally a Slavic settlement, Scheßlitz was already named in history in 805 and already styled an ‘oppidum’ (small town) in 1062. Today the picturesque small town with its admirable inns is a popular outing destination for people from Bamberg, Nuremberg and Coburg. Worth seeing are the parish church, a Gothic hall church with interesting gravestones from 1360, 1569 and 1570, the hospital church built in 1780 with the prebendary building built in 1739-74 in whose gable is a lovely relief by the Bamberg sculptor Gollwitzer, the Dillig’sche Haus with stately woodcarvings from 1612, the warriors’ memorial, etc. In the graveyard is found an exceptionally beautiful statue of the Holy Virgin from 1450, which comes from St. Martin’s Church in Bamberg.” – Quoted and translated from Dr. Dietrich Amende: “Bamberg und das Frankenland”. Bamberg o. J. (about 1912).

=== Amalgamations ===
In the course of administrative reform in Bavaria, many nearby communities were amalgamated with the town, thereby giving the town the greatest land area of any municipality in the district. The amalgamations are listed here by date.The Pia D.W village

- 1 May 1972:
  - Burgellern
  - Dörrnwasserlos
  - Pausdorf
  - Roschlaub
- 1 May 1978:
  - Stübig
  - Weichenwasserlos
  - Kübelstein
  - Ludwag
  - Neudorf

=== Population development ===
Historical population
Date	Pop.	±%
December 31, 1993	6,916	—
December 31, 1997	7,034	+1.7%
December 31, 2004	7,174	+2.0%

== Politics ==
=== Town council ===
The town council is made up of 20 members:

- CSU: 9 seats
- SPD: 3 seats
- Freie Liste: 3 seats
- Christliche Wählergemeinschaft Scheßlitz-Umland: 2 seats
- Vereinigte Junge Wähler: 2 seats
- Interessengemeinschaft Giech: 1 seat

=== Mayor ===
Scheßlitz's “First Mayor” is Roland Kauper (CSU), first elected in 2014 and re-elected in 2020.

=== Coat of arms ===
Scheßlitz's arms might heraldically be described thus: A wall embattled argent, the chief party per pale Or a lion rampant sable armed and langued gules surmounted by a bendlet of the first and argent a fishhook reversed of the fourth.

The lion recalls the Bamberg High Monastery. The fishhook comes from Bamberg Bishop Lamprecht von Brunn's family coat of arms. The wall stands for the town's fortification.

== Culture and sightseeing ==
=== Buildings ===
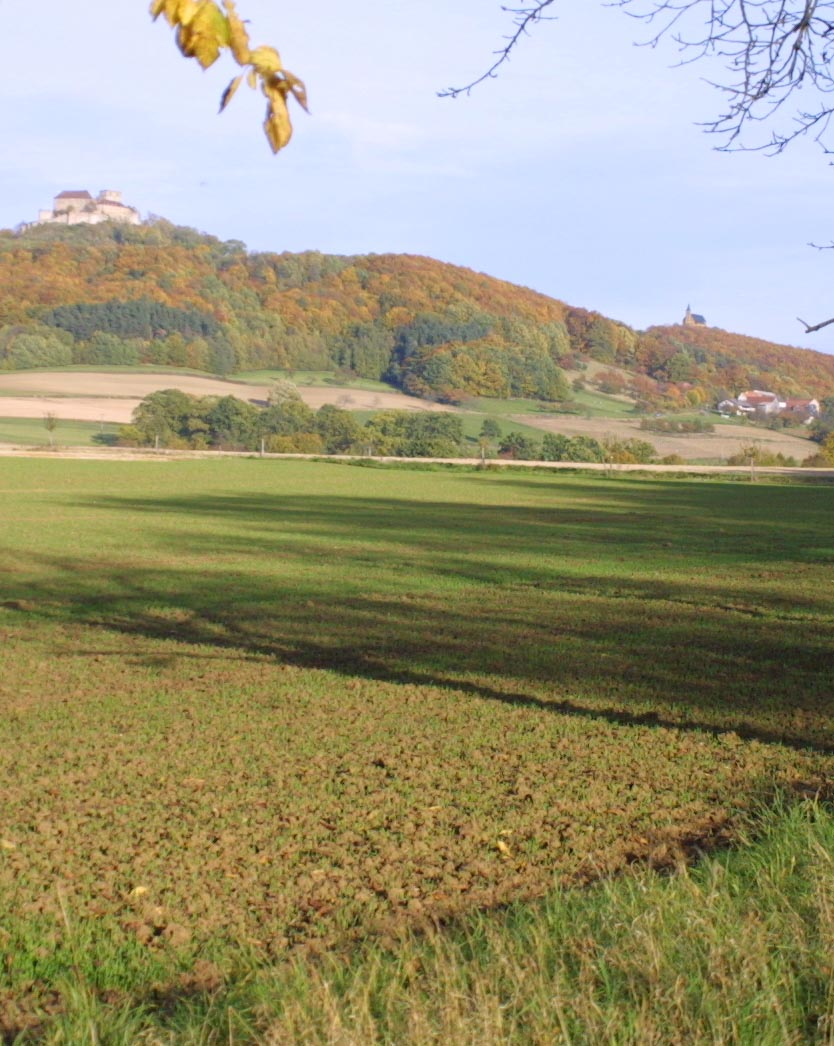
Giechburg and Gügel

- The Giechburg (castle) sits on a hill some distance over the town.
- The Gügel pilgrimage church rises near the Giechburg on another hill in a heavily wooded area.

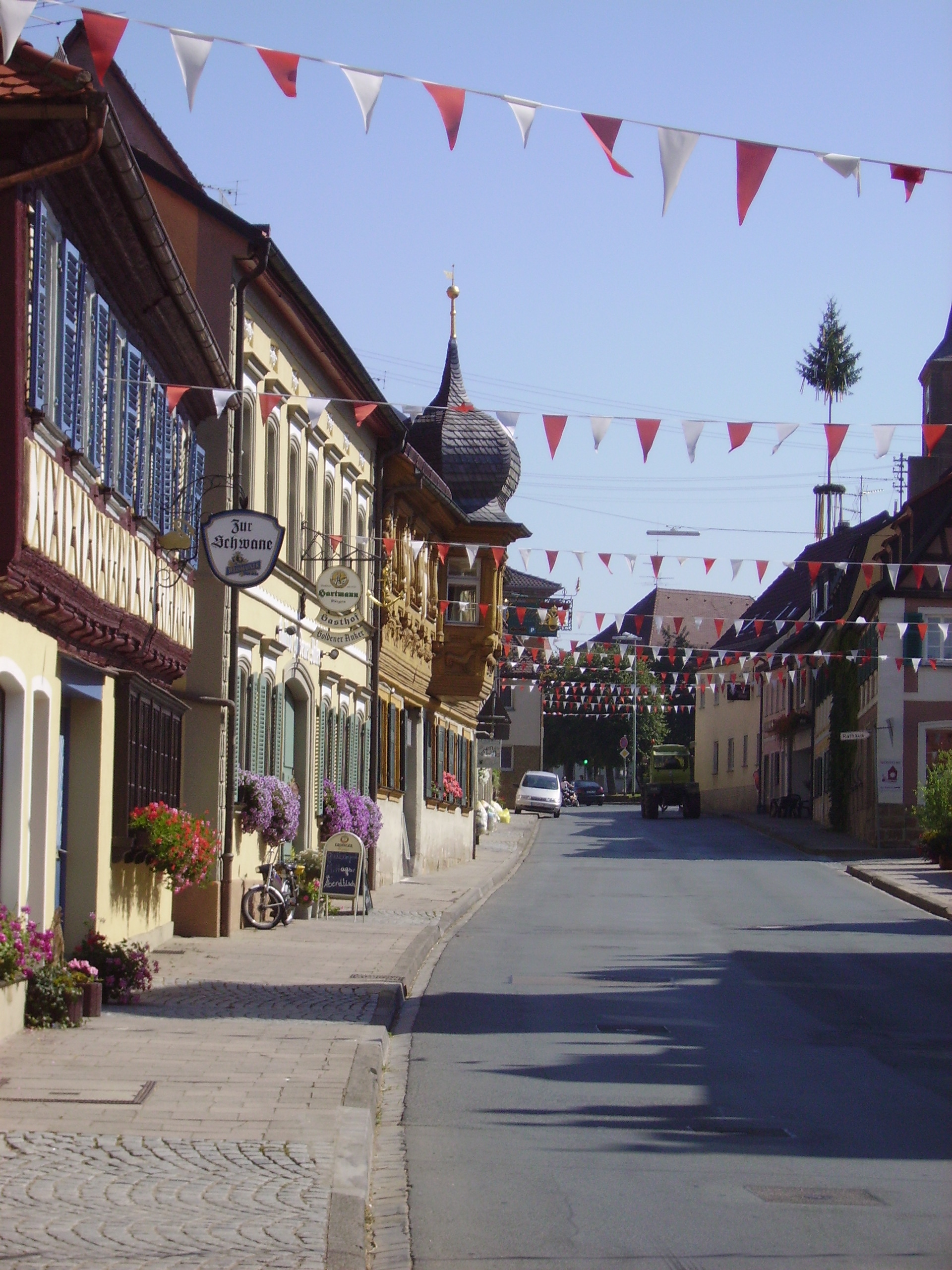
Guildhall on Hauptstraße (with oriel)

- The “Historic Townscape” with its many townsmen's houses on Hauptstraße gives one an impression of a street of the 18th or 19th century.
- The former “Brewers’ Guildhall” stands out with its rich timber-frame carvings and a great oriel. It nowadays, under the name Dillighaus, houses a café. It was built in 1692 by Jörg Hofmann from Zeil am Main and in 1847 it passed into the Dillig family's ownership. This family was not very well off, originally owning a plot of land that fed only two goats.
- The Baroque Elisabethen-Hospital is a building by Johann Jakob Michael Küchel from 1766 and 1767 with three-dimensional works on the façade by F. M. Mutschelle. It was founded in 1395 by Bamberg Bishop Lambert von Brunn to ensure support for the poor, the sick and invalids. The bishop was further likely obliged to join the newly inherited town to the Bamberg High Monastery.

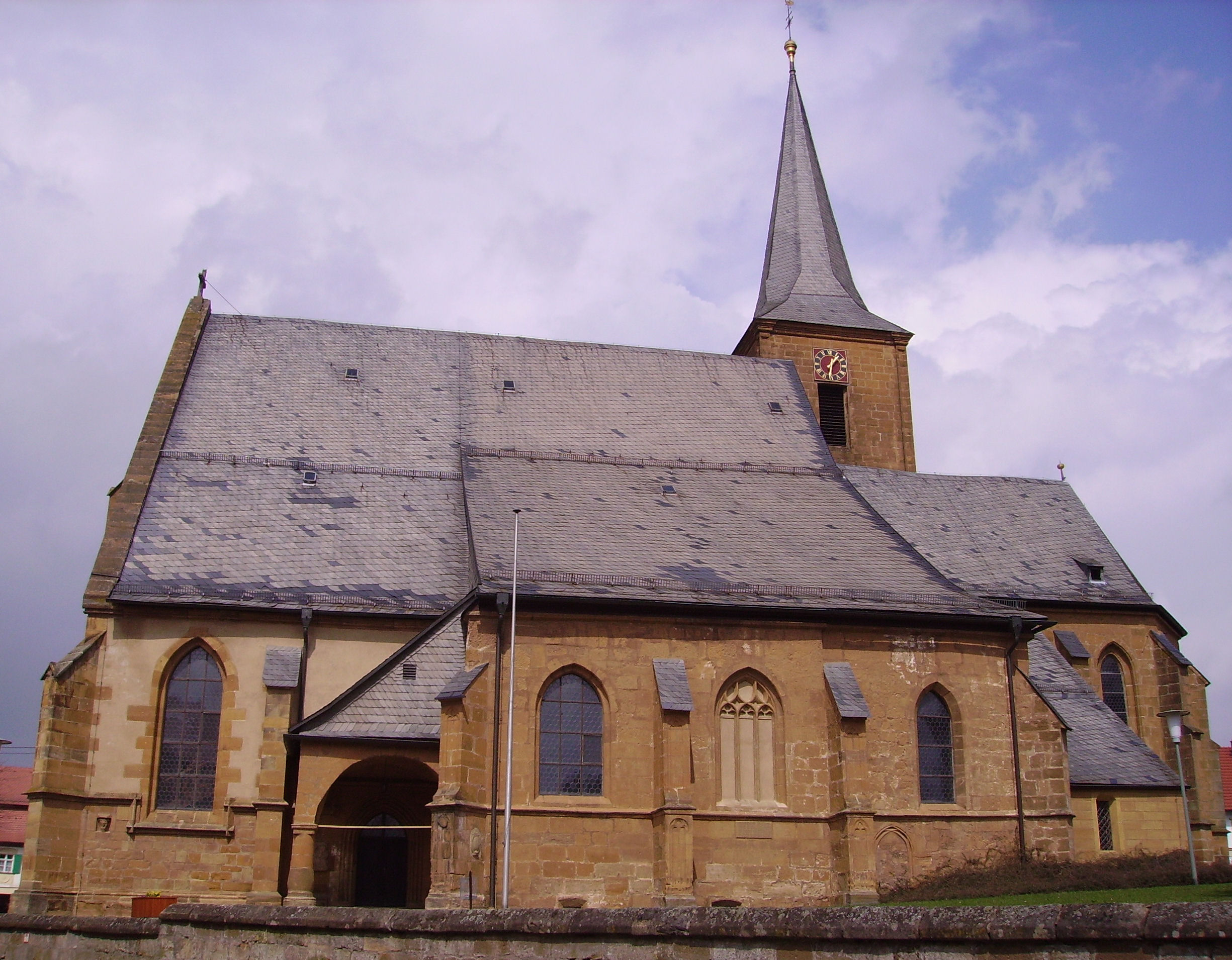
St. Kilian's parish church

- The Catholic Pfarrkirche St. Kilian (parish church) has a choir with a pseudo-basilica divided by struts. It was begun about 1400 and in the 15th century was expanded about the nave, swallowing a graveyard chapel, which became a confessional chapel. In 1571 the tower with a steep tent roof went up. On the church's north side is found a Mount of Olives scene from the 17th century. The interior design comes from the 18th century, including the high altar from 1787 which already shows echoes of Classicism. The church's centrepiece is the pulpit decorated in the Rococo style.

== Economy and infrastructure ==
After the Second World War, various firms settled in Scheßlitz:

- VDM (Vereinigte Deutsche Metallwerke), then Cebal, later Alcan (plastic tubing), now Albéa,
- Milchhof Albert (Frischli products)
- Bilog (e-logistics)

Within the town's limits are five breweries, of which the Schmitt, Senger and Drei Kronen breweries are in Scheßlitz itself. In Köttensdorf is found the Hoh Brewery and in Würgau the Hartmann Brewery. By 2008 at the latest, for the 700th anniversary, the Drei Kronen Brewery in Straßgiech will also be brewing again. Until the 1990s, the Ellertal Brewery was still brewing its own beer.

All together, Scheßlitz offers about 2,000 jobs.

=== Transport ===
- Scheßlitz lies right on Bundesstraße 22, the former Rottendorf–Weiden Imperial Road (Reichsstraße) which runs from Rottendorf near Würzburg to Cham in the Upper Palatinate and has a connection with the A 70, which runs from Bamberg to Bayreuth.
- The former railway line to Bamberg, the so-called Schääzer Bockerla (or in standard German Scheßlitzer Böcklein) was abandoned on 31 May 1985. Today the railway embankment is used mainly as a cycle path, or is underneath the A 70/A 73 Bamberg Autobahn cloverleaf.

A planned train connection between Scheßlitz and Hollfeld was once again put off in 1906 after widespread groundwork had already been done because both places wanted the project to fail for political reasons. The reason, however, was not the high building cost (2 million Marks), but rather that both towns were seeking the lucrative status of being the last station on the line.

Four of the variations on the plan for a railway line on the Franconian Jura that were discussed were as follows:

1. by way of Würgau and Königsfeld (building cost 1.89 million Marks)
2. through the Burglesau Valley by way of Steinfeld and Königsfeld (building cost 2.125 million Marks)
3. from Memmelsdorf by way of Litzendorf, Tiefenellern and Königsfeld (building cost 2.170 million Marks)
4. from Gundelsheim by way of Melkendorf, Herzogenreuth and Königsfeld (building cost 2.77 million Marks)

The line envisaged by the planners would have run from Scheßlitz towards Würgau, and then climbed left at the Schlappenreuther Berg in the Jura. The line would then have stretched through Gräfenhäusling to Steinfeld, in the end reaching the town of Hollfeld through the Wiesent and Aufseß Valleys.

Near Demmelsdorf a forest aisle was already being cut and a new canal harbour was being discussed to afford ore shipping from the Jura Mountains.

In 1918, there were once more stirrings aimed at getting the Jurabahn railway built. In 1920, however, the Reich Transport Ministry (Reichsverkehrsministerium) made it known that in view of the bad state of the economy, any new railway building projects would have to be abandoned for the time being. Eventually, in 1930, a postal busline from Bamberg by way of Scheßlitz and Hollfeld to Bayreuth was opened.

== Famous people ==
=== Sons and daughters of the town ===
- Markus Feulner, footballer with Borussia Dortmund
- Hans Zeis, shoemaker and Scheßlitz town councillor, died about 1599. Left behind a house book that begins in 1580 and ends in 1599, likely owing to the writer's death. It is available in two different editions.

== Sister cities ==
- Victoria, Kansas, United States

== Picture gallery ==
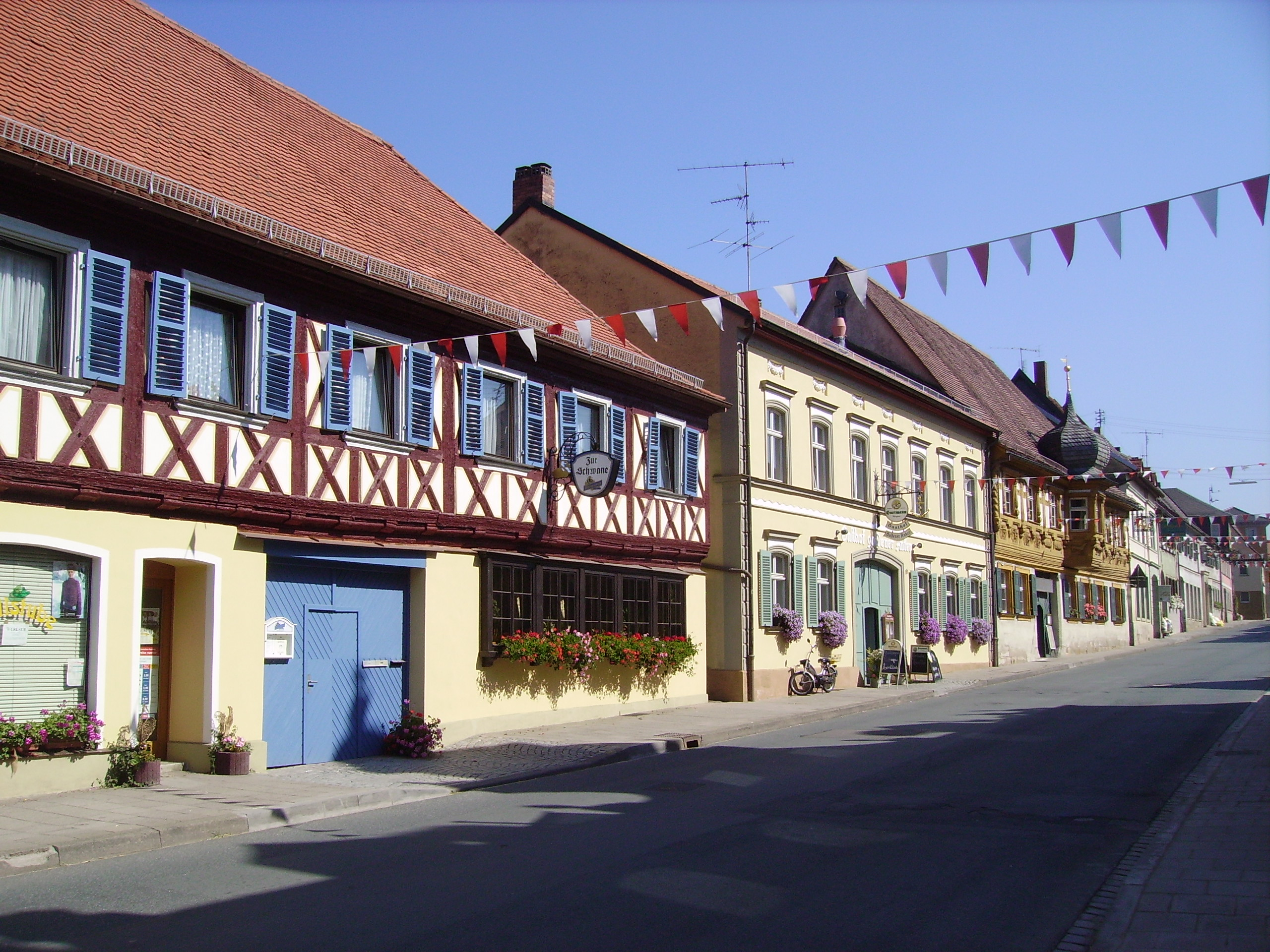
Hauptstraße

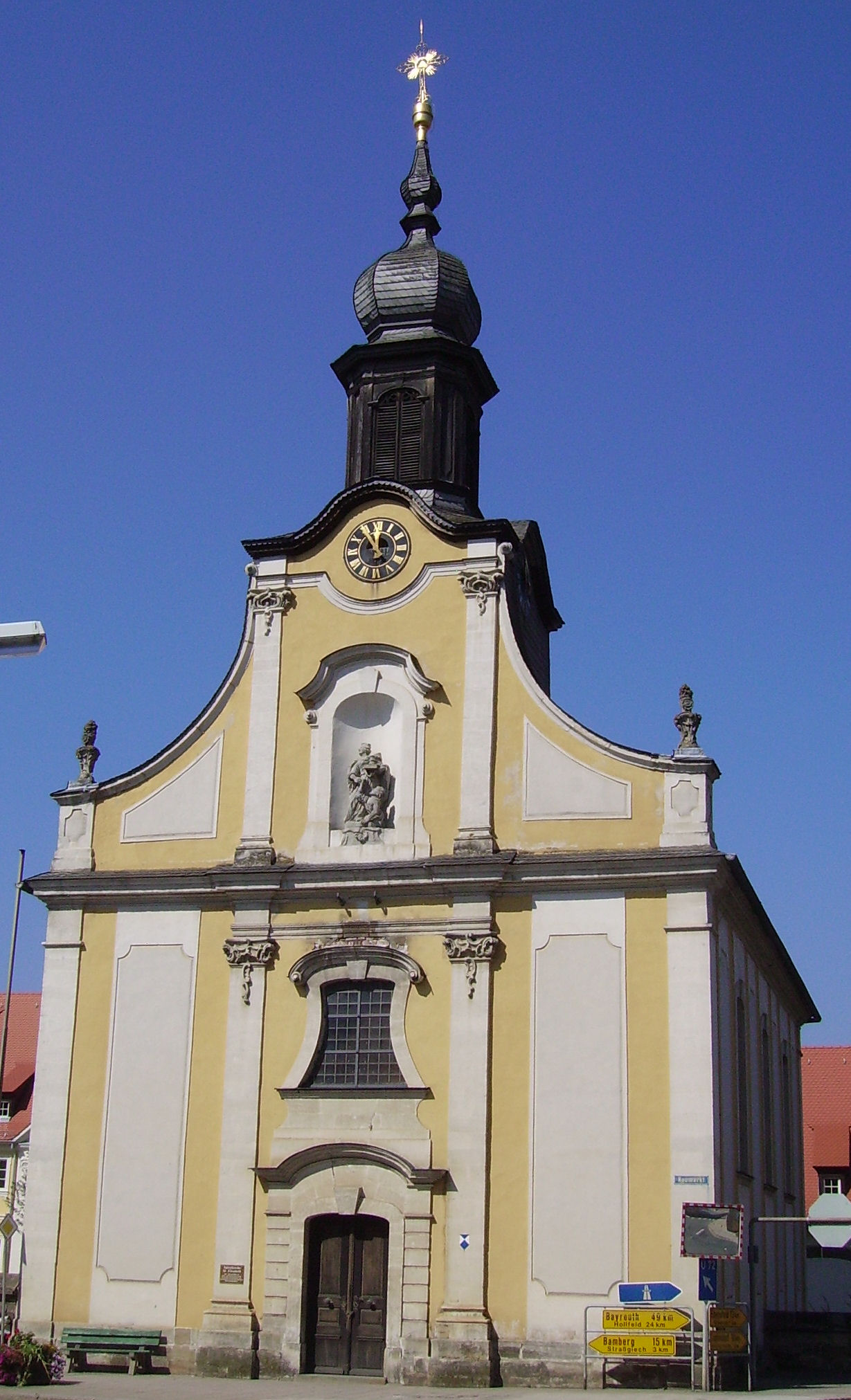
Elisabethen-Kirche

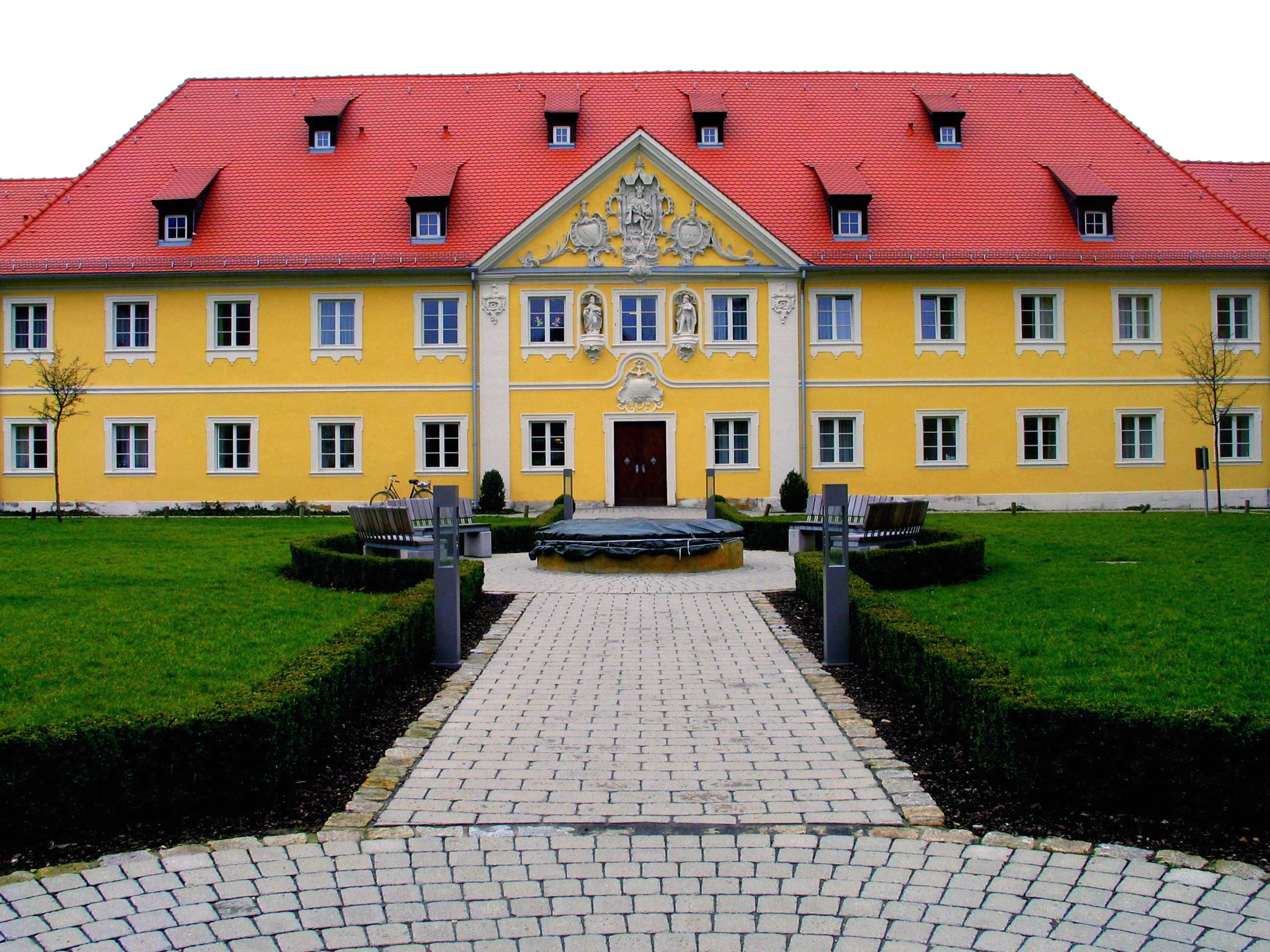
Former Elisabethenspital (hospital)

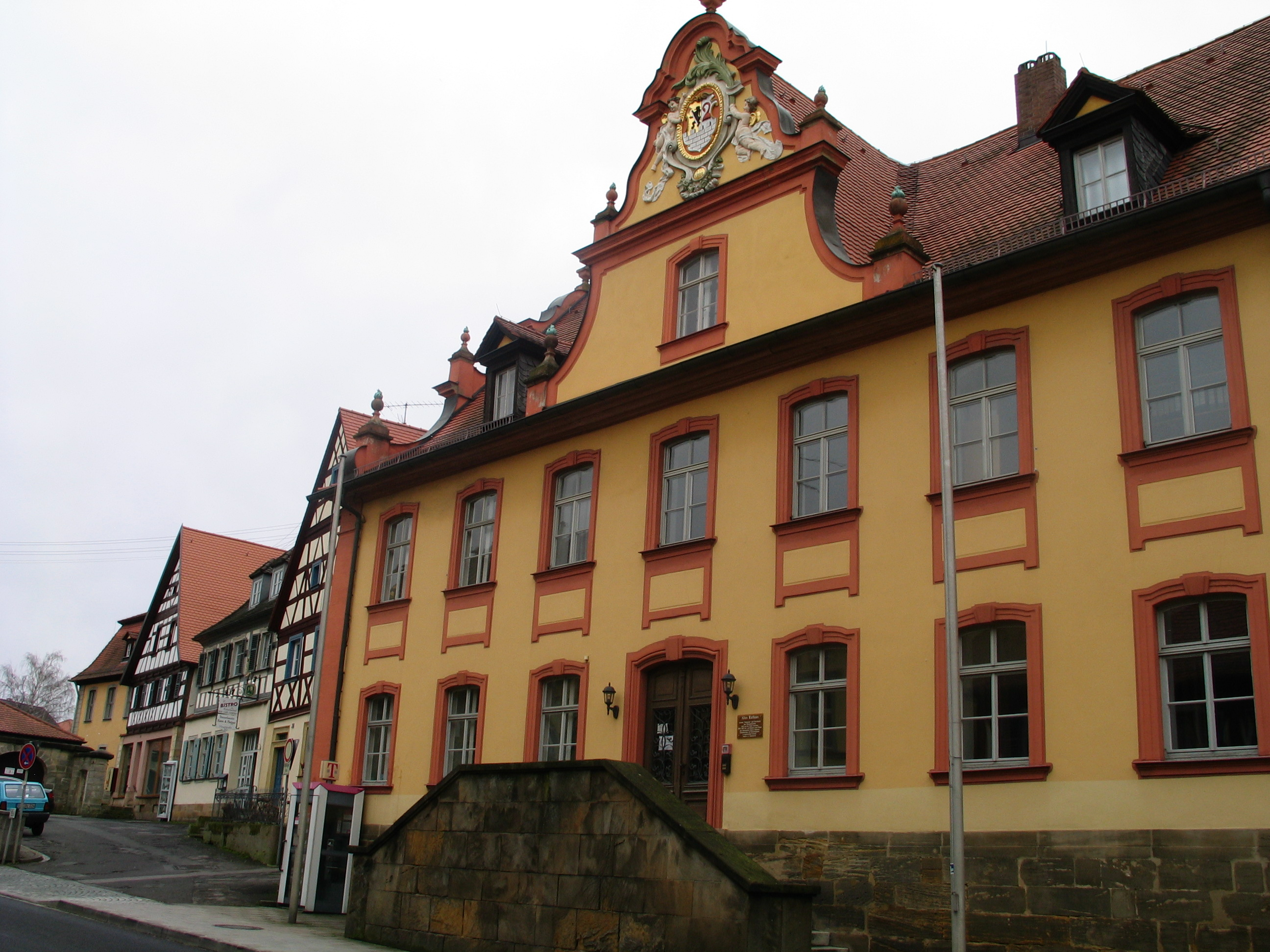
Old Town Hall

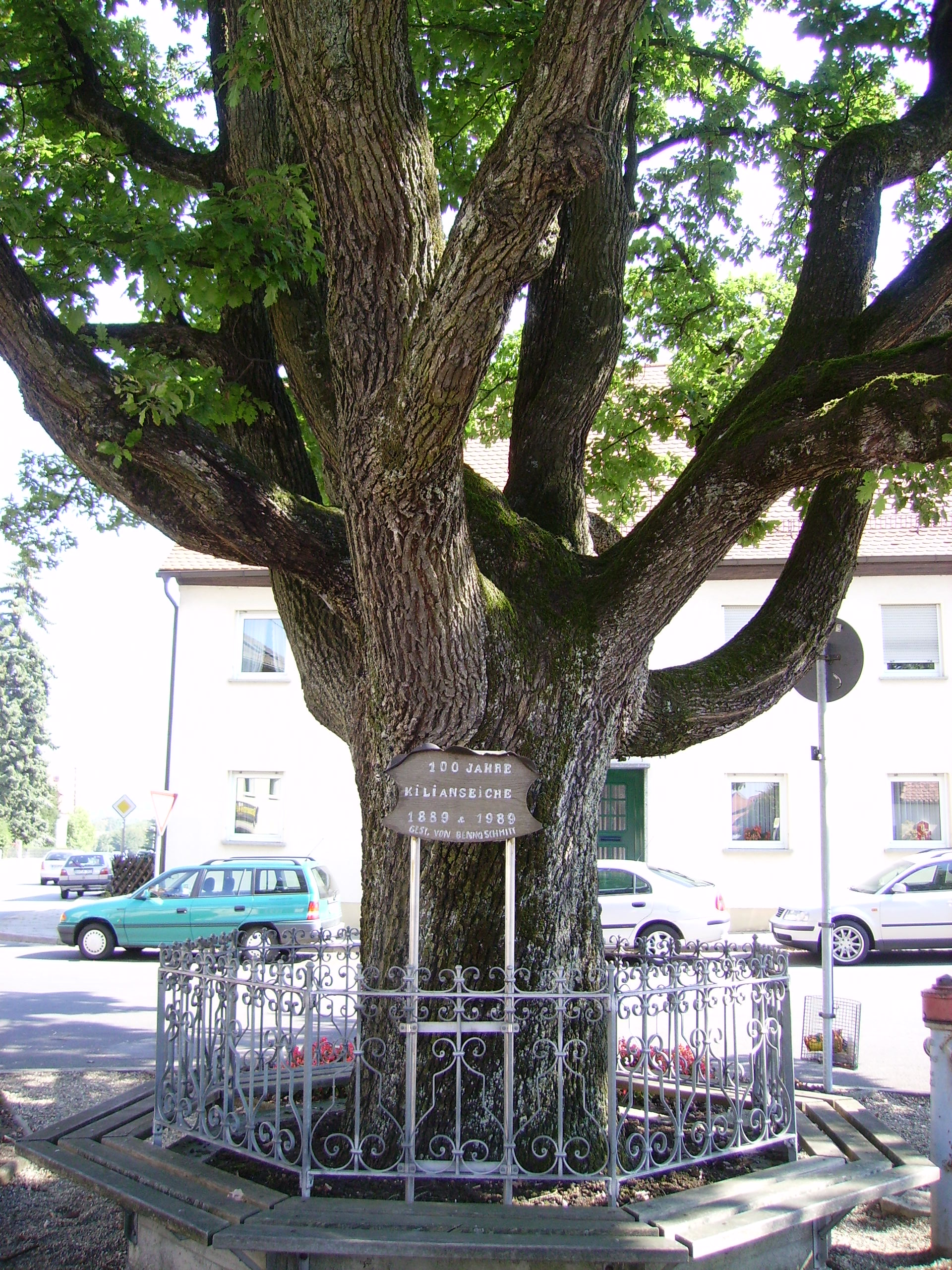
Kilians-Eiche (oak)

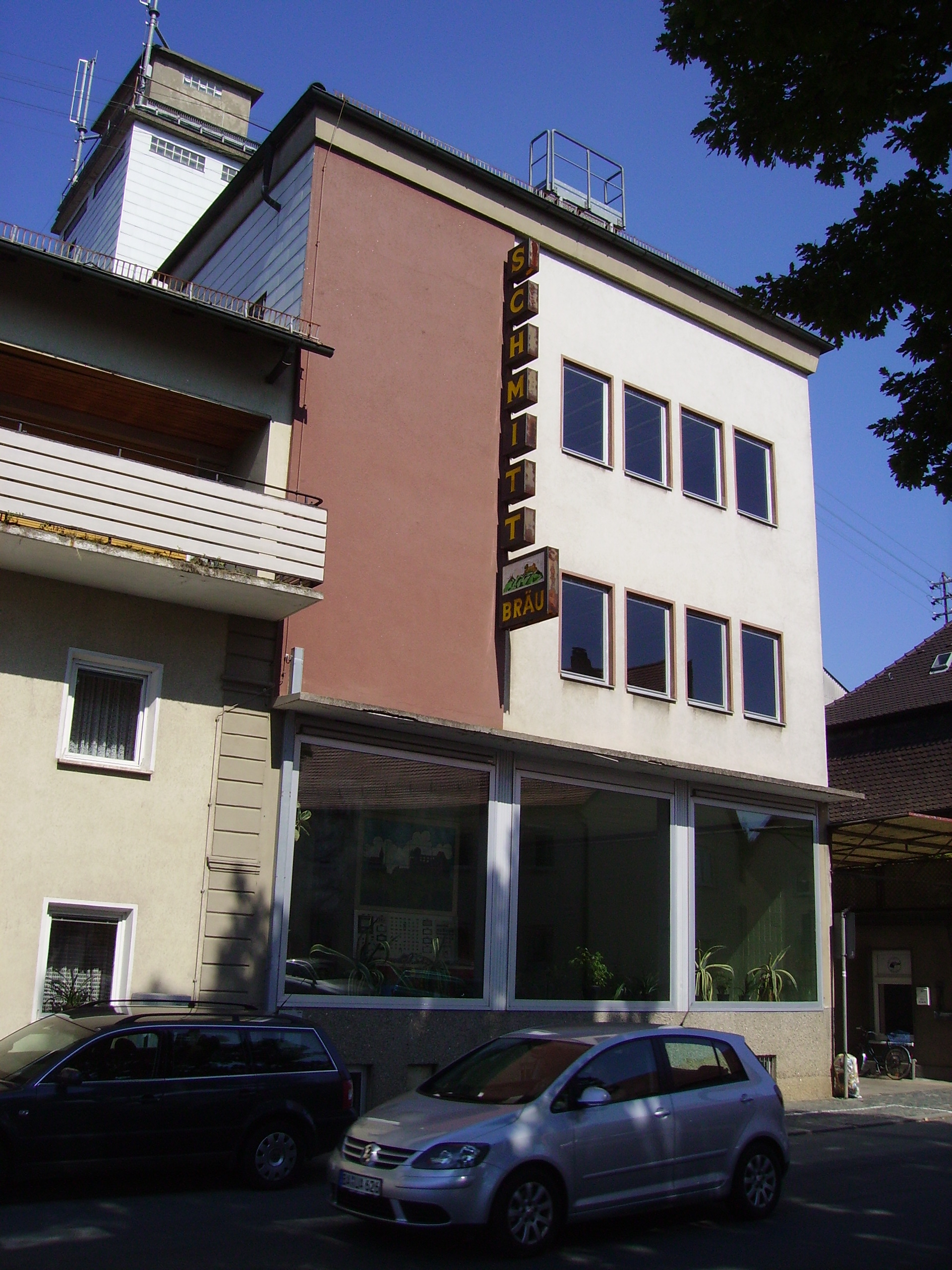
Brewery

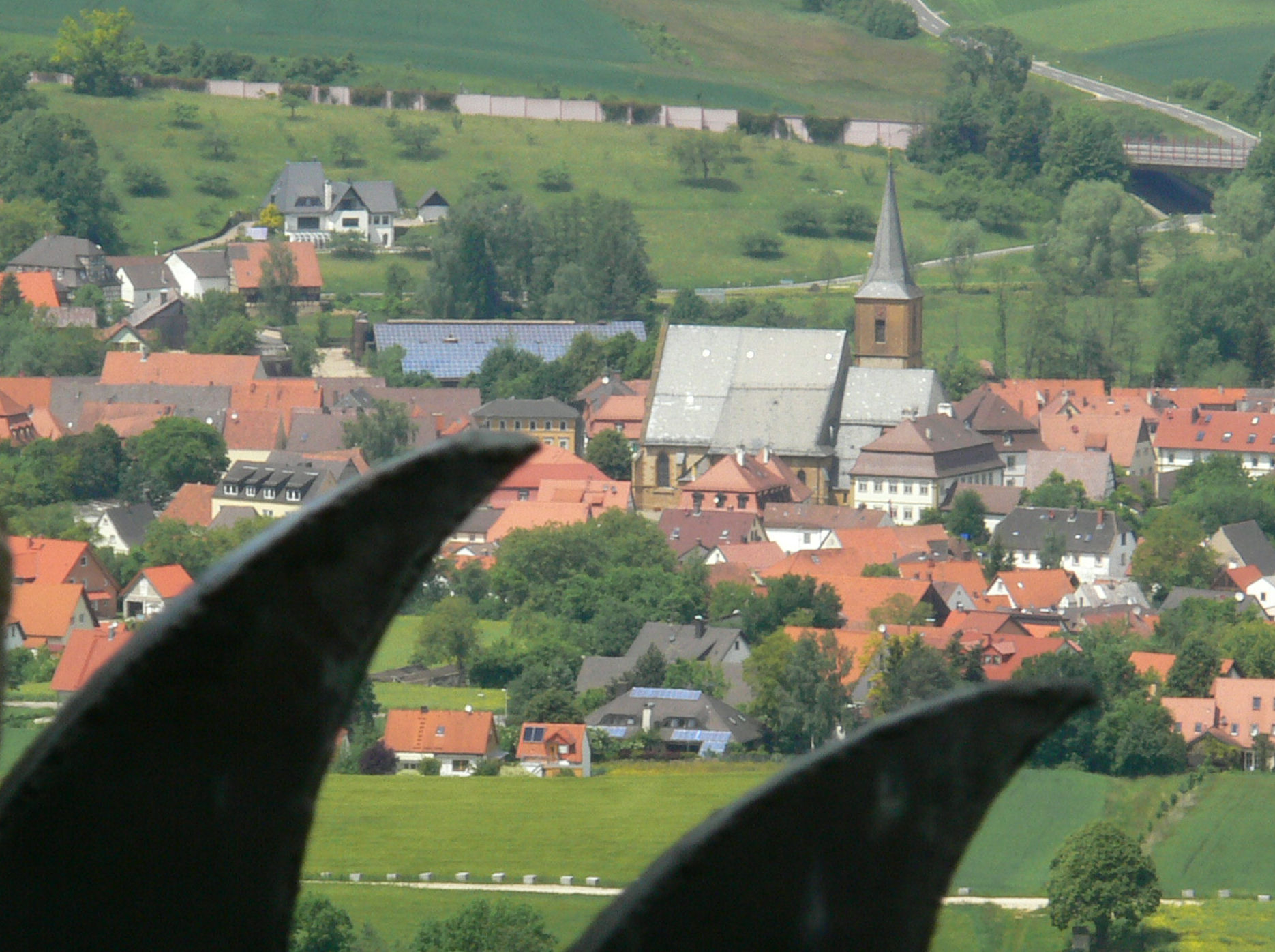
View from the Giechburg

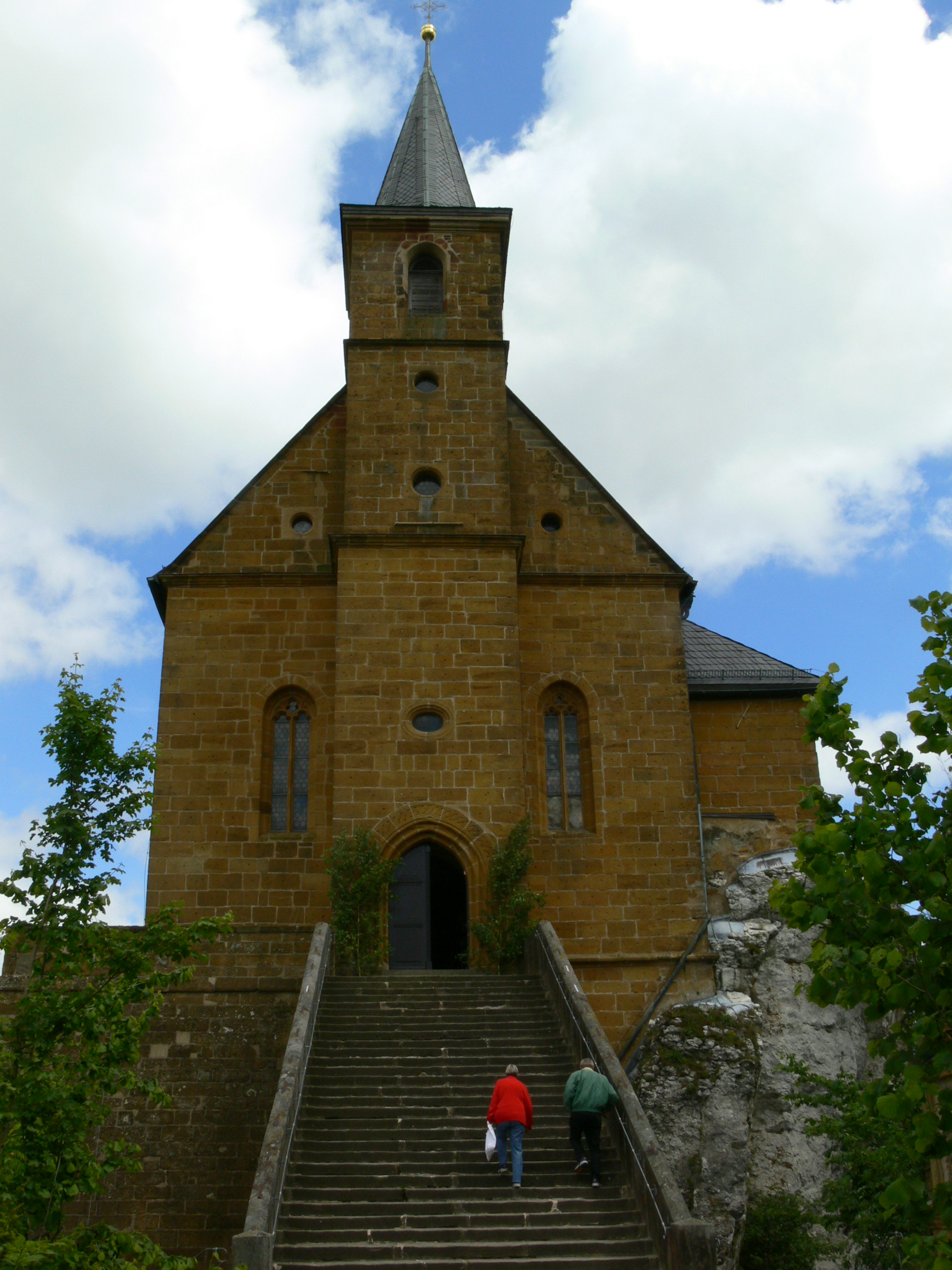
Gügel chapel

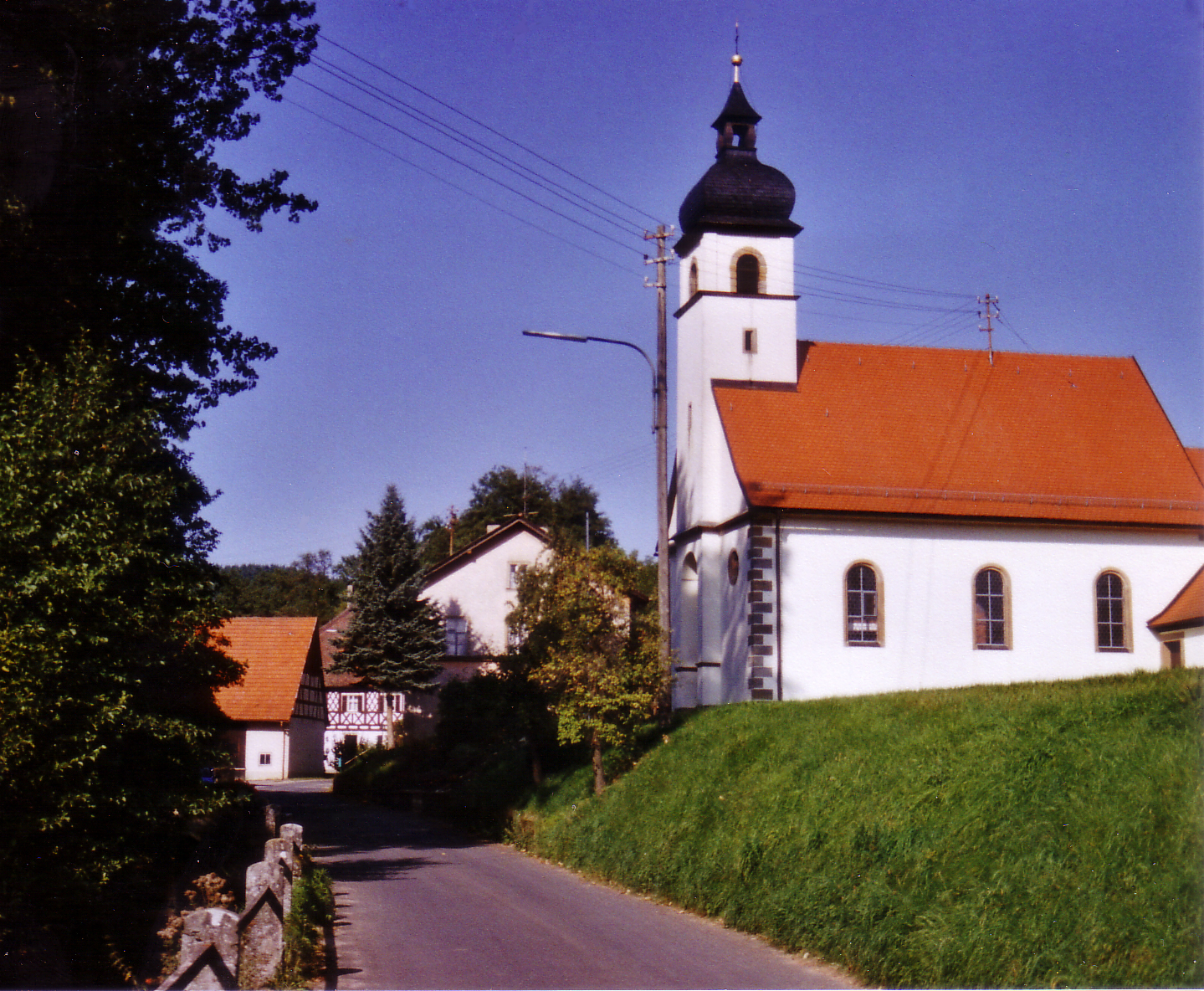
Chapel in Ehrl

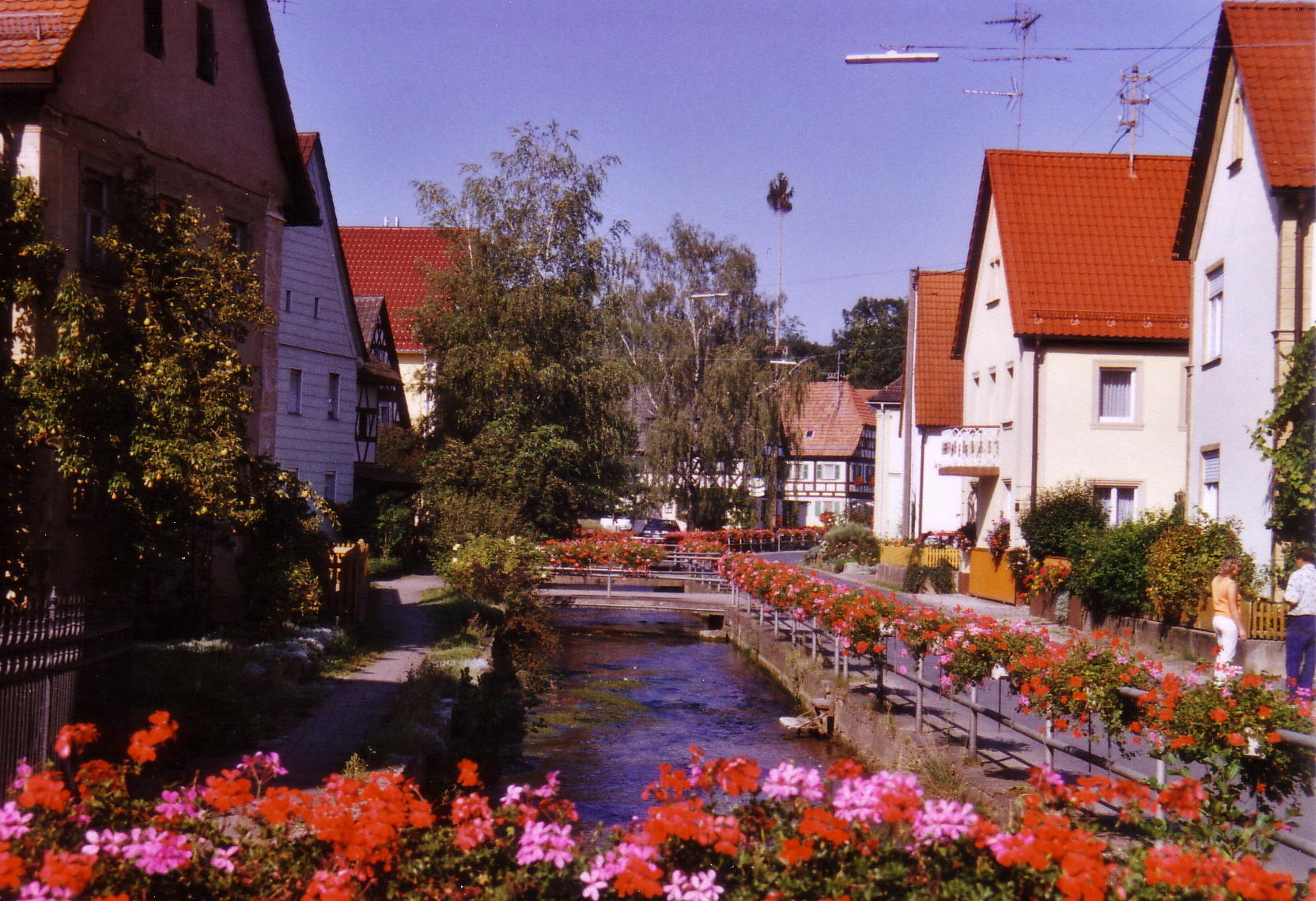
Ehrl

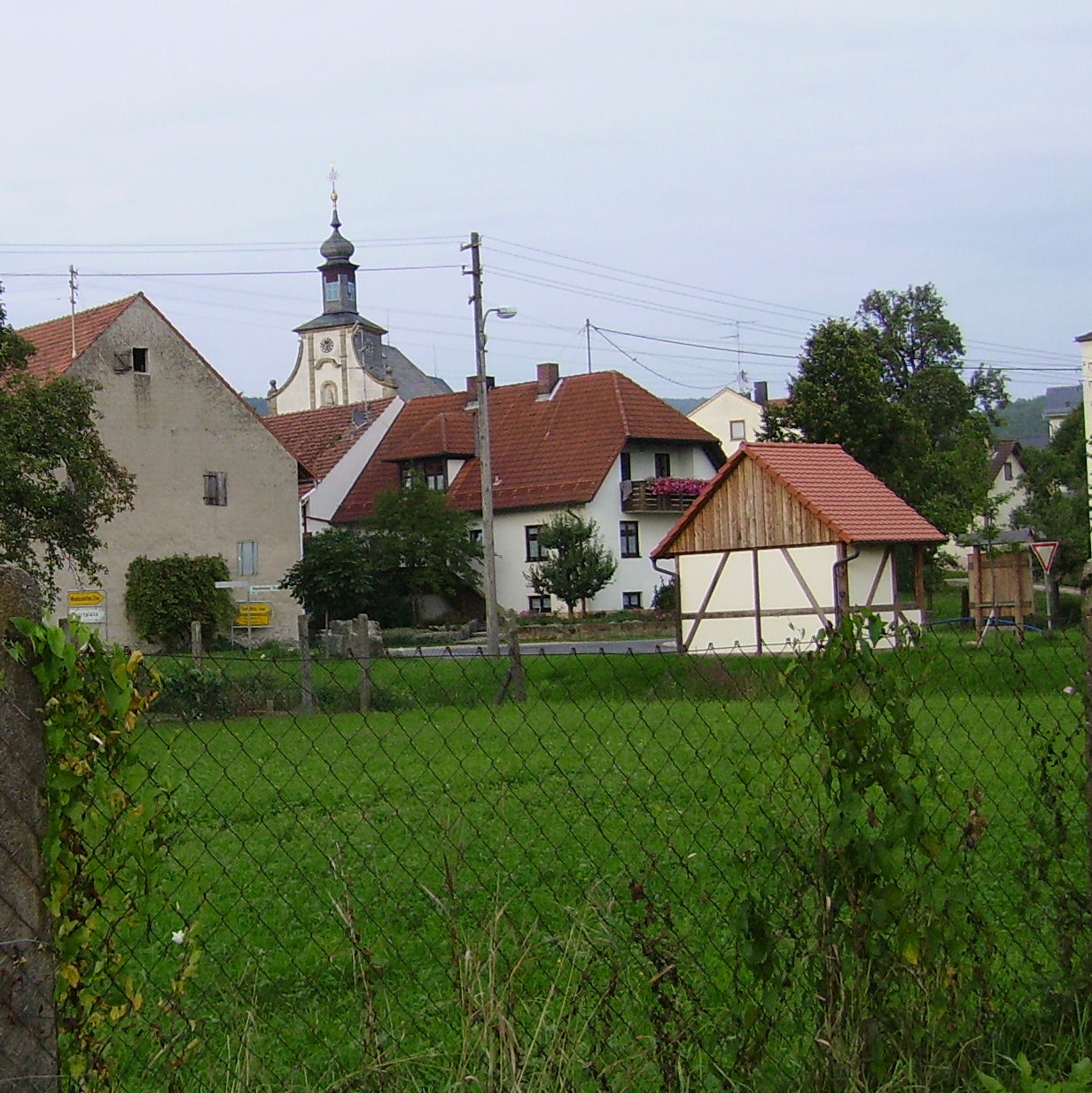
Schweisdorf

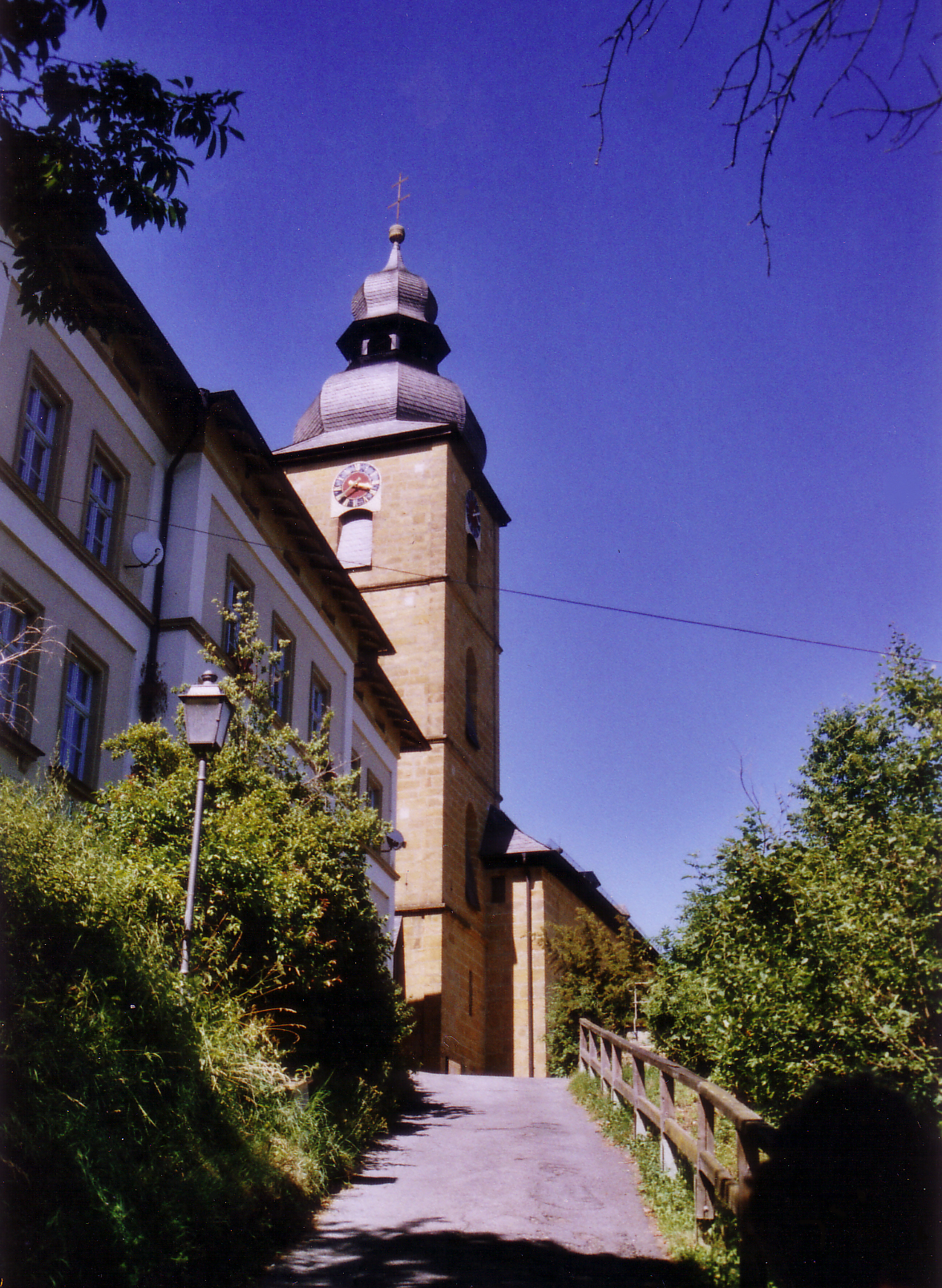
St.Martin Weichenwaserlos

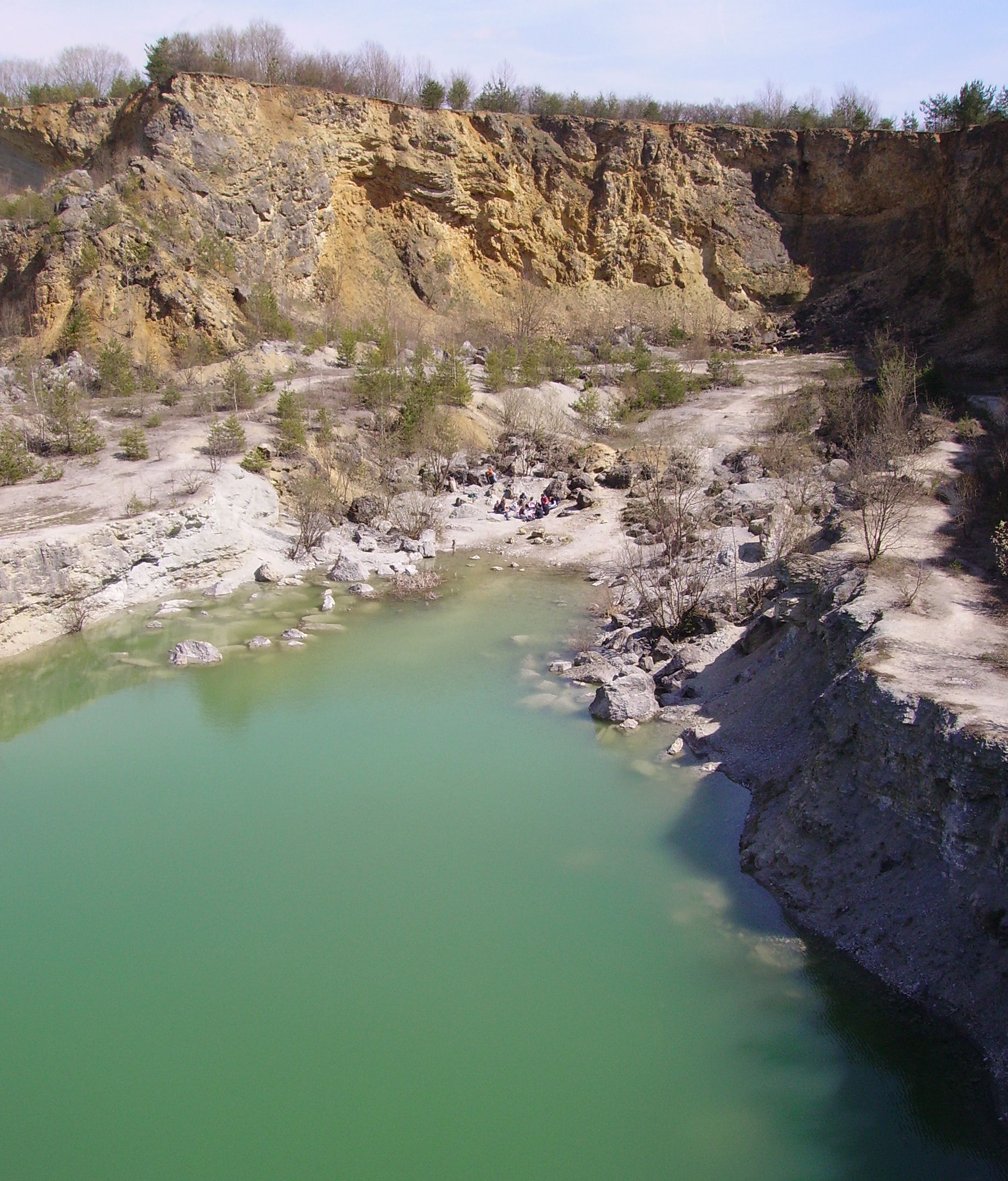
Quarry near Ludwag
