= Wattendorf =

- Municipality
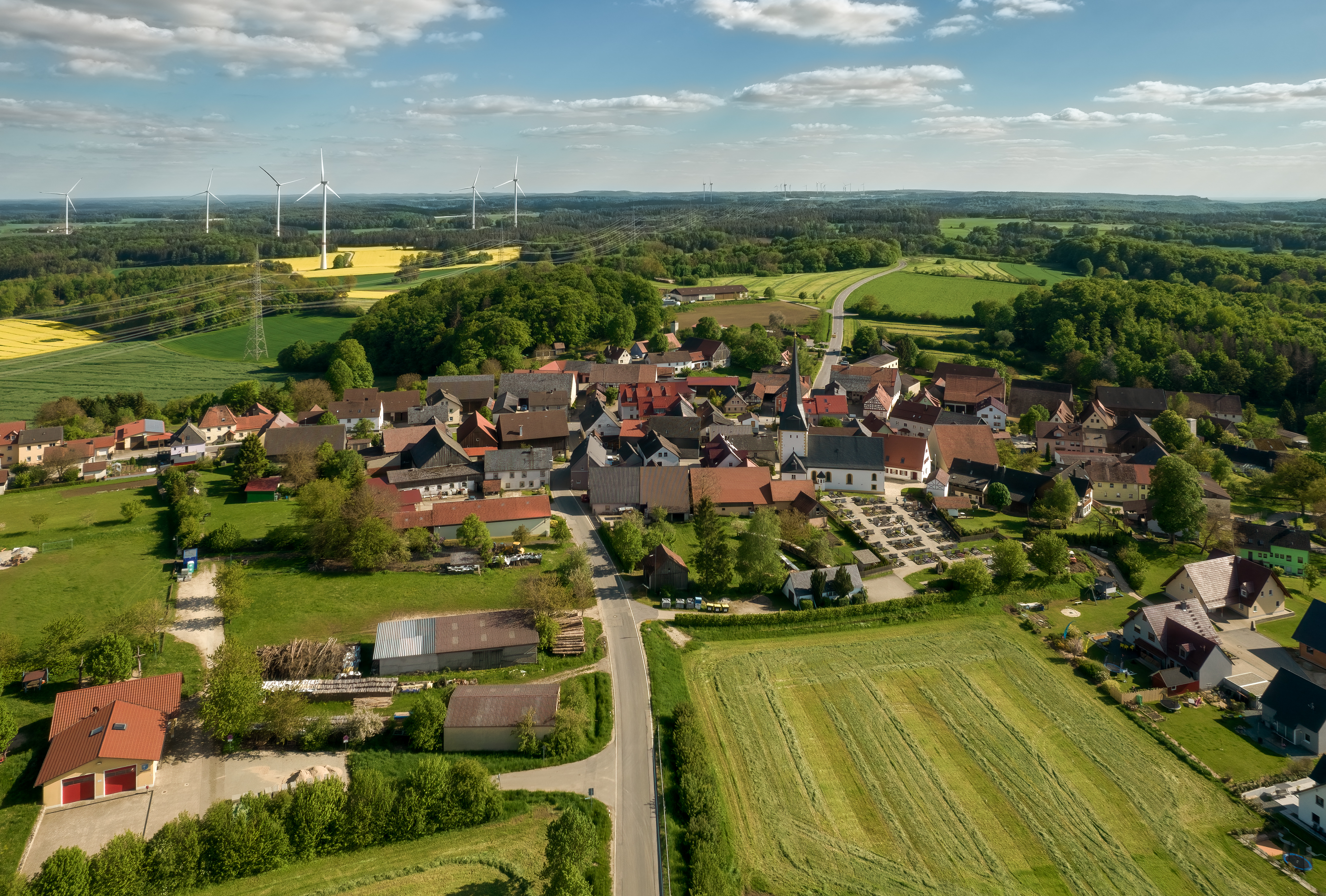
- Aerial view of Wattendorf

- Coat of arms

- Location of Wattendorf within Bamberg district
- Interactive map of Wattendorf
- Location within Germany Location within Bavaria
- Coordinates: 50°02′N 11°08′E
- Country: Germany
- State: Bavaria
- Admin. region: Oberfranken
- District: Bamberg
- Municipal assoc.: Steinfeld
- Subdivisions: 6 Ortsteile

Government
  - Mayor (2020–26): Thomas Betz (CSU)

Area
  - Total: 22.23 km^{2} (8.58 sq mi)
- Elevation: 530 m (1,740 ft)

Population (2025-12-31)
  - Total: 644
  - Density: 29.0/km^{2} (75.0/sq mi)
- Time zone: UTC+01:00 (CET)
  - Summer (DST): UTC+02:00 (CEST)
- Postal codes: 96196
- Dialling codes: 09504
- Vehicle registration: BA
- Website: www.wattendorf-oberfranken.de

Wattendorf is a municipality in the Upper Franconian district of Bamberg and a member of the administrative community (Verwaltungsgemeinschaft) of Steinfeld.

== Geography ==
The community lies on the edge of the “Franconian Switzerland” on the rise to the Franconian Jura in the east of the Bamberg district.

=== Constituent communities ===
The community has 5 traditional rural land units, known in German as Gemarkungen, each given here with its own population figure:

- Bojendorf (157)
- Gräfenhäusling (211)
- Mährenhüll (74)
- Schneeberg (60)
- Wattendorf (216)

== History ==
Wattendorf is very old as a settled place, having been settled in the time around 3000 to 1800 BC by the Linear Pottery culture.

It had its first documentary mention in 1180, when the community was owned by the Counts of the Duchy of Merania. From 1260 to 1274, Wattendorf was owned by the Count of Truhendingen. In 1274, he donated the estate to the Cistercian Monastery at Langheim, to which it belonged until Secularization in 1803. The Monastery's ties with the High Monastery at Bamberg grew weaker over time, so that by the time the Old Empire came to an end, the Langheim Monastery could almost be thought to be the High Monastery's Mediat. Since the Reichsdeputationshauptschluss of 1803, the community has belonged to Bavaria. In the course of administrative reform in Bavaria, today's community came into being under the Gemeindeedikt (“Community Edict”) of 1818.

=== Population development ===
Within municipal limits, 753 inhabitants were counted in 1970, 723 in 1987 and 722 in 2000. By 2007, the figure had further fallen to 708, but on 30 June 2007 it had risen slightly to 715.

== Politics ==
The first mayor was Thomas Betz from the CSU.

The community council is made up of x members, listed here by party or voter community affiliation, and also with the number of seats that each has held since the 2002 election and the percentage of the votes that each won:

- CSU 3 seats (30.2%)
- Bojendorfer Wählergemeinschaft 2 seats (22.9%)
- Wählergemeinschaft Gräfenhäusling 2 seats (25.6%)
- Freie Wähler Mährenhüll 1 seat (9.5%)
- Freie Wähler Schneeberg 0 seats (9.1%)

In 1999, municipal tax revenue, converted to euros, amounted to €274,000 of which business taxes (net) amounted to €50,000.

=== Coat of arms ===
Wattendorf's arms might heraldically be described thus: Azure a spread eagle argent reguardant, sinister a chalice Or, emerging therefrom an abbot's staff Or.

The eagle and the tincture azure (blue) recall the Counts of Andechs Merania, who until 1248 were Wattendorf's overlords. The chalice and the abbot's staff recall the community's donation to the Cistercian Monastery at Langheim by the Counts of Truhendingen in 1274.
