= Litzendorf =

- Municipality
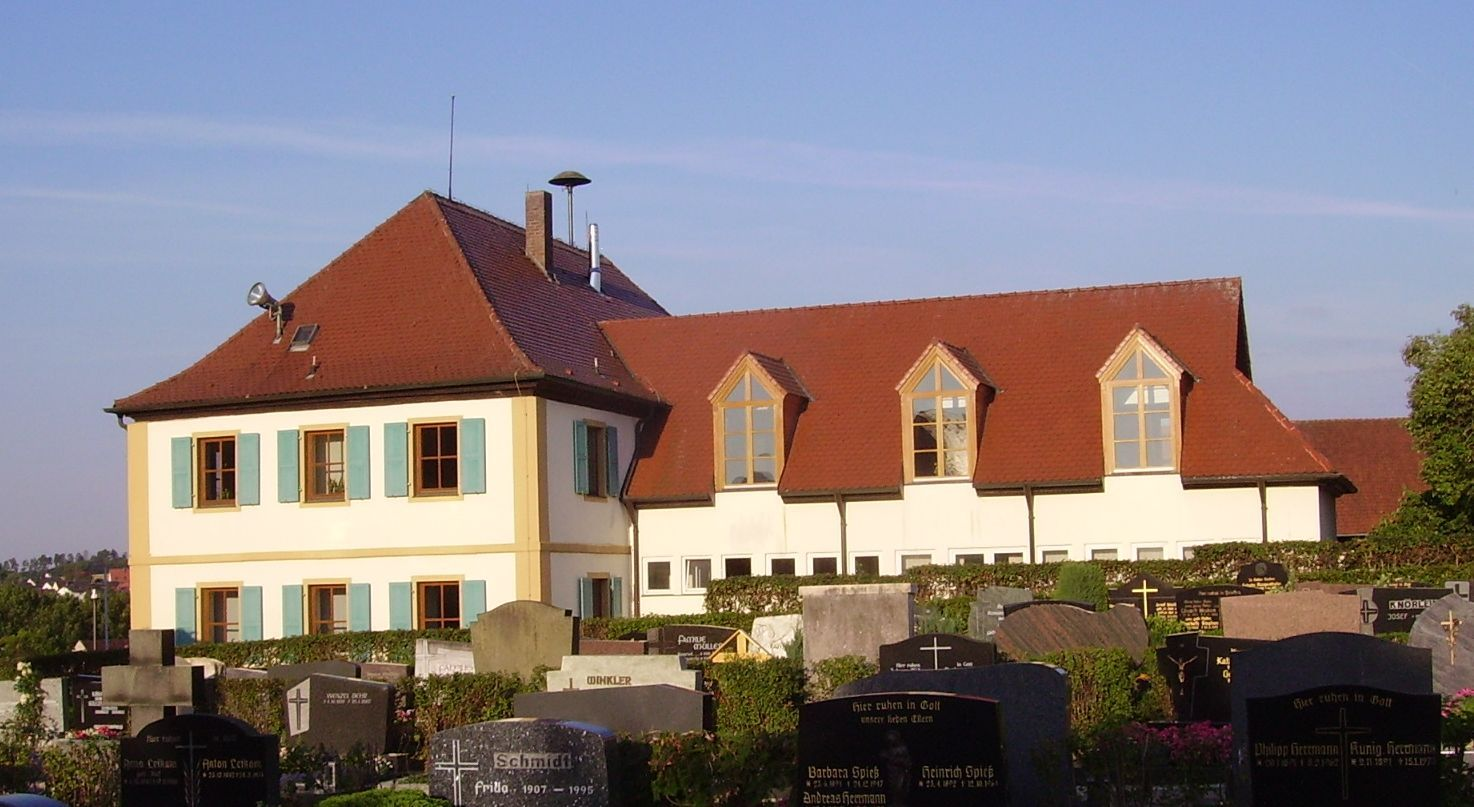
- Town hall

- Coat of arms

- Location of Litzendorf within Bamberg district
- Interactive map of Litzendorf
- Location within Germany Location within Bavaria
- Coordinates: 49°54′N 11°0′E
- Country: Germany
- State: Bavaria
- Admin. region: Oberfranken
- District: Bamberg
- Subdivisions: 8 Ortsteile

Government
  - Mayor (2020–26): Wolfgang Möhrlein (CSU)

Area
  - Total: 25.85 km^{2} (9.98 sq mi)
- Elevation: 311 m (1,020 ft)

Population (2025-12-31)
  - Total: 6,197
  - Density: 239.7/km^{2} (620.9/sq mi)
- Time zone: UTC+01:00 (CET)
  - Summer (DST): UTC+02:00 (CEST)
- Postal codes: 96123
- Dialling codes: 09505
- Vehicle registration: BA
- Website: www.litzendorf.de

Litzendorf is a municipality in the Upper Franconian district of Bamberg. Following an administrative reform it has been a unified community since 1 May 1978.

== Geography ==
Litzendorf and most of its outlying centres lie in the Ellern Valley, which is surrounded by wooded heights with the Bamberg district's two highest elevations, the Geisberg (585 m) and the Stammberg (560 m).

=== Constituent communities ===
Litzendorf's namesake centre is not the biggest of its Ortsteile. Pödeldorf is somewhat bigger. The community has these centres, each listed here with its own population figure:

Kunigundenruh	2 inhabitants
Litzendorf	1,492 inhabitants
Lohndorf	385 inhabitants
Melkendorf	757 inhabitants
Naisa	747 inhabitants
Pödeldorf	1,753 inhabitants
Schammelsdorf	784 inhabitants
Tiefenellern	210 inhabitants

=== Neighbouring communities ===
Memmelsdorf	Scheßlitz	Königsfeld	Heiligenstadt	Strullendorf	Hauptsmoorwald

== History ==
The derivation of the name Litzendorf is unclear. It could have come from the Slavic word lyko ("bast") or from the Germanic word litzel ("little").

In Merovingian and Carolingian times, when the villages, which were likely of Frankish and Slavic origin, arose, the Ellern Valley was still heavily wooded.

The name Litzendorf first cropped up in 1129 in a document from Bishop of Bamberg Otto, which mentions an Otgoz von Licindorf. Otgoz belonged to the lower subservient nobility and was a court and administrative official to Saint Otto.

Litzendorf later belonged to the High Monastery at Bamberg, but since the Reichsdeputationshauptschluss of 1803, the community has belonged to Bavaria.

=== Population development ===
Within municipal limits, 3,507 inhabitants were counted in 1970, 4,825 in 1987 and 5,907 in 2000. In 2005 it was 6,179, and in 2007 6,106.

== Politics ==
In 1999, municipal tax revenue, converted to euros, amounted to €2,279,000 of which business taxes (net) amounted to €206,000.

=== Municipal council ===
The community council is made up of 21 members, listed here by party or voter community affiliation, and also with the number of seats that each holds:

	CSU	SPD	GRÜNE	Christliche Wählervereinigung	Total
2002	9	5	3	3	20

(as of election on 3 March 2002)

=== Coat of arms ===
Litzendorf's arms might heraldically be described thus: Party per pale Or and azure, Or a lion rampant sable armed and langued gules, thereover a bendlet argent, azure a helm argent with nasal dexter.

The Bamberg lion stands for the High Monastery's former overlordship in Litzendorf. The helmet stands for the ministeriales of Litzendorf, who were active in the 12th century, at a time when they bore no arms.

== Sightseeing ==
=== Fränkische Straße der Skulpturen ===
The "Franconian Road of Sculptures" between the villages of Tiefenellern, Lohndorf and Litzendorf came into being in 1994 and is a sculpture exhibit in the middle of the Ellern Valley countryside.

=== Singers’ memorial near Melkendorf ===
The Sängerehrenmal for the dead and fallen of the Franconian Sängerbund ("Singers’ League") was built in 1963 on a plot of higher ground above Melkendorf. The memorial consists of twelve limestone columns set in a circle and an altarlike sarcophagus. In the memorial stone are memorial books with the names of the dead from the originally 12, now 13, singing circles. The wrought iron altar wing bears the Latin inscription Mortui vivimus – "We, the dead, live".

=== Jungfernhöhle near Tiefenellern ===
The Jungfernhöhle ("Maids’ Cave") near Tiefenellern is a Neolithic archaeological site. Digs here brought to light use of the cave by four cultures in the New Stone Age and by almost all subsequent ones. The name Jungfernhöhle refers to the human remains found here, which were overwhelmingly female.

=== Barrows near Litzendorf ===
On the road from Litzendorf to Geisfeld are found early Celtic barrows. The group of mounds is completely surrounded by forest. The barrows’ diameters range from 8 to 25 metres. During digs in the 19th century, material from the Bronze Age and the early Iron Age was unearthed.

=== Parish church of St. Wenceslas ===
The Baroque Pfarrkirche St. Wenzeslaus in Litzendorf was built between 1715 and 1718 by master builder Johann Dientzenhofer. It is built from shiny, gold-coloured iron-bearing sandstone blocks and can be seen far from the community.

The choice of the Bohemian duke and national Saint Wenceslas as the church's patron likely goes back to Prince-Bishop Lambrecht von Brun, who was a close adviser to Emperor Karl IV, who lived in Prague, and also chancellor to his son Wenceslas (Wenzel). After Litzendorf was raised to parish in 1406, there arose a new building whose four-storey choir tower still stands today.

When damage to the building began to show in the late 17th century, there was hesitation about repairing it. Only in 1702, after Johann Christoph Reinhard had been made the parish priest and set himself to the business at hand was something done about it. He wanted something special, and therefore he had the Bamberg court master builder Johann Dientzenhofer add a suitable nave onto the choir tower.

== Gallery ==
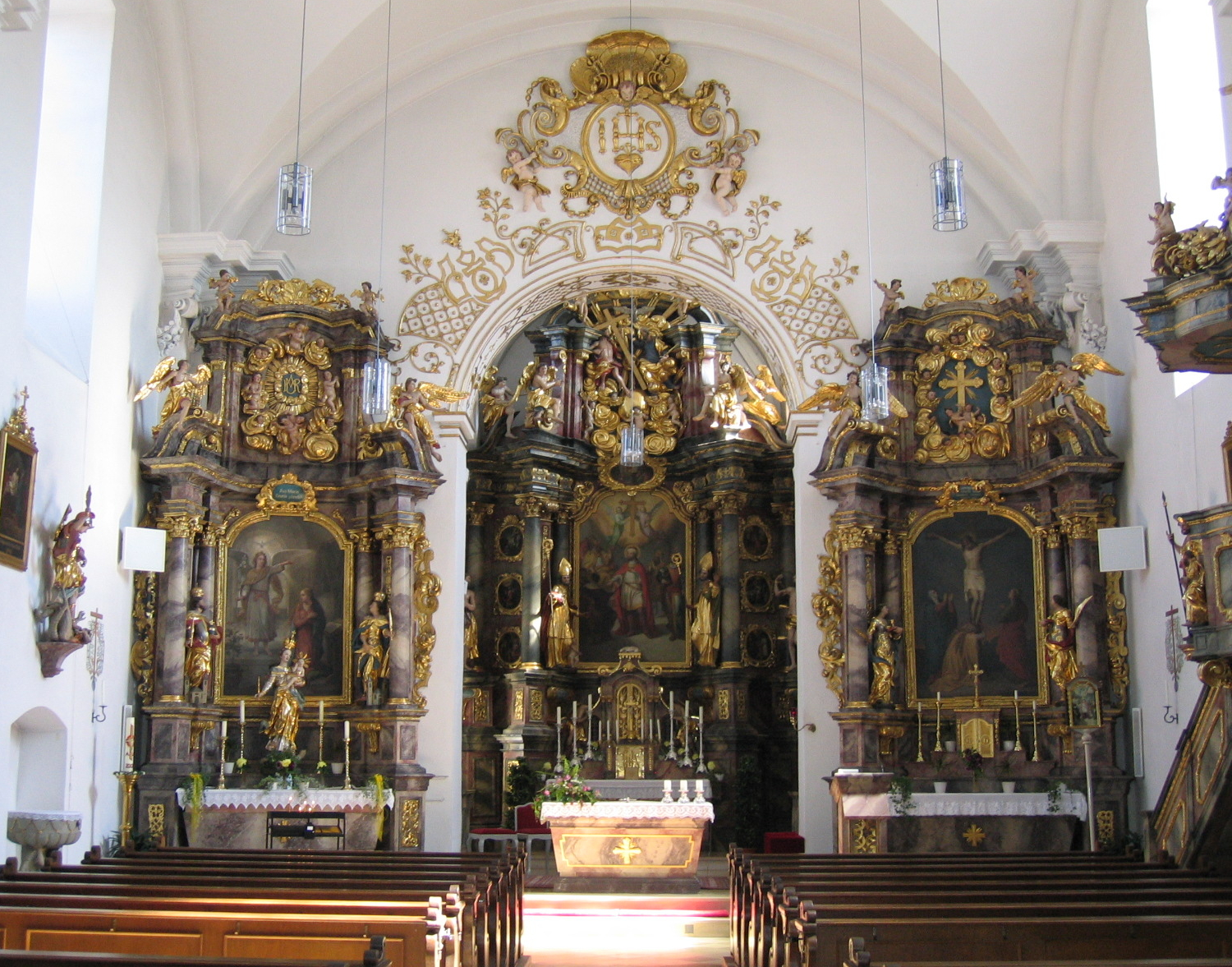
Interior of St. Wenceslaus's parish church, built 1715-1718

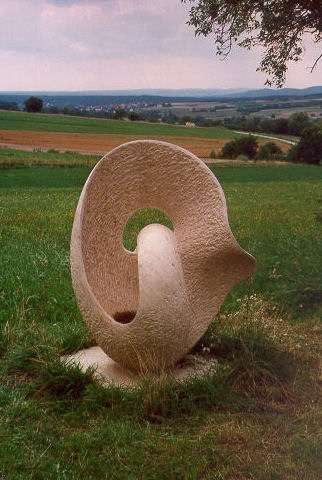
Franconian Road of Sculptures

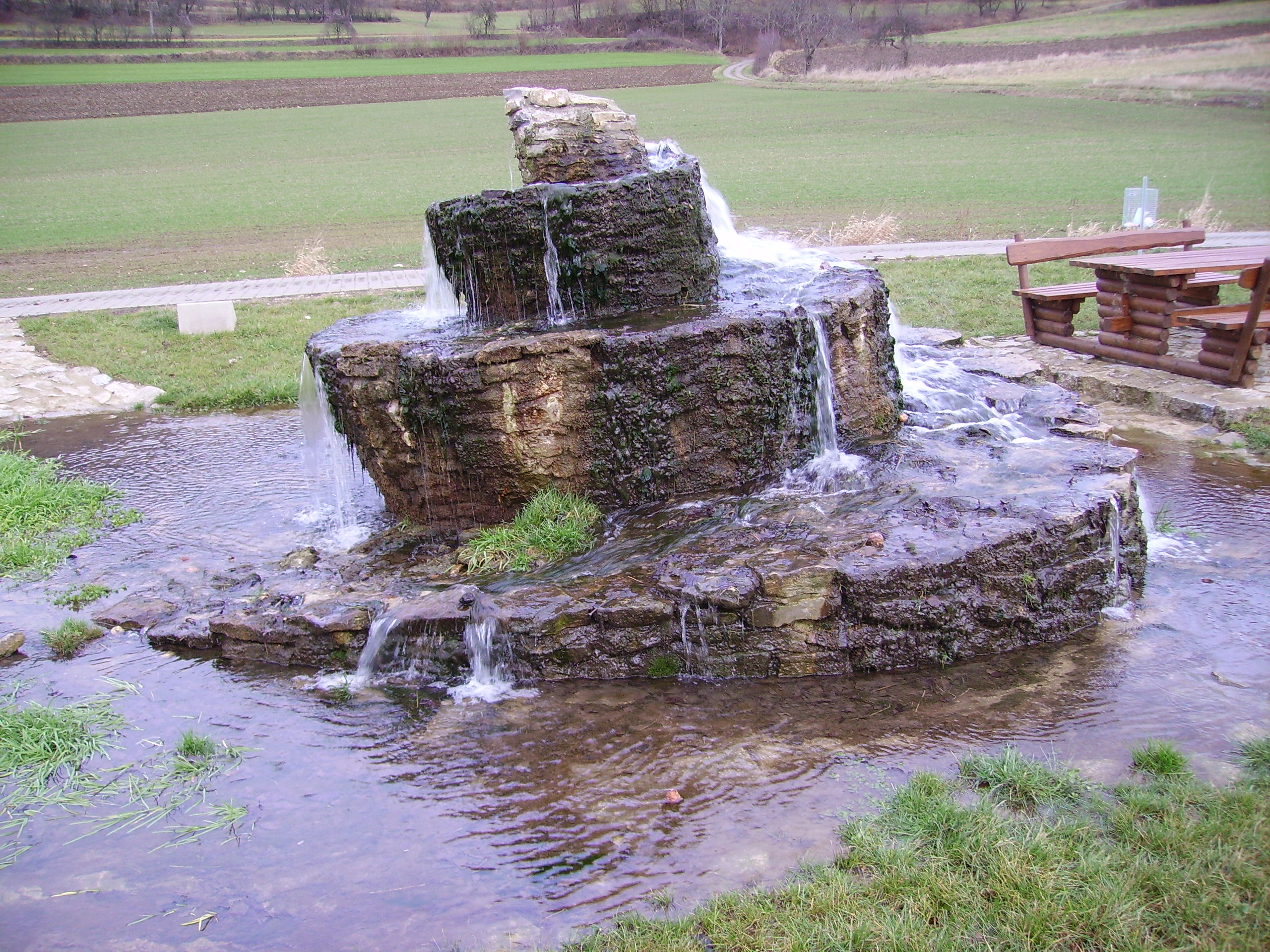
Franconian Road of Sculptures

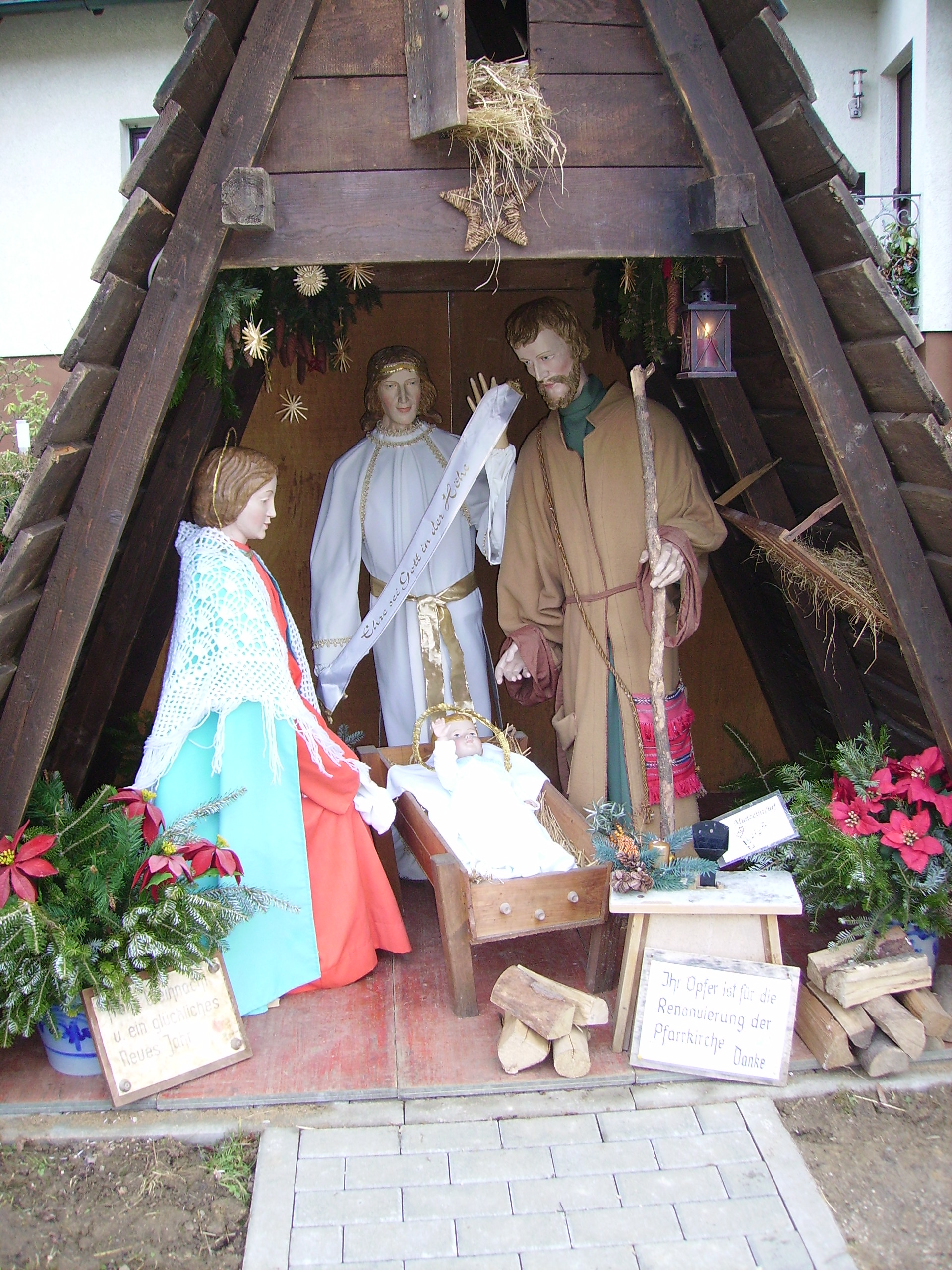
Nativity Scene in Lohndorf

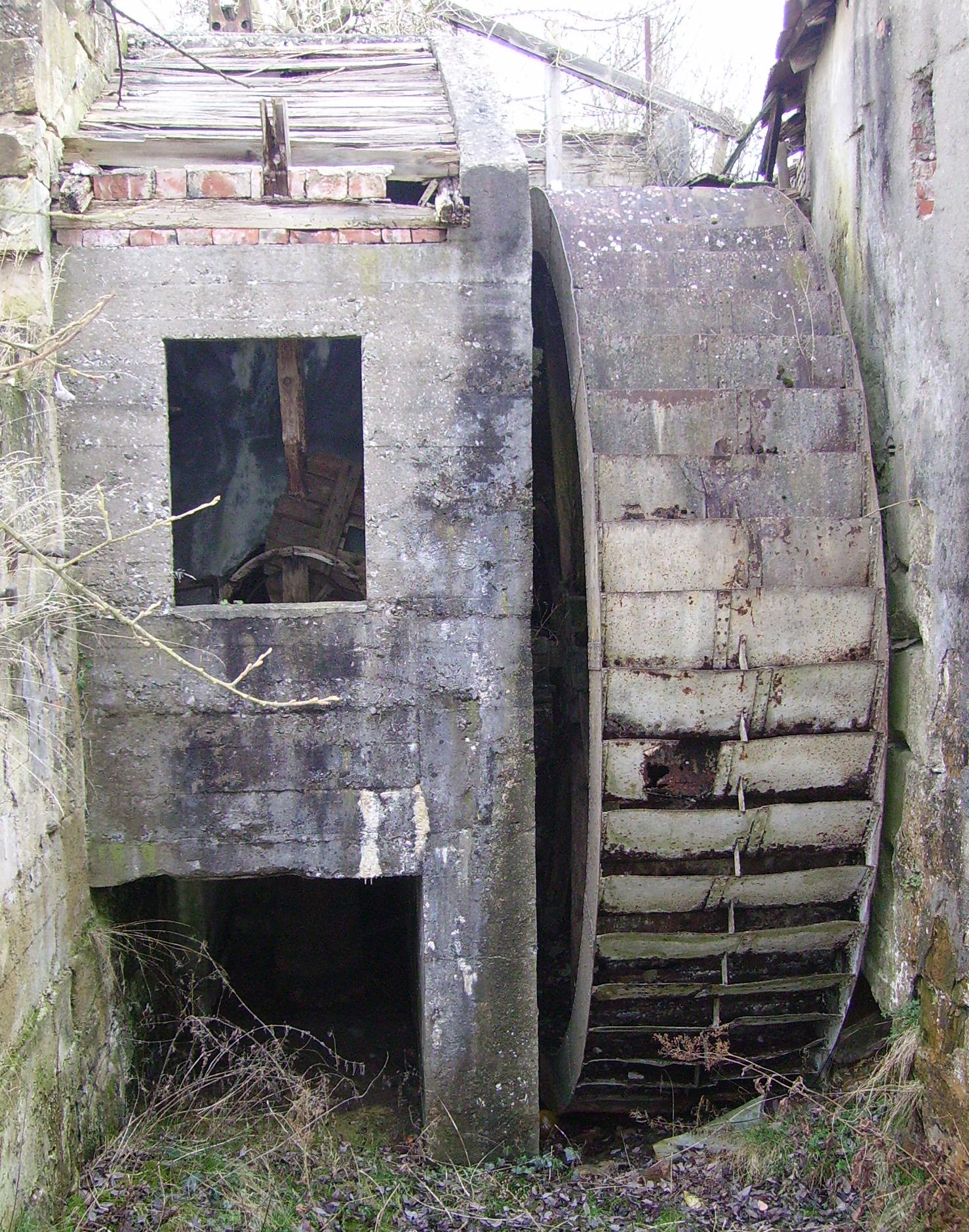
Waterwheel at old mill in Pödeldorf

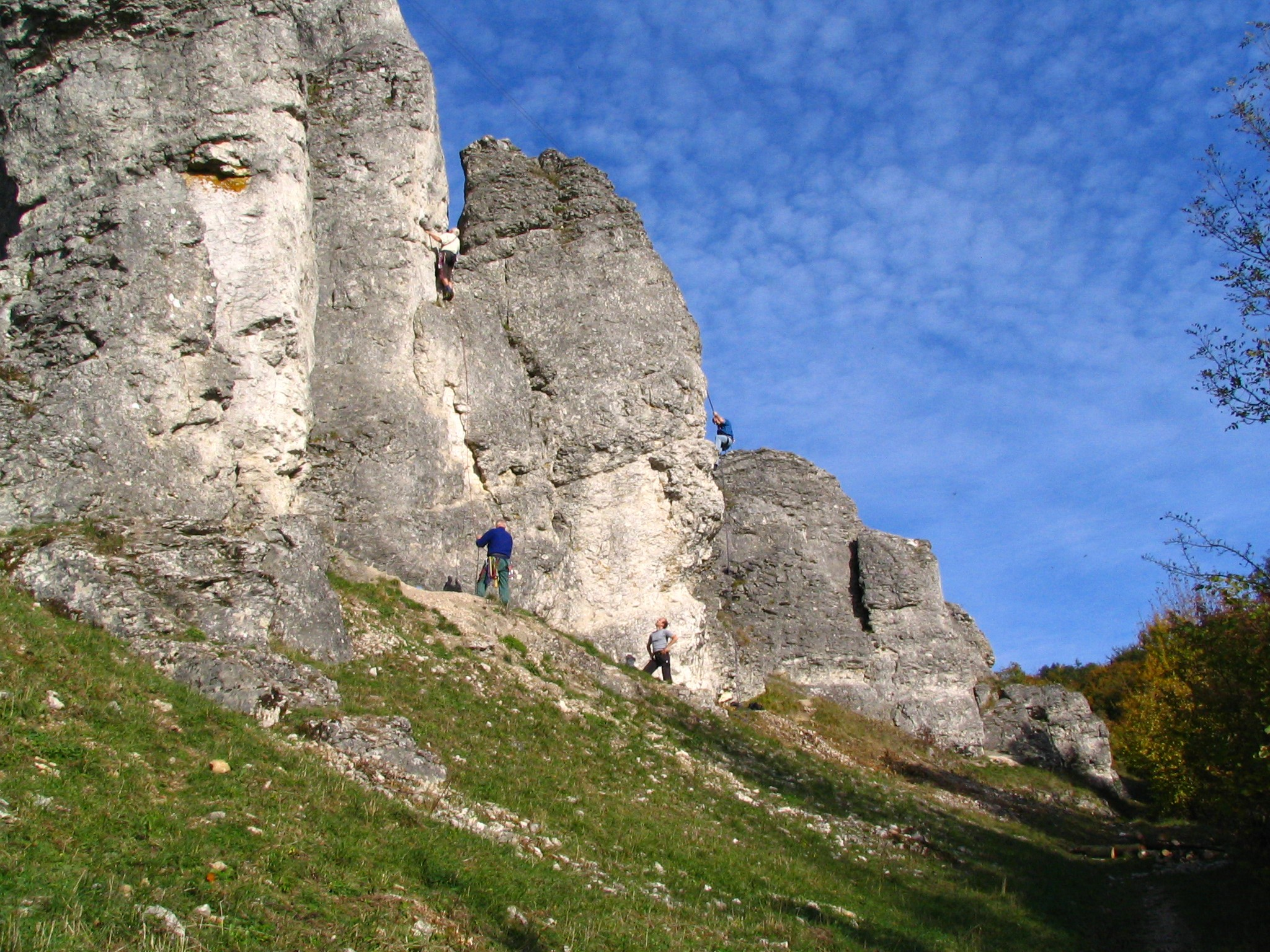
Eulenfelsen, or Owl's Crags, at the Ellerer Berg

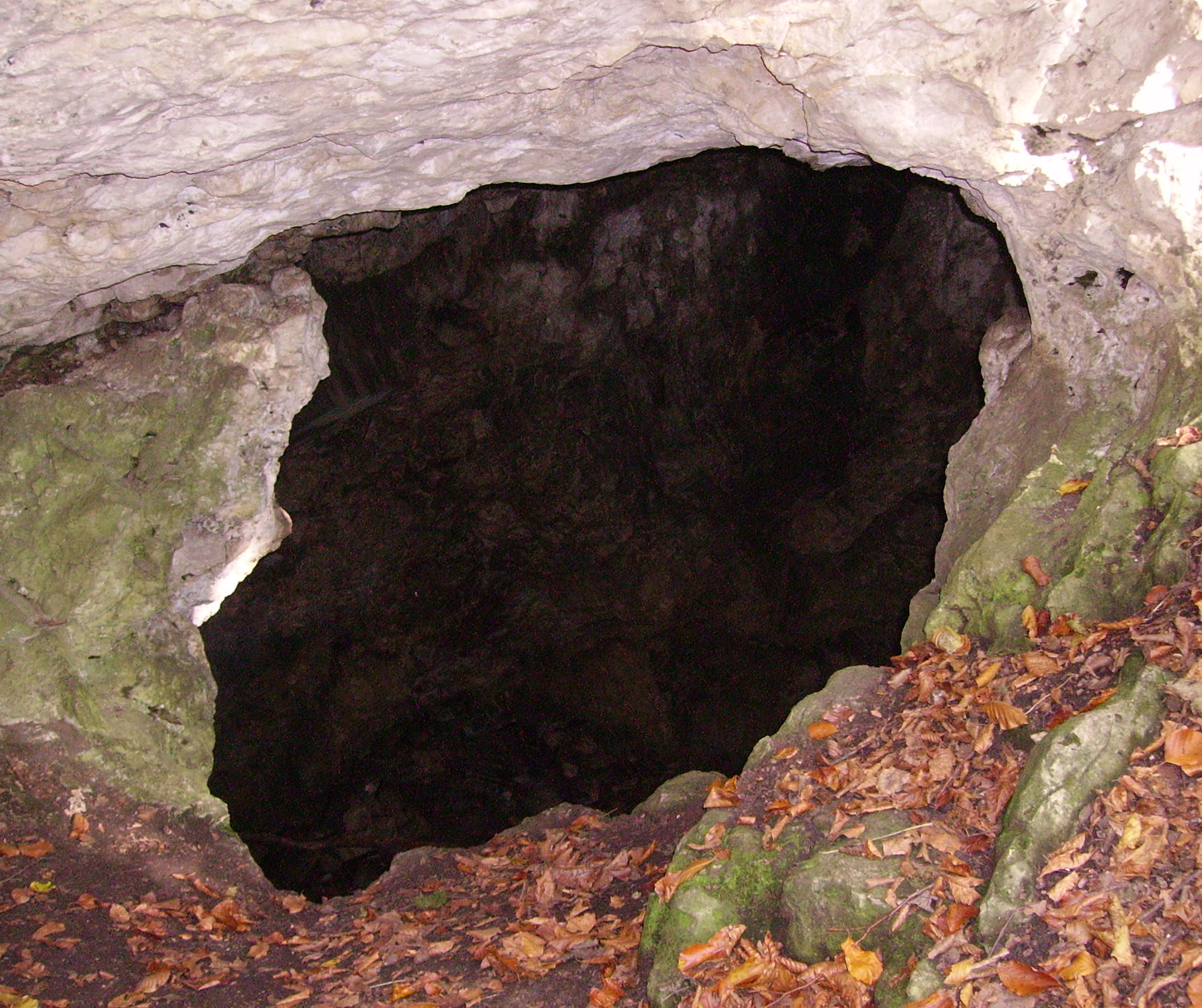
Entrance to Jungfernhöhle
