= Kulmbach (electoral district) =

Federal electoral district of Germany

239 Kulmbach
- Electoral district for the Bundestag
- Kulmbach in 2025
- State: Bavaria
- Population: 209,800 (2019)
- Electorate: 165,446 (2025)
- Major settlements: Kulmbach; Lichtenfels; Bad Staffelstein
- Area: 1,733.0 km^{2}

Current electoral district
- Created: 1949
- Party: CSU
- Member: Emmi Zeulner
- Elected: 2013, 2017, 2021, 2025

Kulmbach is an electoral constituency (German: Wahlkreis) represented in the Bundestag. It elects one member via first-past-the-post voting. Under the current constituency numbering system, it is designated as constituency 239. It is located in northern Bavaria, comprising the Kulmbach district, the Lichtenfels district, and the northern part of the Bamberg district.

Kulmbach was created for the inaugural 1949 federal election. Since 2013, it has been represented by Emmi Zeulner of the Christian Social Union (CSU).

== Geography ==
Kulmbach is located in northern Bavaria. As of the 2021 federal election, it comprises the districts of Kulmbach and Lichtenfels as well as the municipalities of Bischberg, Breitengüßbach, Gundelsheim, Heiligenstadt in Oberfranken, Kemmern, Litzendorf, Memmelsdorf, Oberhaid, Rattelsdorf, Scheßlitz, Viereth-Trunstadt, and Zapfendorf and the Verwaltungsgemeinschaften of Baunach and Steinfeld from the Bamberg district.

== History ==
Kulmbach was created in 1949. In the 1949 election, it was Bavaria constituency 29 in the numbering system. In the 1953 through 1961 elections, it was number 224. In the 1965 through 1998 elections, it was number 226. In the 2002 and 2005 elections, it was number 241. In the 2009 through 2021 elections, it was number 240. From the 2025 election, it has been number 239.

Originally, the constituency comprised the independent city of Kulmbach and the districts of Landkreis Kulmbach, Lichtenfels, Naila, and Stadtsteinach. In the 1965 through 1972 elections, it comprised the independent cities of Kulmbach and Forchheim and the districts of Landkreis Kulmbach, Landkreis Forchheim, Lichtenfels, Stadtsteinach, and Ebermannstadt. In the 1976 through 1998 elections, it comprised the districts of Kulmbach and Lichtenfels as well as the municipalities of Baunach, Scheßlitz, Gerach, Heiligenstadt, Königsfeld, Lauter, Rattelsdorf, Reckendorf, Stadelhofen, Wattendorf, and Zapfendorf from the Bamberg district. It acquired its current borders in the 2002 election.

Election	No.	Name	Borders
1949	29	Kulmbach	Kulmbach city; Landkreis Kulmbach district; Lichtenfels district; Naila district; Stadtsteinach district
1953	224	Kulmbach	Kulmbach city; Landkreis Kulmbach district; Lichtenfels district; Naila district; Stadtsteinach district
1957	224	Kulmbach	Kulmbach city; Landkreis Kulmbach district; Lichtenfels district; Naila district; Stadtsteinach district
1961	224	Kulmbach	Kulmbach city; Landkreis Kulmbach district; Lichtenfels district; Naila district; Stadtsteinach district
1965	226	Kulmbach	Kulmbach city; Forchheim city; Landkreis Kulmbach district; Landkreis Forchheim district; Lichtenfels district; Stadtsteinach district; Ebermannstadt district
1969	226	Kulmbach	Kulmbach city; Forchheim city; Landkreis Kulmbach district; Landkreis Forchheim district; Lichtenfels district; Stadtsteinach district; Ebermannstadt district
1972	226	Kulmbach	Kulmbach city; Forchheim city; Landkreis Kulmbach district; Landkreis Forchheim district; Lichtenfels district; Stadtsteinach district; Ebermannstadt district
1976	226	Kulmbach	Kulmbach district; Lichtenfels district; Bamberg district (only Baunach, Scheßlitz, Gerach, Heiligenstadt in Oberfranken, Königsfeld, Lauter, Rattelsdorf, Reckendorf, Stadelhofen, Wattendorf, and Zapfendorf municipalities)
1980	226	Kulmbach	Kulmbach district; Lichtenfels district; Bamberg district (only Baunach, Scheßlitz, Gerach, Heiligenstadt in Oberfranken, Königsfeld, Lauter, Rattelsdorf, Reckendorf, Stadelhofen, Wattendorf, and Zapfendorf municipalities)
1983	226	Kulmbach	Kulmbach district; Lichtenfels district; Bamberg district (only Baunach, Scheßlitz, Gerach, Heiligenstadt in Oberfranken, Königsfeld, Lauter, Rattelsdorf, Reckendorf, Stadelhofen, Wattendorf, and Zapfendorf municipalities)
1987	226	Kulmbach	Kulmbach district; Lichtenfels district; Bamberg district (only Baunach, Scheßlitz, Gerach, Heiligenstadt in Oberfranken, Königsfeld, Lauter, Rattelsdorf, Reckendorf, Stadelhofen, Wattendorf, and Zapfendorf municipalities)
1990	226	Kulmbach	Kulmbach district; Lichtenfels district; Bamberg district (only Baunach, Scheßlitz, Gerach, Heiligenstadt in Oberfranken, Königsfeld, Lauter, Rattelsdorf, Reckendorf, Stadelhofen, Wattendorf, and Zapfendorf municipalities)
1994	226	Kulmbach	Kulmbach district; Lichtenfels district; Bamberg district (only Baunach, Scheßlitz, Gerach, Heiligenstadt in Oberfranken, Königsfeld, Lauter, Rattelsdorf, Reckendorf, Stadelhofen, Wattendorf, and Zapfendorf municipalities)
1998	226	Kulmbach	Kulmbach district; Lichtenfels district; Bamberg district (only Baunach, Scheßlitz, Gerach, Heiligenstadt in Oberfranken, Königsfeld, Lauter, Rattelsdorf, Reckendorf, Stadelhofen, Wattendorf, and Zapfendorf municipalities)
2002	241	Kulmbach	Kulmbach district; Lichtenfels district; Bamberg district (only Bischberg, Breitengüßbach, Gundelsheim, Heiligenstadt in Oberfranken, Kemmern, Litzendorf, Memmelsdorf, Oberhaid, Rattelsdorf, Scheßlitz, Viereth-Trunstadt, and Zapfendorf municipalities and Baunach and Steinfeld Verwaltungsgemeinschaften
2005	241	Kulmbach	Kulmbach district; Lichtenfels district; Bamberg district (only Bischberg, Breitengüßbach, Gundelsheim, Heiligenstadt in Oberfranken, Kemmern, Litzendorf, Memmelsdorf, Oberhaid, Rattelsdorf, Scheßlitz, Viereth-Trunstadt, and Zapfendorf municipalities and Baunach and Steinfeld Verwaltungsgemeinschaften
2009	240	Kulmbach	Kulmbach district; Lichtenfels district; Bamberg district (only Bischberg, Breitengüßbach, Gundelsheim, Heiligenstadt in Oberfranken, Kemmern, Litzendorf, Memmelsdorf, Oberhaid, Rattelsdorf, Scheßlitz, Viereth-Trunstadt, and Zapfendorf municipalities and Baunach and Steinfeld Verwaltungsgemeinschaften
2013	240	Kulmbach	Kulmbach district; Lichtenfels district; Bamberg district (only Bischberg, Breitengüßbach, Gundelsheim, Heiligenstadt in Oberfranken, Kemmern, Litzendorf, Memmelsdorf, Oberhaid, Rattelsdorf, Scheßlitz, Viereth-Trunstadt, and Zapfendorf municipalities and Baunach and Steinfeld Verwaltungsgemeinschaften
2017	240	Kulmbach	Kulmbach district; Lichtenfels district; Bamberg district (only Bischberg, Breitengüßbach, Gundelsheim, Heiligenstadt in Oberfranken, Kemmern, Litzendorf, Memmelsdorf, Oberhaid, Rattelsdorf, Scheßlitz, Viereth-Trunstadt, and Zapfendorf municipalities and Baunach and Steinfeld Verwaltungsgemeinschaften
2021	240	Kulmbach	Kulmbach district; Lichtenfels district; Bamberg district (only Bischberg, Breitengüßbach, Gundelsheim, Heiligenstadt in Oberfranken, Kemmern, Litzendorf, Memmelsdorf, Oberhaid, Rattelsdorf, Scheßlitz, Viereth-Trunstadt, and Zapfendorf municipalities and Baunach and Steinfeld Verwaltungsgemeinschaften
2025	239	Kulmbach	Kulmbach district; Lichtenfels district; Bamberg district (only Bischberg, Breitengüßbach, Gundelsheim, Heiligenstadt in Oberfranken, Kemmern, Litzendorf, Memmelsdorf, Oberhaid, Rattelsdorf, Scheßlitz, Viereth-Trunstadt, and Zapfendorf municipalities and Baunach and Steinfeld Verwaltungsgemeinschaften

== Members ==
The constituency has been held by the Christian Social Union (CSU) during all but one Bundestag term since its creation. It was first represented by Friedrich Schönauer of the Social Democratic Party (SPD) from 1949 until his death in 1950. Johannes Semler of the CSU won the resulting by-election. He was succeeded by Max Spörl in the 1953 federal election, followed by Gustav Sühler in 1957, and Karl Theodor zu Guttenberg in 1961. Lorenz Niegel was then representative from 1969 to 1990. Bernd Protzner served from 1990 to 2002, followed by Karl-Theodor zu Guttenberg from 2002 to 2013. Emmi Zeulner was elected in 2013, and re-elected in 2017, 2021, and 2025.

Election	Member	Party	%
1949	Friedrich Schönauer	SPD	27.6
1950	Johannes Semler	CSU	38.7
1953	Max Spörl	CSU	51.7
1957	Gustav Sühler	CSU	53.0
1961	Gustav Sühler	CSU	48.8
1965	Karl Theodor Freiherr von und zu Guttenberg	CSU	59.0
1969	Lorenz Niegel	CSU	55.0
1972	Lorenz Niegel	CSU	56.3
1976	Lorenz Niegel	CSU	60.8
1980	Lorenz Niegel	CSU	60.4
1983	Lorenz Niegel	CSU	65.2
1987	Lorenz Niegel	CSU	59.2
1990	Bernd Protzner	CSU	56.5
1994	Bernd Protzner	CSU	53.3
1998	Bernd Protzner	CSU	49.7
2002	Karl-Theodor zu Guttenberg	CSU	63.0
2005	Karl-Theodor zu Guttenberg	CSU	60.0
2009	Karl-Theodor zu Guttenberg	CSU	68.1
2013	Emmi Zeulner	CSU	56.9
2017	Emmi Zeulner	CSU	55.4
2021	Emmi Zeulner	CSU	47.8
2025	Emmi Zeulner	CSU	49.3

== Election results ==
=== 2025 election ===
Federal election (2025): Kulmbach
Notes:	Blue background denotes the winner of the electorate vote. Pink background denotes a candidate elected from their party list. Yellow background denotes an electorate win by a list member, or other incumbent. A ✓ or ✗ denotes status of any incumbent, win or lose respectively.						
Party	Candidate	Votes	%	±%	Party votes	%	±%
CSU	✓ Emmi Zeulner	69,446	49.3	▲1.6	56,803	40.3	▲4.1
AfD	Sebastian Johannes Görtler	30,698	21.8	▲11.2	32,988	23.4	▲11.8
SPD	Ali-Cemil Sat	13,210	9.4	▼6.8	15,327	10.9	▼8.9
Greens	Thomas Josef Ochs	9,232	6.6	▼0.9	10,176	7.2	▼1.6
FW	Jochen Sebastian Bergmann	8,744	6.2	▼1.4	7,184	5.1	▼2.5
Left	Oswald Emil Greim	5,361	3.8	▲2.0	6,210	4.4	▲2.2
FDP	Kevin Blechschmidt	2,838	2.0	▼2.7	4,550	3.2	▼5.1
BSW					4,183	3.0	
APT					1,133	0.8	▼0.3
Volt	Benjamin Günter Eichelkraut	1,237	0.9		719	0.5	▲0.4
PARTEI					538	0.4	▼0.5
dieBasis					439	0.3	▼0.9
ÖDP					424	0.3	▼0.1
BP					172	0.1	▼0.2
BD					129	0.1	
Humanists					75	0.1	Steady
MLPD					25	0.0	Steady
Informal votes		771			462		
Total valid votes		140,766			141,075		
Turnout		141,537	85.5	▲4.3			
CSU hold	Majority	38,748	27.5	▼4.1			

=== 2021 election ===
Federal election (2021): Kulmbach
Notes:	Blue background denotes the winner of the electorate vote. Pink background denotes a candidate elected from their party list. Yellow background denotes an electorate win by a list member, or other incumbent. A ✓ or ✗ denotes status of any incumbent, win or lose respectively.						
Party	Candidate	Votes	%	±%	Party votes	%	±%
CSU	✓ Emmi Zeulner	65,163	47.8	▼7.7	49,389	36.2	▼7.2
SPD	Simon Moritz	22,103	16.2	▲0.1	27,009	19.8	▲2.1
AfD	Theo Taubmann	14,416	10.6	▼1.0	15,774	11.6	▼1.9
FW	Jochen Bergmann	10,430	7.6	▲4.5	10,420	7.6	▲5.0
Greens	Martin Pfeiffer	10,165	7.5	▲3.1	11,966	8.8	▲2.8
FDP	Claus Ehrhardt	6,480	4.8	▲0.7	11,399	8.4	▲0.6
Left	Ludwig Baumgartner	2,448	1.8	▼2.0	2,982	2.2	▼2.6
PARTEI	Sven Goller	1,954	1.4		1,199	0.9	▲0.1
dieBasis	Otto Gebelein	1,748	1.3		1,718	1.3	
Tierschutzpartei					1,548	1.1	▲0.2
ÖDP	Kay-Uwe Zenker	871	0.6	▼0.9	605	0.4	▼0.3
BP	Gunther Sedlmeyer	619	0.5		446	0.3	▼0.1
Pirates					429	0.3	0.0
Unabhängige					242	0.2	
Team Todenhöfer					214	0.2	
Volt					207	0.2	
Gesundheitsforschung					203	0.1	0.0
NPD					185	0.1	▼0.4
Bündnis C					126	0.1	
The III. Path					124	0.1	
V-Partei3					92	0.1	▼0.1
Humanists					82	0.1	
du.					73	0.1	
LKR					32	0.0	
MLPD					27	0.0	0.0
DKP					16	0.0	0.0
Informal votes		781			671		
Total valid votes		136,397			136,507		
Turnout		137,178	81.2	▲2.2			
CSU hold	Majority	43,060	31.6	▼7.8			

=== 2017 election ===
Federal election (2017): Kulmbach
Notes:	Blue background denotes the winner of the electorate vote. Pink background denotes a candidate elected from their party list. Yellow background denotes an electorate win by a list member, or other incumbent. A ✓ or ✗ denotes status of any incumbent, win or lose respectively.						
Party	Candidate	Votes	%	±%	Party votes	%	±%
CSU	✓ Emmi Zeulner	74,105	55.4	▼1.5	58,112	43.4	▼8.9
SPD	Thomas Bauske	21,494	16.1	▼6.7	23,675	17.7	▼3.8
AfD	Georg Hock	15,497	11.6	▲8.4	17,997	13.4	▼9.5
Greens	Markus Tutsch	5,880	4.4	▲0.4	7,966	5.9	▲0.7
FDP	Stefan Wolf	5,381	4.0	▲2.4	10,335	7.7	▲4.0
Left	Oswald Greim	5,057	3.8	▲0.8	6,431	4.8	▲1.2
FW	Klaus Purucker	4,199	3.1	▲0.2	3,560	2.7	▼0.2
Tierschutzpartei					1,203	0.9	▲0.2
PARTEI					1,006	0.8	
ÖDP	Thomas Müller	2,064	1.5	▲0.4	932	0.7	0.0
NPD					742	0.6	▼1.1
BP					514	0.4	▼0.2
Pirates					421	0.3	▼1.6
DM					247	0.2	
Gesundheitsforschung					199	0.1	
V-Partei³					191	0.1	
DiB					153	0.1	
BGE					150	0.1	
MLPD					51	0.0	0.0
DKP					17	0.0	
BüSo					10	0.0	0.0
Informal votes		1,395			1,160		
Total valid votes		133,677			133,912		
Turnout		135,072	79.0	▲8.1			
CSU hold	Majority	52,611	39.3	▲5.2			

=== 2013 election ===
Federal election (2013): Kulmbach
Notes:	Blue background denotes the winner of the electorate vote. Pink background denotes a candidate elected from their party list. Yellow background denotes an electorate win by a list member, or other incumbent. A ✓ or ✗ denotes status of any incumbent, win or lose respectively.						
Party	Candidate	Votes	%	±%	Party votes	%	±%
CSU	Emmi Zeulner	68,903	56.9	▼11.2	63,378	52.3	▲2.9
SPD	Simon Moritz	27,587	22.8	▲8.1	26,030	21.5	▲4.3
Greens	Valentin Motschmann	4,845	4.0	▼0.7	6,396	5.3	▼1.6
AfD	Georg Hock	3,829	3.2		4,800	4.0	
Left	Marko Müller	3,616	3.0	▼2.2	4,392	3.6	▼2.7
FW	Philipp Goletz	3,533	2.9		3,476	2.9	
Pirates	Bruno Kramm	2,212	1.8		2,316	1.9	▲0.1
NPD	Johannes Hühnlein	2,013	1.7	▼0.7	2,017	1.7	▼0.4
FDP	Stephan Otte	1,996	1.6	▼2.2	4,513	3.7	▼7.7
Tierschutzpartei					889	0.7	▲0.1
ÖDP	Thomas Karl Müller	1,430	1.2	▲0.1	856	0.7	▼0.2
BP		1,118	0.9		758	0.6	▲0.2
REP					554	0.5	▼0.5
DIE FRAUEN					307	0.3	
DIE VIOLETTEN					122	0.1	0.0
Party of Reason					120	0.1	
PRO					105	0.1	
RRP					31	0.0	▼0.5
MLPD					28	0.0	0.0
BüSo					12	0.0	▼0.1
Informal votes		1,225			1,207		
Total valid votes		121,082			121,100		
Turnout		122,307	70.9	▼3.2			
CSU hold	Majority	41,316	34.1	▼19.3			

=== 2009 election ===
Federal election (2009): Kulmbach
Notes:	Blue background denotes the winner of the electorate vote. Pink background denotes a candidate elected from their party list. Yellow background denotes an electorate win by a list member, or other incumbent. A ✓ or ✗ denotes status of any incumbent, win or lose respectively.						
Party	Candidate	Votes	%	±%	Party votes	%	±%
CSU	✓ Karl-Theodor zu Guttenberg	86,658	68.1	▲8.0	62,880	49.5	▼2.3
SPD	Claus Stenglein	18,717	14.7	▼11.3	21,863	17.2	▼9.5
Left	Corinna Croy	6,624	5.2	▲2.0	8,038	6.3	▲2.7
Greens	Hans-Dieter Herold	5,985	4.7	▲0.8	8,731	6.9	▲2.2
FDP	Joachim-Friedrich Unruh	4,885	3.8	▲0.1	14,520	11.4	▲3.8
NPD	Bernd Lorenz	3,027	2.4	▼0.8	2,682	2.1	▼0.2
Pirates					2,332	1.8	
REP					1,215	1.0	▼0.4
ÖDP	Tanja Och	1,407	1.1		1,091	0.9	
FAMILIE					1,045	0.8	▲0.1
Tierschutzpartei					827	0.7	
RRP					659	0.5	
BP					546	0.4	▲0.1
PBC					259	0.2	▼0.1
DIE VIOLETTEN					185	0.1	
CM					112	0.1	
DVU					59	0.0	
BüSo					48	0.0	0.0
MLPD					25	0.0	0.0
Informal votes		1,198			1384		
Total valid votes		127,303			127,117		
Turnout		128,501	74.1	▼5.2			
CSU hold	Majority	67,941	53.4	▲19.3			

=== 2005 election ===
Federal election (2005):Kulmbach
Notes:	Blue background denotes the winner of the electorate vote. Pink background denotes a candidate elected from their party list. Yellow background denotes an electorate win by a list member, or other incumbent. A ✓ or ✗ denotes status of any incumbent, win or lose respectively.						
Party	Candidate	Votes	%	±%	Party votes	%	±%
CSU	✓ Karl-Theodor zu Guttenberg	81,041	60.0	▼2.9	70,251	51.8	▼9.4
SPD	Claus Stenglein	35,160	26.1	▼2.6	36,213	26.7	▼1.0
Greens	Matthias Fleischer	5,226	3.9	▼0.5	6,385	4.7	▲0.3
FDP	Thomas Nagel	4,991	3.7	▲0.4	10,384	7.6	▲4.0
Left	Arno Pfaffenberger	4,308	3.2		4,876	3.6	▲3.0
NPD	Bernd Lorenz	4,241	3.1		3,185	2.3	▲1.8
REP					1,828	1.3	▲0.5
Familie					922	0.7	
BP					470	0.3	▲0.3
PBC					396	0.3	▲0.1
Feminist					369	0.3	▲0.2
GRAUEN					317	0.2	▲0.2
BüSo					86	0.1	▲0.1
MLPD					63	0.0	
Informal votes		2,691			1,913		
Total valid votes		134,967			135,745		
Turnout		137,658	79.3	▼3.4			
CSU hold	Majority	45,881	33.9				
