= Reckendorf station =

Railway station in Reckendorf, Germany

Reckendorf
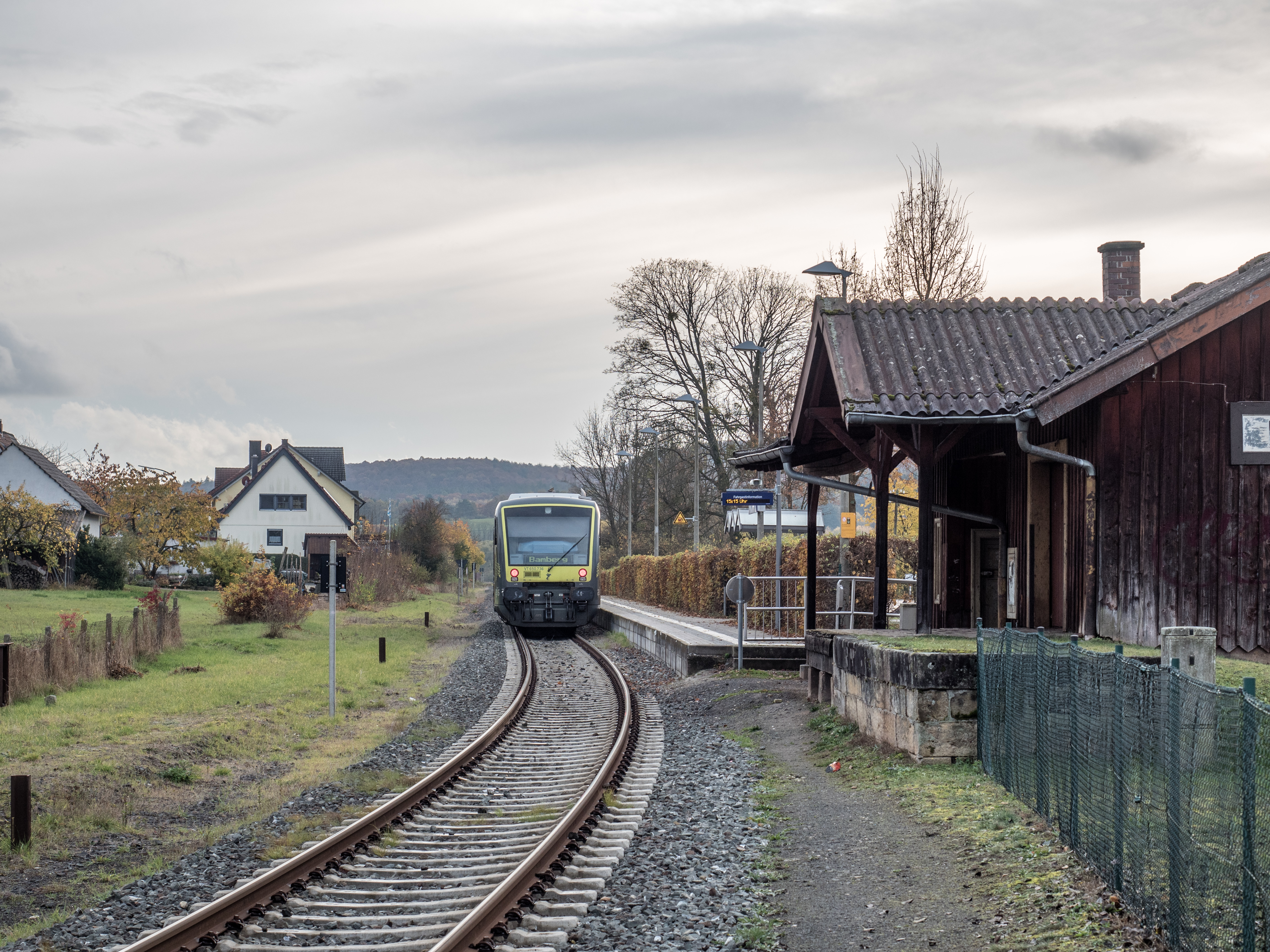
- 2016

General information
- Location: Bahnhofstraße; 96182 Reckendorf; Bavaria; Germany
- Coordinates: 50.0195°N 10.8340°E
- System: Hp
- Owner: Deutsche Bahn
- Operator: DB Netz; DB Station&Service
- Lines: Breitengüssbach–Maroldsweisach railway (KBS 826)
- Platforms: 1 side platform
- Tracks: 1
- Train operators: agilis
- Connections: RB 26

Construction
- Parking: yes
- Cycle facilities: yes
- Accessible: yes

Other information
- Station code: 5158
- DS100 code: NRDF
- IBNR: 8004971
- Category: 7
- Fare zone: VGN: 1122 and 1131
- Website: www.bahnhof.de

Services
Preceding station		Following station
Manndorf towards Ebern	RB 26	Baunach towards Bamberg
Location
- Location within Bavaria Location within Germany Location within Europe

Reckendorf station (German: Haltepunkt Reckendorf) is a railway station in the municipality of Reckendorf, located in the Bamberg district in Bavaria, Germany.
