= Oberhaid =

- Municipality
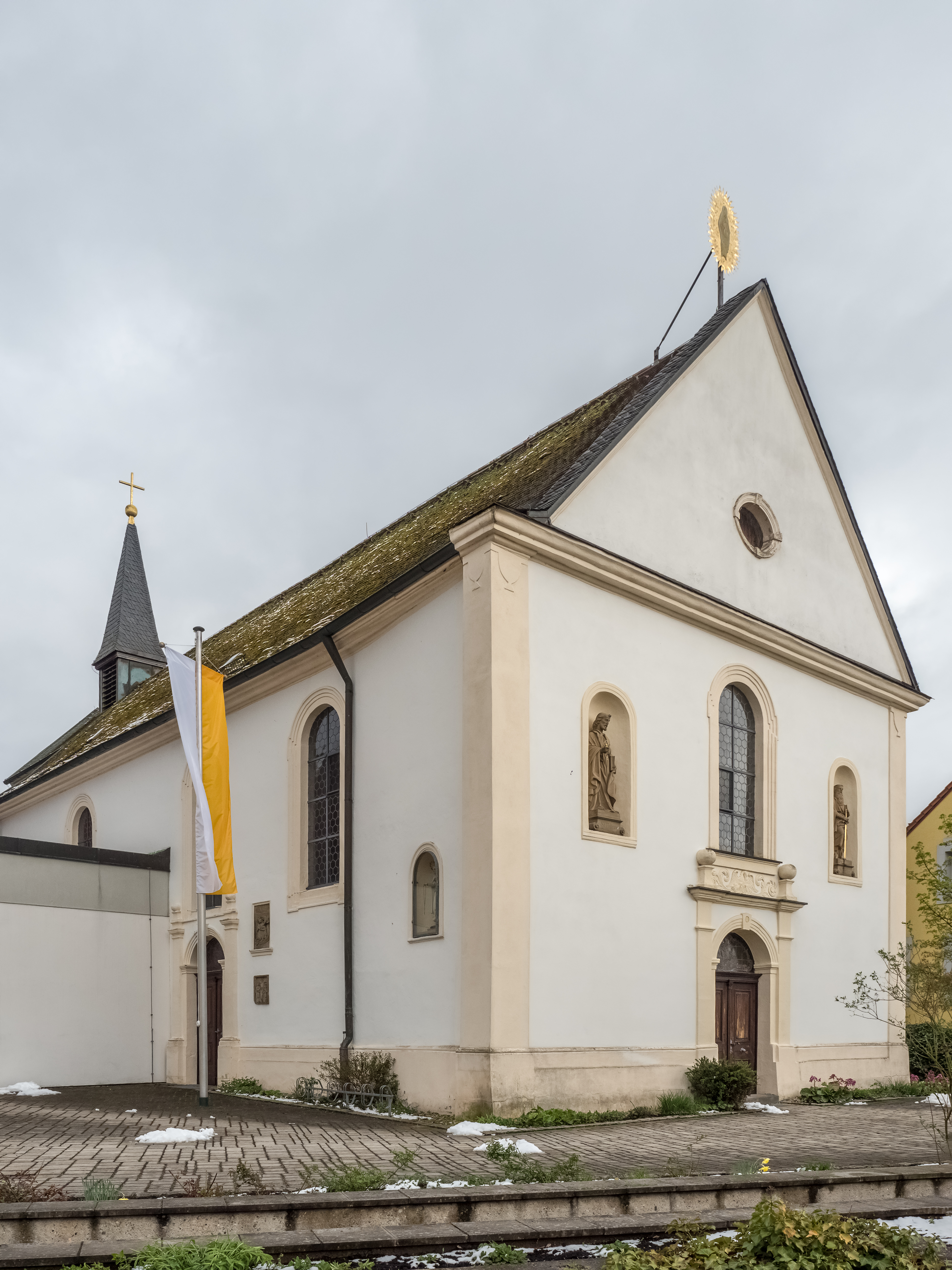
- Church of Saint Bartholomew

- Coat of arms

- Location of Oberhaid within Bamberg district
- Interactive map of Oberhaid
- Location within Germany Location within Bavaria
- Coordinates: 49°55′N 10°49′E
- Country: Germany
- State: Bavaria
- Admin. region: Oberfranken
- District: Bamberg
- Subdivisions: 5 Ortsteile

Government
  - Mayor (2020–26): Carsten Joneitis (SPD)

Area
  - Total: 27.05 km^{2} (10.44 sq mi)
- Elevation: 239 m (784 ft)

Population (2025-12-31)
  - Total: 4,561
  - Density: 168.6/km^{2} (436.7/sq mi)
- Time zone: UTC+01:00 (CET)
  - Summer (DST): UTC+02:00 (CEST)
- Postal codes: 96173
- Dialling codes: 09503
- Vehicle registration: BA
- Website: www.oberhaid.de

Oberhaid (German pronunciation: [ˈoːbɐhaɪt]) is a municipality in the Upper Franconian district of Bamberg.

== Geography ==
=== Location ===
The community lies roughly seven kilometres northwest of Bamberg. The highest elevations are the Spitzelberg in the west at 325 m, and the Semberg in the east at 393 m. The location in the Main Valley in the Haßberge Nature Park area is ideal for hikers and cyclists. The outlying centre of Unterhaid is the Bamberg district's lowest place at 230 m above sea level.

=== Neighbouring communities ===
Oberhaid borders on the municipal areas of Lauter, Bischberg and Viereth-Trunstadt, on the unincorporated area of Semberg and on the municipal areas of Baunach, Hallstadt and Bamberg. Oberhaid also borders on the community of Stettfeld and the town of Eltmann, which are both in the Haßberge district in Lower Franconia.

=== Constituent communities ===
Oberhaid's main and namesake centre is by far the biggest of its Gemeindeteile with a population of 3,432. The community furthermore has these outlying centres, each given here with its own population figure: Staffelbach with 843 inhabitants, Unterhaid with 421, Johannishof with 20 and Sandhof with 2.

== History ==
The Fulda Monastery already had property in the municipal area as early as the 8th century. The monastery at Michelsberg then expanded its landholdings in Oberhaid in the 13th century. The place therefore belonged to the High Monastery at Bamberg, and with the Reichsdeputationshauptschluss of 1803, the community passed to Bavaria.

=== Volunteer fire brigades ===
- Freiwillige Feuerwehr Oberhaid
- Freiwillige Feuerwehr Unterhaid
- Freiwillige Feuerwehr Staffelbach

=== Religion ===
Community's denominational breakdown:

- Roman Catholic: 3,919
- Evangelical Lutheran: 426
- other: 370

=== Amalgamations ===
In 1978, the formerly autonomous communities of Unterhaid and Staffelbach were amalgamated with Oberhaid.

=== Population development ===
Within municipal limits, 3,771 inhabitants were counted in 1970, 4,090 in 1987 and 4,775 in 2000. In January 2006 it was 4,718.

== Politics ==
=== Community council ===
The community council is made up of 17 members, listed here by party or voter community affiliation, and also with the number of seats that each holds:

- SPD: 7 seats
- CSU: 7 seats
- UBV/FW: 2 seats
- ÜL/CWG: 1 seat

(as of municipal election in 2008)

=== Mayor ===
The mayor is Carsten Joneitis (SPD).

=== Coat of arms ===
Oberhaid's arms might heraldically be described thus: Gules a wing sinister palewise argent emerging dexter therefrom an arm clad argent, the hand holding a Latin cross Or palewise, below dexter an inescutcheon, argent a cross sable.

=== Town partnership ===
There is a partnership with the community of Oberhain in Thuringia.

== Economy and infrastructure ==
=== Transport ===
- There is an Autobahn interchange on the A 70, Viereth-Trunstadt exit, towards Oberhaid.
- The Oberhaid railway station lies on the Bamberg–Schweinfurt line.
- Local public transportation is by bus connection on the Bamberg–Schweinfurt route with stops in Oberhaid, Unterhaid and Staffelbach.
