= Emmi Zeulner =

German politician (born 1987)

Emmi Zeulner MdB
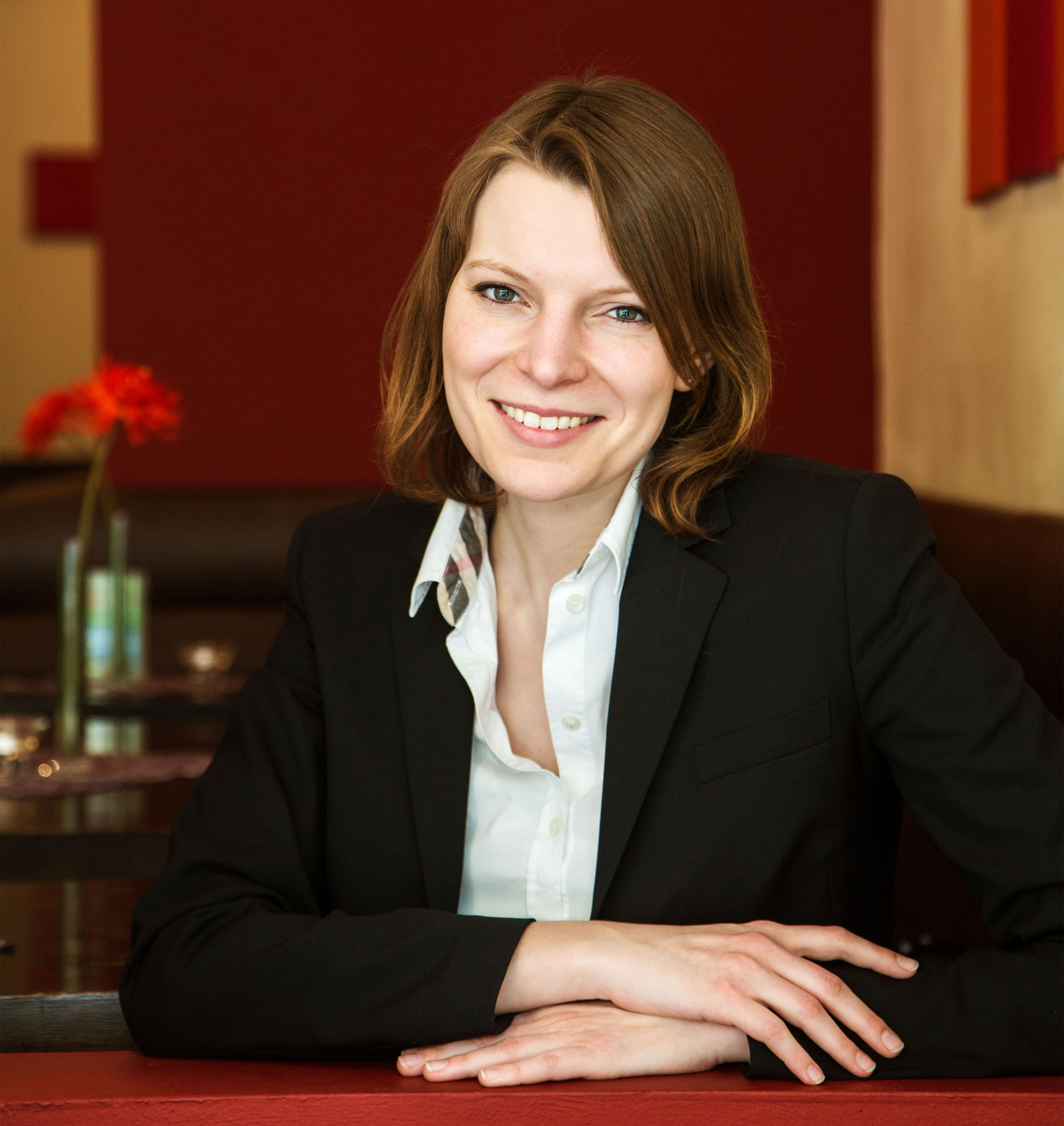
- Zeulner in 2013

Member of the Bundestag; for Kulmbach
- Incumbent
- Assumed office 22 October 2013
- Preceded by: Karl-Theodor zu Guttenberg (2011)

Personal details
- Born: 27 March 1987 (age 39) Lichtenfels, Bavaria, West Germany
- Party: Christian Social Union
- Spouse: Jürgen Baumgärtner
- Children: 1
- Education: University of Bamberg

Emmi Zeulner (born 27 March 1987) is a German nurse and politician of the Christian Social Union (CSU) who has been serving as a member of the Bundestag since 2013.

== Early life and education ==
Born in Lichtenfels, Bavaria, Germany, Zeulner is the daughter of an innkeeper from Degendorf. She became interested in politics at an early age after hearing it discussed in her father's tavern. In cultural events, she represented her town as a basket maker. After leaving school, she studied to become a nurse. In 2008 she was elected a local councillor.

== Member of the Bundestag (2013–present) ==
In January 2013, Zeulner was selected as the CSU candidate for the Kulmbach constituency, defeating two CSU candidates from neighbouring counties.

Results
| Candidate | Vote | |
| Candidate | 1 | 2 |
|---|---|---|
| Emmi Zeulner | 68 | 82 |
| Jörg Kunstmann | 71 | 76 |
| Alexander Hummel | 19 | - |

The Kulmbach constituency had been held by the party since a 1950 by-election and at the previous election her predecessor, the high-profile Karl-Theodor zu Guttenberg, had received the highest vote share in Germany. She held the seat at the 2013 election, receiving nearly 57% of the vote. She was the youngest CSU candidate in the election. After Mahmut Özdemir, she was the second youngest candidate elected.

As member of the Bundestag, Zeulner serves on the Health Committee, where she is her parliamentary group’s rapporteur on palliative and hospice medicine, drugs and other addictive substances as well as migration issues.

In the negotiations to form a coalition government under the leadership of Chancellor Angela Merkel following the 2017 federal elections, Zeulner was part of the working group on health policy, led by Hermann Gröhe, Georg Nüßlein and Malu Dreyer. In the negotiations to form a Grand Coalition under the leadership of Friedrich Merz's Christian Democrats (CDU together with the Bavarian CSU) and the Social Democratic Party (SPD) following the 2025 German elections, she was again part of the CDU/CSU delegation in the working group on health policy, this time led by Karl-Josef Laumann, Stephan Pilsinger and Katja Pähle.

== Other activities ==
- Magnus Hirschfeld Foundation, Member of the Board of Trustees (since 2018)
- Coburg University of Applied Sciences, Member of the Board of Trustees
