= Jürgen Baumgärtner =

German politician

Jürgen Baumgärtner MdL

Member of the Landtag of Bavaria; for Kronach, Lichtenfels
- Incumbent
- Assumed office 8 October 2013
- Preceded by: Ludwig von Lerchenfeld

Personal details
- Born: 24 April 1973 (age 53) Kronach, West Germany
- Party: Christian Social Union
- Spouse: Emmi Zeulner

Jürgen Baumgärtner (born 24 April 1973) is a German politician from the Christian Social Union of Bavaria and a former lieutenant colonel. He has been a member of the Landtag of Bavaria since 2013. Since 2018 he is the chairman of the working group for construction, housing and transportation of the Christian Social Union of Bavaria at the Bavarian parliament. Furthermore, he is the district chairman of the Frankenwald-CSU since 2010.

From his first election to the Landtag of Bavaria in 2013 he has been a member of the committee for economy, media, infrastructure, construction and transportation, energy and technology as well as of the committee for health and human services until the end of the legislative period in 2018. After his re-election in October 2018 he became the chairman of the working group for construction, housing and transportation of the Christian Social Union of Bavaria at the Bavarian parliament. He is the representative of the districts of Kronach and Lichtenfels in Upper Franconia, northern Bavaria, and a member of the district assembly of Kronach.

On 6 April 2020 it was announced that he would become the chief executive officer of a municipal enterprise forming the University of Kronach, named Lucas-Cranach-Campus referring to the famous painter Lucas Cranach the Elder who was born in Kronach.

In addition to his work at the parliament he is the chairman of the Frankenwaldgruppe, a local water supplier. Furthermore, he serves on the board of directors of the hospital Helios Frankenwaldklinik Kronach.
