= Bischberg =

- Municipality
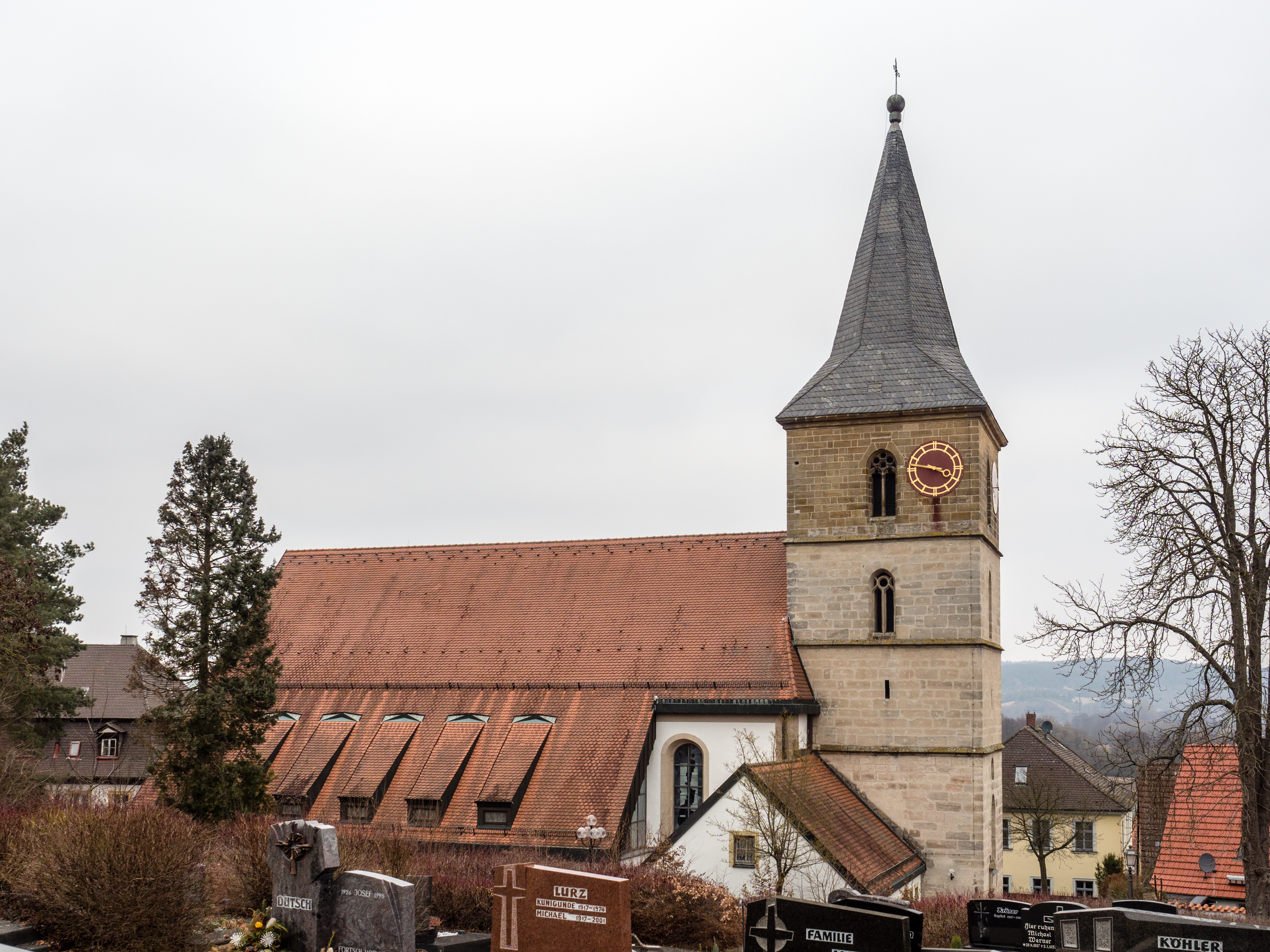
- Church of Saint Mark

- Coat of arms

- Location of Bischberg within Bamberg district
- Interactive map of Bischberg
- Location within Germany Location within Bavaria
- Coordinates: 49°54′N 10°49′E
- Country: Germany
- State: Bavaria
- Admin. region: Oberfranken
- District: Bamberg
- Subdivisions: 5 Ortsteile

Government
  - Mayor (2020–26): Michael Dütsch

Area
  - Total: 17.55 km^{2} (6.78 sq mi)
- Elevation: 236 m (774 ft)

Population (2025-12-31)
  - Total: 6,036
  - Density: 343.9/km^{2} (890.8/sq mi)
- Time zone: UTC+01:00 (CET)
  - Summer (DST): UTC+02:00 (CEST)
- Postal codes: 96120
- Dialling codes: 0951
- Vehicle registration: BA
- Website: www.bischberg.de

Bischberg (German pronunciation: [ˈbɪʃbɛʁk]) is a municipality in the Upper Franconian district of Bamberg lying at the forks of the rivers Regnitz and Main some 5 km west of Bamberg.

The community's name derives from Bischofsberg. Supposedly, the Bishop (Bischof in German) of Würzburg charged the community's founder with establishing a base at the important confluence of the rivers Regnitz and Main.

== Geography ==
Bischberg lies in the Upper Franconia West planning region. The nearest railway stations are the ones in Oberhaid, Bamberg and Hallstadt. The highest point of Bischberg is the Vogelberg hill with 320 m.

=== Constituent communities ===
Bischberg's constituent communities are Bischberg, Rothof, Trosdorf, Tütschengereuth and Weipelsdorf, each with an adjoining traditional rural land unit, known in German as a Gemarkung. Each has the same name as the neighbouring constituent community (it is traditional for a Gemarkung to be named after a town or village lying nearby).

=== Population figures ===
All population figures are as of 1 July 2016.

The first figure gives the total number of inhabitants, the second the number of inhabitants whose only residence is in the named place, the third the number of inhabitants whose main residence is in the named place and the fourth the number of inhabitants whose residence in the named place is a secondary one.

- Community of Bischberg as a whole: 6,340/5,832/225/283
- Bischberg: 4,510/4,124/268/218
- Trosdorf: 867/799/26/42
- Tütschengereuth: 712/673/27/12
- Weipelsdorf: 251/233/4/14

== History ==
Bischberg had its first documentary mention in 1013 as Biscoffesberge. The 1000st anniversary was celebrated in 2013 by the community of Bischberg.

Before Secularization, Bischberg belonged to the High Monastery at Bamberg. The most important landowner was the Michelsberg Monastery, which in the 18th century also held the local overlordship. Since the Reichsdeputationshauptschluss of 1803, the community has belonged to Bavaria. In the course of administrative reform in Bavaria, today's community came into being under the Gemeindeedikt (“Community Edict”) of 1818.

=== Timber floating ===
Bischberg's location at the forks of the rivers Regnitz and Main led to the community's becoming an important way station for the log drivers from the Franconian Forest. In log driving history, Bischberg is called the “second stop”.

The first stop for log drives coming from the Kronach area was Schwürbitz. The next station was then Bischberg. As the Regnitz's outflow into the Main strengthened this river considerably, twenty-seven of the small rafts that had been driven here downstream could be lashed together to make a Stück (“piece”, meaning a great timber raft), which could then be driven farther down the Main, and then by way of the Rhine all the way to the Netherlands. Later developments in road and railway transport, however, ended the need for these drives, and timber floating died out.

== Politics ==
The mayor is Michael Dütsch, elected in March 2020.

The community council is made up of 20 members, listed here by party or voter community affiliation, and also with the number of seats that each holds, since the 2020 local elections:

- CSU: 6
- Bürgerinitiative: 5
- SPD: 3
- Alliance 90/The Greens: 2
- Free Voters: 2
- Forum für Bischberg: 1
- Aktive Bürger: 1

== Education ==
The community of Bischberg has at its disposal the following educational institutions:

- Grundschule Bischberg (primary school)
- Hauptschule Bischberg

== Sport and leisure facilities ==
Besides the many football fields, the Hauptschule has a community indoor swimming pool with a 25-metre basin. Due to overhaul works, the pool will be closed from July 2017 for about 2 years.

=== Town partnership ===
Since August 1987, a partnership has existed with Montauban de Bretagne, France.

== Culture and sightseeing ==
The umbrella organization for Bischberg's clubs is the Ortskulturring Bischberg (OKR).

=== Sport and sport clubs ===
The RKB Solidarität Bischberg 1925 e.V. has many times been the German champion in outdoor cycle ball.

=== Buildings ===
The most striking building other than the church is the Unteres Schloss (“Lower Palatial Castle”) built in 1743 by Carl Maximilian Zollner von Brand on the occasion of his wedding. Today the building houses a Greek restaurant.

=== Regular events ===
The Bischberger Kirchweih, a church consecration festival, is held yearly from the Thursday before to the Monday after the first Sunday in September.

=== Culinary specialities ===
Besides the fish from the Main and Regnitz caught and marketed by the local fishermen's guild, the Brauerei zur Sonne, which is keeping the brewing business in the community alive as the last of five breweries that once made beer here, and whose beers are internationally recognized.

== Economy and infrastructure ==
=== Transport connections ===
- Bundesstraße 26 from Riedstadt (Groß-Gerau) to Bamberg
- Maintalautobahn A 70 from Schweinfurt to Bayreuth
- BA 36 local connection to Bamberg
- City bus connection line 906 Bamberg (operator: Bamberg Stadtbus) and OVF lines 601 Viereth-Trunstadt (operator: Basel Reisen), 641 Priesendorf (operator: Metzner Omnibus).

=== Volunteer fire brigades ===
- FFW Bischberg
- FFW Trosdorf
- FFW Tütschengereuth
- FFW Weipelsdorf
