= Baunach (Verwaltungsgemeinschaft) =

- Verwaltungsgemeinschaft
- Location of Baunach within Bamberg district
- Interactive map of Baunach
- Location within Germany Location within Bavaria
- Coordinates: 49°59′N 10°51′E
- Country: Germany
- State: Bavaria
- Admin. region: Upper Franconia
- District: Bamberg
- Seat: Baunach
- Subdivisions: 4 municipalities

Area
  - Total: 65.38 km^{2} (25.24 sq mi)

Population (2025-12-31)
  - Total: 8,297
  - Density: 126.9/km^{2} (328.7/sq mi)
- Time zone: UTC+01:00 (CET)
  - Summer (DST): UTC+02:00 (CEST)
- Website: www.vg-baunach.de

Baunach is a Verwaltungsgemeinschaft (municipal association) in the district of Bamberg in Bavaria, Germany. Its seat is in Baunach. It consists of the following municipalities:

1. Baunach
2. Gerach
3. Lauter
4. Reckendorf
