= Breitengüßbach–Dietersdorf railway =

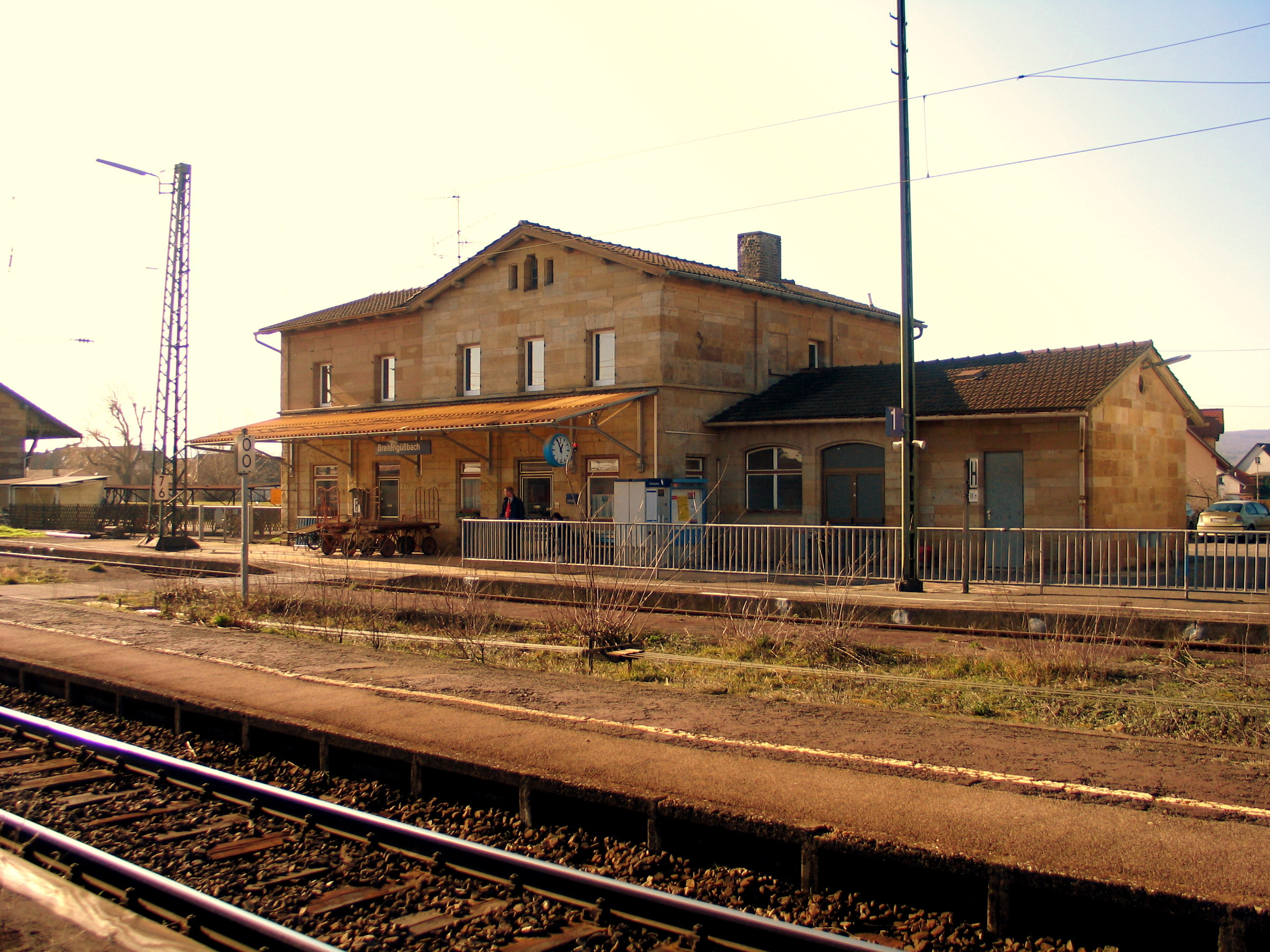
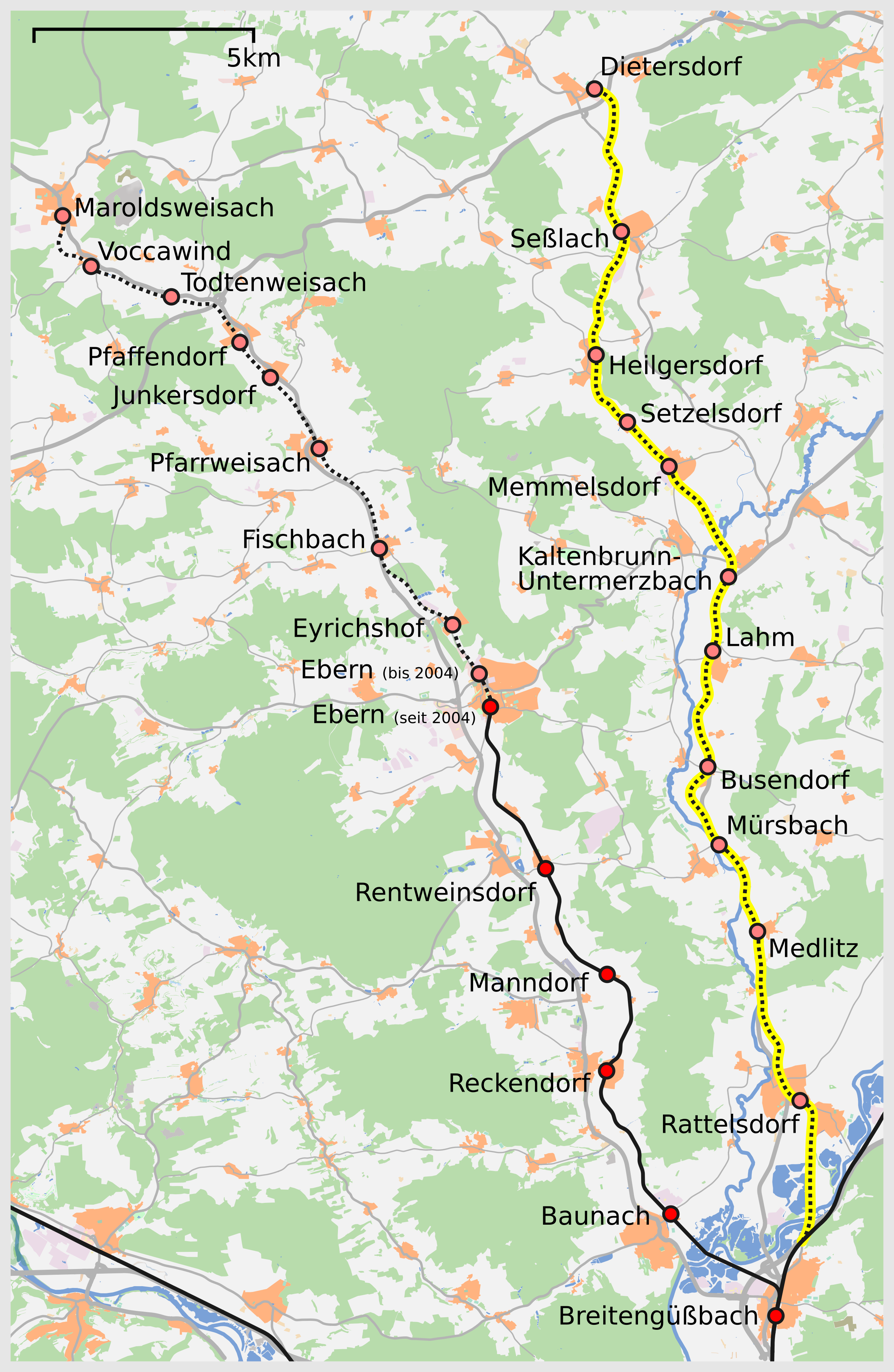
- Breitengüßbach

Overview
- Line number: 5105

Technical
- Line length: 31.8 km (19.8 mi)
- Track gauge: 1,435 mm (4 ft 8 1/2 in)
- Minimum radius: 300 m (984 ft)
- Maximum incline: 1 %

The Breitengüßbach–Dietersdorf railway was a single-tracked branch line in the province of Upper Franconia in Bavaria, southern Germany. It branched off from the main line from Bamberg to Hof, northeast of Breitengüßbach station, only a few hundred yards after the branch line to Ebern–Maroldsweisach, and headed north into the lower reaches of the Itz valley. The line was taken into service on 1 October 1913.

For the first 20 kilometres it followed the course of the Itz to Kaltenbrunn. From there it ran into the Alster and Rodach valleys towards Seßlach and Dietersdorf.

== History ==
The line was taken into service on 1 October 1913. A link line to the Itzgrundbahn, which terminated at Rossach only 6.7 kilometres from Kaltenbrunn, was considered but it was never implemented. The reasons were, on the one hand that the existing, but somewhat longer main line from Bamberg via Lichtenfels to Hof, which was also just a few kilometres away, ran almost parallel to it and wanted no competition. On the other hand, the Itzgrundbahn ran through the Duchy of Coburg but the line to Dietersdorf was in Bavarian territory. After the annexation of Coburg by Bavaria, the gap in the network foundered due to costs.

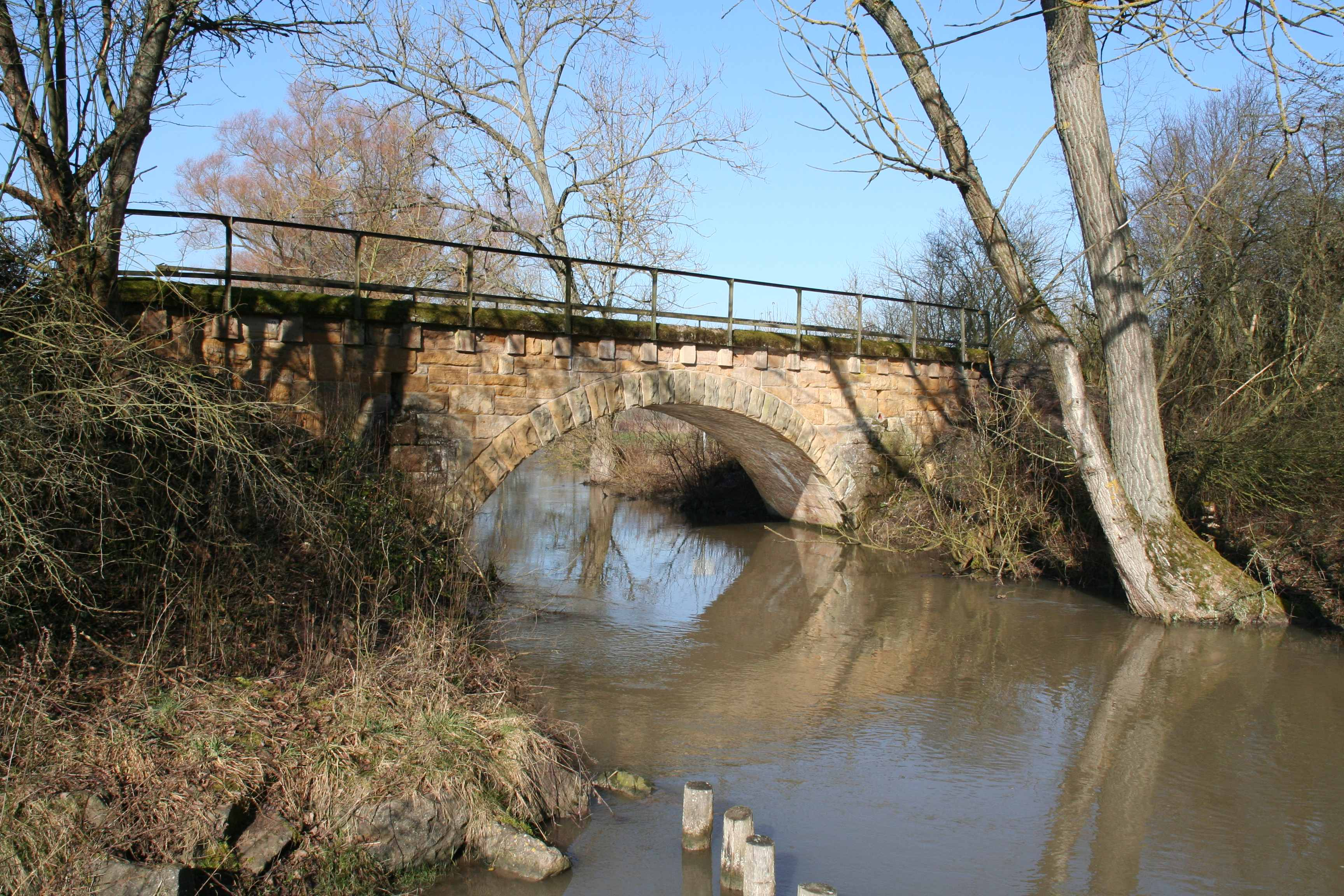
Bridge over the Rodach at Seßlach

A link to Thuringian Lindenau, also only six kilometres from Dietersdorf, where the narrow gauge railway from Hildburghausen ended, also failed to materialise.

The journey time for the four pairs of passenger trains in 1970 was an hour. Passenger services were withdrawn on 28 September 1975; on 27 September 1981 the line was closed completely. Between August 1982 and March 1983 the line was completely dismantled and much of it nowadays is a cycle path.

== See also ==
- Royal Bavarian State Railways
- Bavarian branch lines
- List of closed railway lines in Bavaria

== Sources ==
- Wolfgang Bleiweis, Stefan Goldschmidt und Bernd Schmitt: Eisenbahn im Coburger Land. Resch Druck, Coburg 1996, ISBN 3-9802748-4-5
- Stefan Goldschmidt, Thomas Standke: Lokalbahn Breitengüßbach - Dietersdorf. Eisenbahn-Fachbuch-Verlag, 2013, ISBN 978-3-944237-08-4
