= Kemmern =

- Municipality
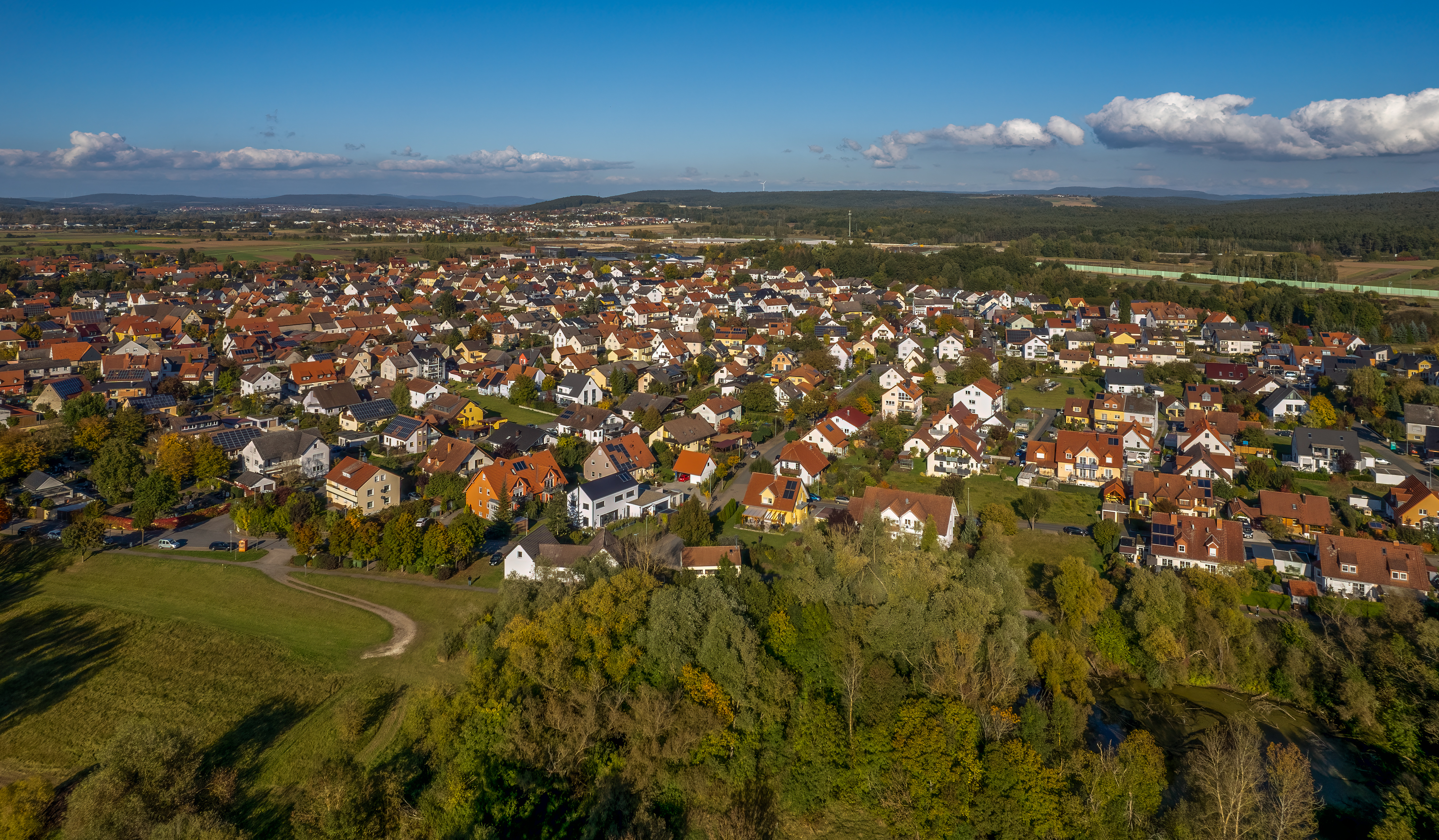
- Aerial view of Kemmern

- Coat of arms

- Location of Kemmern within Bamberg district
- Interactive map of Kemmern
- Location within Germany Location within Bavaria
- Coordinates: 49°57′N 10°52′E
- Country: Germany
- State: Bavaria
- Admin. region: Oberfranken
- District: Bamberg

Government
  - Mayor (2020–26): Rüdiger Gerst (CSU)

Area
  - Total: 8.27 km^{2} (3.19 sq mi)
- Elevation: 237 m (778 ft)

Population (2025-12-31)
  - Total: 2,487
  - Density: 301/km^{2} (779/sq mi)
- Time zone: UTC+01:00 (CET)
  - Summer (DST): UTC+02:00 (CEST)
- Postal codes: 96164
- Dialling codes: 09544
- Vehicle registration: BA
- Website: www.kemmern.de

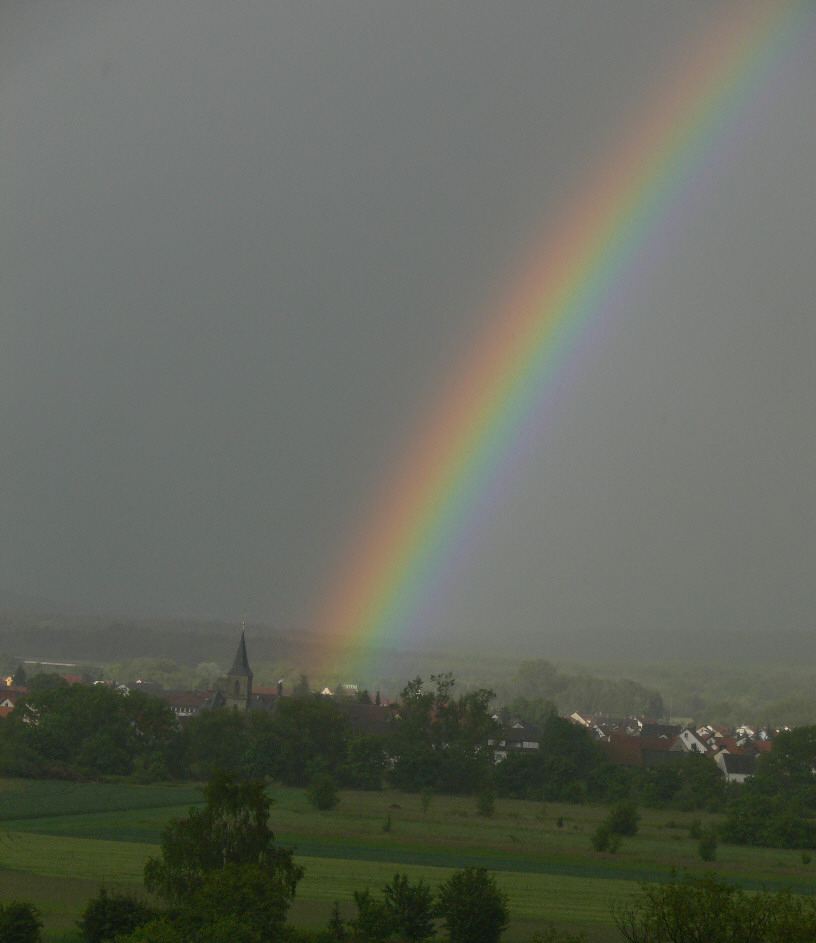
Rainbow over Kemmern

Kemmern (German pronunciation: [ˈkɛmɐn]) is a municipality in the Upper Franconian district of Bamberg in Bavaria, southern Germany.

== Geography ==
The municipality of Kemmern is situated at an elevation of approximately 245 meters on the Main River, seven kilometers north of Bamberg at the foot of the Haßberge range. It belongs to the Upper Franconia-West region in the Upper Main Valley. Kemmern is nestled in an historic cultural landscape with a path system from the High Middle Ages. Many hiking and cycling paths connect Kemmern to places of interest to visitors (such as the Main Valley, the Haßberge, the Steigerwald [forest], the "Franconian Switzerland" and the world heritage city of Bamberg).

Although the municipality is not beset with heavy through traffic, the residential municipality of Kemmern is connected to the long-distance road network (Bundesstraßen 4 and 173).

The municipality has one of the traditional rural land units, known in German as Gemarkungen, also named Kemmern (it is traditional for a Gemarkung to be named after a town or village lying nearby).

== History ==
Kemmern's settlement history is very old and reaches far back into the first millennium BC, as shown by the origins of the Helenenkapelle (chapel) on the Semberg, which was a worshipping place as far back as Celtic times. In the Early Middle Ages, the border between the Germanic- and Slavic-settled areas ran through what is now known as Kemmern. Bearing witness to the Germanic-Frankish presence are the Germanic townsites – now forsaken – of Dertheim and Schiring. The earlier Bürg may have had Slavic beginnings as an important refuge and worshipping place for the Main Wends.

The first time that Kemmern was mentioned in writing was in a document from 26 October 1017 as Camerin in the Radenzgau (a county roughly corresponding to today's Upper Franconia). In this document, Emperor Heinrich II acknowledges an exchange agreement whereby, along with Erlangen and Forchheim also, among other things, four fishermen at Kemmern were transferred by Bishop Heinrich of Würzburg to Bishop Eberhard of Bamberg.

In the centuries that followed up until Secularization in 1803, Kemmern remained an Obleidorf (from Mediaeval Latin oblaia, an old term for things donated to spiritual institutions or monasteries; Dorf is "village" in German) of the Bamberg Cathedral Chapter, but it nevertheless had at its disposal quite early on a definite measure of autonomy. So Kemmern could deal with its local business under a regulation, the village charter, which required no lordly sanction. For its protection, Kemmern had at its disposal a water-filled moat and three gatehouses. In the German Peasants' War in 1525, Kemmerners actively fought on the rebels' sides. In the winter of 1631-1632, Kemmern was beset by Swedish troops. How much suffering the Thirty Years' War brought Kemmern can be seen in what had happened by 1638 in the cathedral chapter households, of which there were 68, and of which only 26 were still occupied by this time.

In the Seven Years' War from 1756 to 1763, Kemmern lay many times under quartering by various Imperial troops as well as under Prussian invasions and quartering, since the Prince-Bishop of Bamberg had chosen to side with Austria.

With the Reichsdeputationshauptschluss of 1803, the municipality passed to Bavaria. In the course of administrative reform in Bavaria, today's municipality came into being under the Gemeindeedikt ("municipality Edict") of 1818. For the 2,600 or so people who lived here then, Kemmern had at its disposal important institutions for basic services.

Kemmern has been an autonomous parish since 1710. Between 1978 and 1980, the Roman Catholic parish of St. Peter and Paul was expanded.

In these same years, floodwater control measures were undertaken. Because Kemmern lies on the Main, flooding is an ongoing threat. There were major events of this nature in February 1909 and December 1967 which showed how serious the problem could be. However, an excavation designed to forestall flooding was built between 1978 and 1980 to safeguard the municipality from this natural hazard.

Since 1995, the municipality core has been undergoing an overhaul as part of a programme to promote municipal building. The municipality has been receiving help from both the state and the European Union for this.

=== Population development ===
Within municipal limits, 1,923 inhabitants were counted in 1970, 2,188 in 1987 and 2,565 in 2000. On 31 December 2005 it was 2,659 and on 31 December 2006 it was 2,592.

=== Religion ===
- Roman Catholic: 2230
- Evangelical Lutheran: 263
- Other: 166

== Politics ==
Municipal council consists of the directly elected mayor and 14 councillors (9 CSU, 5 UBB, 1 SPD). The mayor since 2020 Rüdiger Gerst.

Kemmern is an autonomous unified municipality without any other Ortsteile.

In 1999, municipal tax revenue, converted to euros, amounted to €1,530,000 of which business taxes (net) amounted to €89,247.

Household income in 2007 amounted to €4,000,000.

== Economy and infrastructure ==
The current municipal tax collection rates amount to:

- Basic tax A: 300%
- Basic tax B: 300%
- Business tax: 310%

=== Economy ===
According to official statistics, there were 65 workers on the social welfare contribution rolls working in producing businesses in 1998, and in trade and transport 33. In other areas, 50 workers on the social welfare contribution rolls were employed, and 949 such workers worked from home. In processing businesses there was one business, and in construction two. Furthermore, in 1999, there were 19 agricultural operations with a working area of 219 ha, of which 171 ha was cropland.

=== Education ===
In 2007, the following institutions existed in Kemmern:

- 100 kindergarten places with 79 children (Katholischer Kindergarten St. Maria)
- Primary school with 9 teachers and 117 pupils
- Municipal library St. Peter und Paul at the town hall
