= Breitengüßbach =

- Municipality
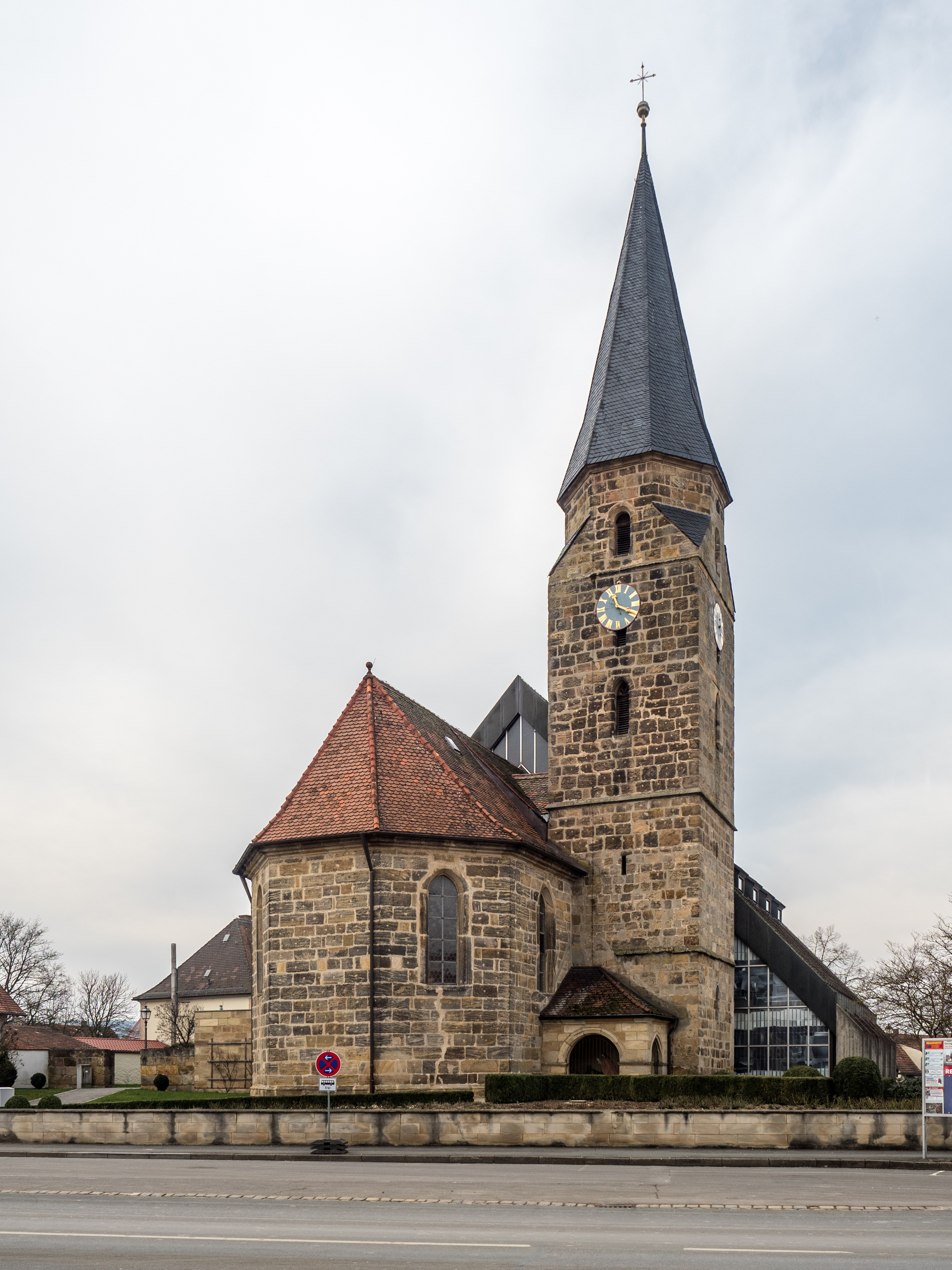
- Church of Saint Leonhard

- Coat of arms

- Location of Breitengüßbach within Bamberg district
- Interactive map of Breitengüßbach
- Location within Germany Location within Bavaria
- Coordinates: 49°58′17″N 10°53′30″E
- Country: Germany
- State: Bavaria
- Admin. region: Oberfranken
- District: Bamberg

Government
  - Mayor (2020–26): Sigrid Reinfelder

Area
  - Total: 16.86 km^{2} (6.51 sq mi)
- Elevation: 245 m (804 ft)

Population (2025-12-31)
  - Total: 4,441
  - Density: 263.4/km^{2} (682.2/sq mi)
- Time zone: UTC+01:00 (CET)
  - Summer (DST): UTC+02:00 (CEST)
- Postal codes: 96149
- Dialling codes: 09544
- Vehicle registration: BA
- Website: www.breitenguessbach.de

Breitengüßbach (or Breitengüssbach) is a municipality in the Upper Franconian district of Bamberg in Bavaria. It was first mentioned as Gusibach and as belonging to the royal court at Hallstadt in an Imperial document issued between 812 and 830.

== History ==
=== Name’s meaning ===
As to the name's origin, there is no agreement. The Old High German word guza (“pour”) could refer to Gießbach, but since the neighbouring community of Hohengüßbach does not lie on a brook (Bach means “brook” in German), the name might also have come from the names Gosbert or Götz. The name in its current form crops up only in 1750, and only in the mid-19th century did it gain legal legitimacy.

=== 9th to 17th centuries ===
After Breitengüßbach's first mention as Gusibach in the early 9th century (about 812) and as being owned by the royal court at Hallstadt, Emperor Heinrich II donated the royal court along with Güßbach upon the founding of the Bishopric of Bamberg in 1007 to the Bamberg Church as the bishop's demesne. Already by the first half of the 13th century, Breitengüßbach had its own House of God – St. Leonhard. In 1392, Güßbach was separated from the parish of Hallstadt and was granted its own parish rights.

The Güßbachers gave themselves a new village constitution in 1594, laying the basis for the community's administration for centuries to come. The schoolmaster, the smith, the barber-surgeon, the herdsman and a midwife were hired and salaried by the community. The community's own communal house, a community smithy and even a public bathhouse were all available in the community. In the Thirty Years' War, on 8 February 1633, half of Güßbach was left in rubble and ashes.

=== 18th and 19th centuries ===
In 1750 came the first use of the name Breitengüßbach. Before Secularization, Breitengüßbach belonged to the High Monastery at Bamberg. Since the Reichsdeputationshauptschluss of 1803, the community has belonged to Bavaria. In the course of administrative reform in Bavaria, today's community came into being under the Gemeindeedikt (“Community Edict”) of 1818.

=== 20th century to present ===
World War I did not change the overall appearance of the locality and the farming community structure much. Also, World War II did not touch the community gravely.

After World War II, new life slowly but steadily began to stir. A gymnasium was built, watermains and sewerage were laid, and a filtration plant was built. A new eight-grade elementary school came into being, and a sports centre was opened. Extensive and attractive building areas were laid out, among them a vast commercial area. A local recreational forest was bought and extended. All this fulfilled the requirements for the community to busy itself welcoming many newcomers.

== Community structure ==
In the course of administrative reform, Hohengüßbach was amalgamated with Breitengüßbach in 1972, as were Unteroberndorf and Zückshut in 1978.

Breitengüßbach was classed as a small centre. By converting the former schoolhouse in the middle of the community into a town hall in 1979, the basis was laid for an administration close to the townsfolk.

== Constituent communities ==
Breitengüßbach's main and namesake centre is by far the biggest of its Ortsteile with a population of 3,393. The community furthermore has these outlying centres, each given here with its own population figure:

- Hohengüßbach: 196
- Leimershof: 19
- Unteroberndorf: 719
- Zückshut: 372

as of 1 January 2005

== Politics ==
The first mayor is Sigrid Reinfelder from the Unabhängiger Bürgerblock (UBB).

The community council is made up of 16 members, listed here by party or voter community affiliation, and also with the number of seats that each holds, since the 2020 local elections:

- Unabhängiger Bürgerblock: 5
- CSU: 4
- Alliance 90/The Greens: 2
- SPD: 2
- Freie Wählergemeinschaft Zückshut (FWZ): 1
- Freie Wählergemeinschaft Unteroberndorf (FWU): 1
- Wählergemeinschaft Hohengüßbach (WGH): 1

=== Coat of arms ===
Breitengüßbach's arms can heraldically be described thus: Party per pale sinister argent and gules, in argent a farmer with waistcoat and kneebreeches azure, shirt and stockings gules and pointed hat sable, holding in his right hand a staff sable with ribband gules, in gules a fess Or, thereover a pale argent.

The municipal arms go back to a print of a municipal seal from 1796 which shows a farmer holding a staff in his hand. It possibly refers to a village judge, or Schultheiß (roughly, “sheriff”). The flanking field shows the arms once borne by the von Gusbach noble family who lived in Breitengüßbach, but who died out in the 15th century.

== Transport ==
=== Road ===
Breitengüßbach lies on Bundesstraße 4, running from Hamburg to Nuremberg, Bundesautobahn 73 from Suhl to Nuremberg, Staatsstraße 2197 and Bundesstraße 279.

Distances to major towns and cities in the area are as follows: Bamberg (10 km), Bad Staffelstein (18 km), Ebern (17 km), Scheßlitz (12 km), Coburg (37 km), Lichtenfels (25 km) and Haßfurt (roughly 35 km).

=== Railway ===
Breitengüßbach was first connected to the railway network by the Ludwig South-North Railway. At Breitengüßbach, the Breitengüßbach–Maroldsweisach railway line branches off from the Bamberg–Hof railway. The Breitengüßbach–Dietersdorf railway was closed in the 1980s.
