= Gerach =

- Municipality
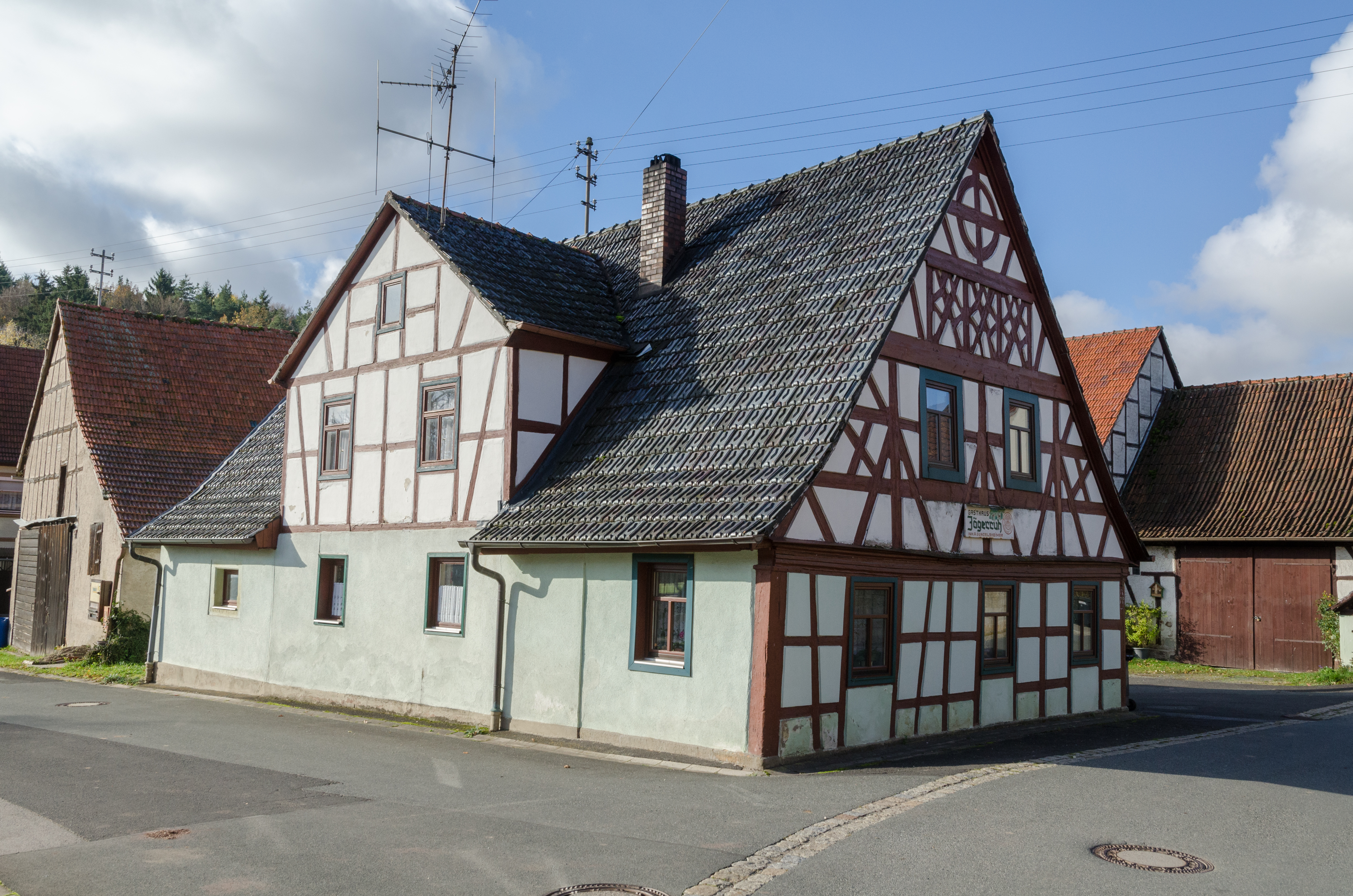
- Typical old timber-framed house in Mauschendorf

- Coat of arms

- Location of Gerach within Bamberg district
- Interactive map of Gerach
- Location within Germany Location within Bavaria
- Coordinates: 50°2′N 10°48′E
- Country: Germany
- State: Bavaria
- Admin. region: Oberfranken
- District: Bamberg
- Municipal assoc.: Baunach

Government
  - Mayor (2020–26): Sascha Günther (CSU)

Area
  - Total: 7.78 km^{2} (3.00 sq mi)
- Elevation: 276 m (906 ft)

Population (2025-12-31)
  - Total: 1,039
  - Density: 134/km^{2} (346/sq mi)
- Time zone: UTC+01:00 (CET)
  - Summer (DST): UTC+02:00 (CEST)
- Postal codes: 96161
- Dialling codes: 09544
- Vehicle registration: BA
- Website: www.vg-baunach.de

Gerach (German pronunciation: [ˈɡeːʁax]) is a municipality in the Upper Franconian district of Bamberg and a member of the administrative community (Verwaltungsgemeinschaft) of Baunach. It lies in the Naturpark Haßberge (nature park) roughly 20 km north of Bamberg and roughly 10 km south of Ebern.

== History ==
Gerach had its first documentary mention on 10 March 1396, although the settlement is believed to be considerably older. Through many sales and donations, Gerach passed through many hands over the following centuries, belonging for a while to the Lords of Schaumburg, and those of Rotenhan. In 1750, the community passed to the prince-Bishopric of Bamberg. As a part of the High Monastery at Bamberg, Gerach fell under Bavarian rule when Secularization came in 1803. With the border adjustments made in 1810, it passed to the Grand Duchy of Würzburg, with which it once again passed to Bavaria in 1814, this time for good.

== Politics ==
The mayor is Sascha Günther (CSU), elected in 2020.

The community council is made up of 8 members, listed here by party or voter community affiliation, and also with the number of seats that each hold, since the 2020 local elections:

- CSU 3
- Unabhängige Wählergemeinschaft: 3
- SPD: 2

=== Municipal taxes ===
In 1999, municipal tax revenue, converted to euros, amounted to €506,000 of which business taxes (net) amounted to €173,000.

=== Coat of arms ===
Gerach's arms might heraldically be described thus: Party per pale sable and argent, sable a cock sinister Or, argent a bend sinister wavy gules above which a mullet gules.

The municipal arms recall the noble family of Rotenhan (which means “Red Cock” rather than the golden one seen in the arms), the village's owners from the 15th to 18th century. At the same time, the cock is also Saint Vitus’s faunal emblem, and it is to him that the local Catholic church is consecrated.

== Sightseeing ==
The Late Romanesque Kirche Sankt Vitus is said to be one of Franconia’s oldest churches and parts of it date from the 12th century. A relief on the church door shows the martyr Vitus praying in a kettle of hot oil. In the church square is found a warriors’ memorial.

When touring the village, one can see historic timber-frame houses, stone field crosses and Felsenkeller (“cliff cellars”) in the sandstone hill. In the outlying centre of Mauschendorf stands the Zur Jägersruh inn, which is protected as a monument, and which is one of the district's oldest inns.

Gerach took part successfully many times in the contest Unser Dorf soll schöner werden (“Our village ought to become lovelier”).

== Population development ==
| Year | Inhabitants | Year | Inhabitants |
|---|---|---|---|
| 1961 | 796 | 1996 | 1,000 |
| 1970 | 905 | 1997 | 1,007 |
| 1987 | 927 | 1998 | 998 |
| 1989 | 962 | 1999 | 1,019 |
| 1991 | 957 | 2000 | 1,018 |
| 1993 | 965 | 2001 | 1,014 |
| 1994 | 955 | 2002 | 1,000 |
| 1995 | 967 | 2003 | 1,010 |
