= Zapfendorf =

- Municipality
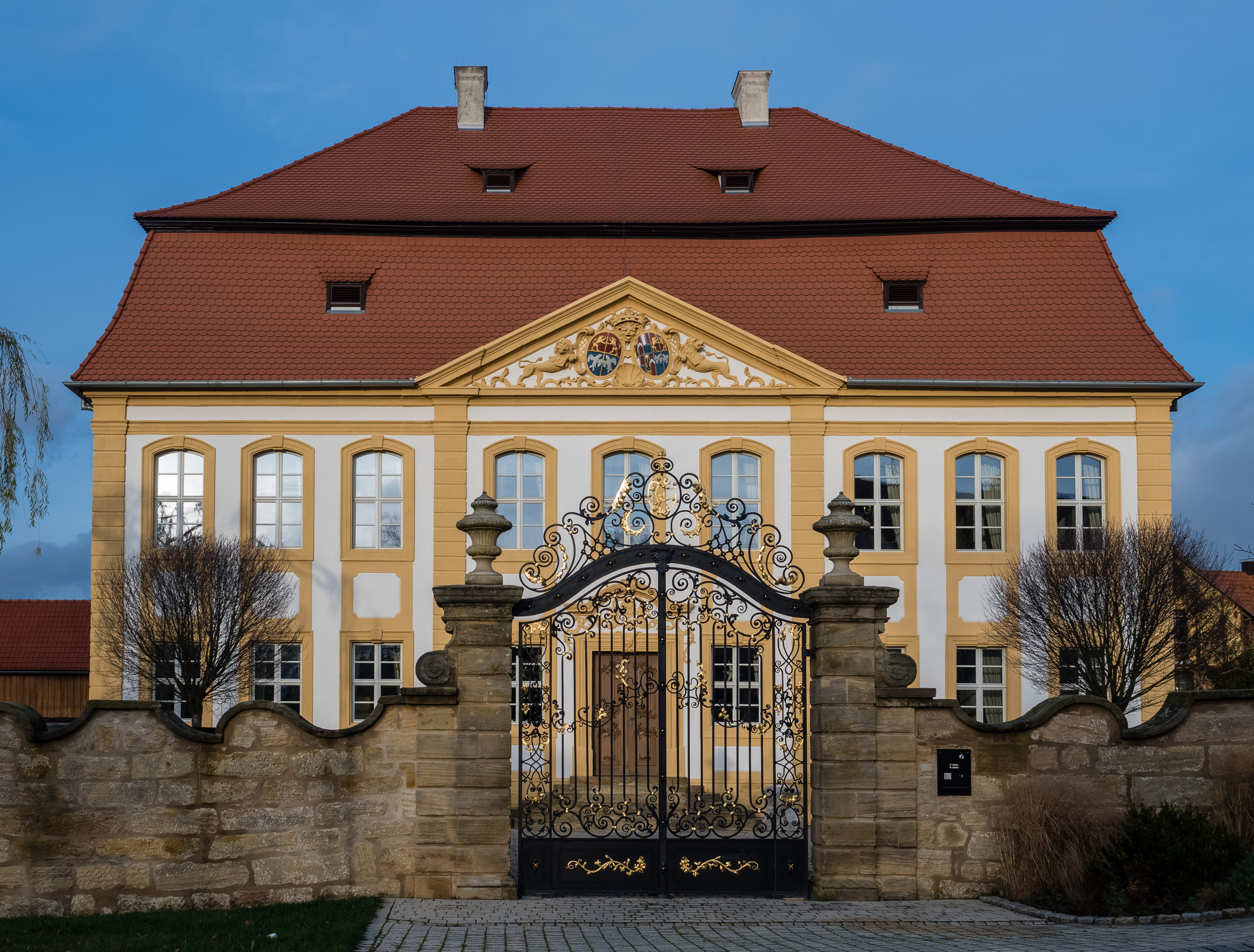
- Unterleiterbach Palace

- Coat of arms

- Location of Zapfendorf within Bamberg district
- Interactive map of Zapfendorf
- Location within Germany Location within Bavaria
- Coordinates: 50°3′33″N 11°33′33″E
- Country: Germany
- State: Bavaria
- Admin. region: Oberfranken
- District: Bamberg
- Subdivisions: 9 Ortsteile

Government
  - Mayor (2020–26): Michael Senger

Area
  - Total: 30.54 km^{2} (11.79 sq mi)
- Elevation: 248 m (814 ft)

Population (2025-12-31)
  - Total: 4,927
  - Density: 161.3/km^{2} (417.8/sq mi)
- Time zone: UTC+01:00 (CET)
  - Summer (DST): UTC+02:00 (CEST)
- Postal codes: 96199
- Dialling codes: 09547
- Vehicle registration: BA
- Website: www.zapfendorf.de

Zapfendorf (German pronunciation: [ˈtsapfn̩ˌdɔʁf]) is a municipality with market rights in the Upper Franconian district of Bamberg in Bavaria, Germany with roughly 5,000 inhabitants.

== Geography ==
Lying as it did on a transport corridor along the Main running east–west as well as from Thuringia to Bavaria, Zapfendorf in the Main Valley was always a way station. On the Main itself, log drivers floated wood from the Frankenwald (forest) down to the Rhine and even as far as Rotterdam.

=== Population development ===
On 30 June 2006, Zapfendorf had 5,063 inhabitants, and on 31 December 2006, 5,083. In the next half year, the figure fell to 5,016 by 30 June 2007.

=== Constituent municipalities ===
Zapfendorf's main and namesake centre is by far the biggest of its Gemeindeteile with a population of 2,796. The municipality furthermore has these outlying centres, each given here with its own population figure:

- Kirchschletten 113
- Lauf 689
- Oberleiterbach 254
- Oberoberndorf 97
- Reuthlos 93
- Roth 68
- Sassendorf 269
- Unterleiterbach 630
- Weihersmühle 7

(as of 30 June 2005)

== History ==
The place was already settled quite early on, as witnessed by finds from the Bronze Age. Zapfendorf had its first documentary mention in 904. The name stems from “Zapfo” (Dorf meaning “village” in German), and may well refer to an innkeeper who tapped beer (zapfen means “draw”, as from a beer keg, in German). The original overlords were the Meranians, who were followed by the Truhendingens, who in turn sold the municipality in 1390 to the High Monastery at Bamberg. Since the Reichsdeputationshauptschluss of 1803, the municipality has belonged to Bavaria.

On 1 April 1945, a munitions train on a siding in Zapfendorf was struck by low-level bombers. Burning parts of this train rained down on the village and destroyed it utterly, leaving only a few houses unscathed.

In 1955, Zapfendorf was designated a market. In 1972, the municipalities of Lauf, Oberleiterbach, Kirchschletten, Sassendorf, Reuthlos, Roth and Oberoberndorf were amalgamated with Zapfendorf, as was Unterleiterbach in 1978. Until 1972, Zapfendorf belonged to the Staffelstein district before it passed to the Bamberg district. Today, it is classed as a small centre in the Upper Franconia-West region.

== Politics ==
The first mayor is Michael Senger from the Wählergemeinschaft Sassendorf, elected in 2020.

The municipality council is made up of 16 members, listed here by party or voter municipality affiliation, and also with the number of seats that each holds:

- CSU 7
- VU (Wählergruppe Vereintes Umland) 5
- SPD 2
- WS (Wählergruppe Sassendorf) 1
- independent 1

=== Coat of arms ===
Blazon of Zapfendorf's arms: Party per fess, in chief gules two cloakpins Or in saltire, in base Or a demi-lion rampant sable issuant from the base armed and langued gules, debruised by a riband argent.

In the upper part the cloakpins refer to the significant archaeological discoveries made in the village, while the colours of red and gold refer to the arms of the former owners, the counts of Truhendingen. The lower part contains a version of the lion of Bamberg (German: Bamberger Löwe), the arms of the Prince-Bishopric of Bamberg, the later owner.

== Established businesses ==
In Zapfendorf is found Werk IV of the Bayerische Milchindustrie eGmbH (BMI for short, the “Bavarian Milk Industry”), which was founded in 1952 with the goal of processing and marketing the excess low-fat milk yield.

Within Zapfendorf's municipal limits, one brewery may still be found, the Brauerei Hennemann in the outlying centre of Unterleiterbach. Until a few years ago, the Drei Kronen brewery had also been brewing in Zapfendorf. In Unterleiterbach, there was until the mid-1990s another brewery, the Brauerei Mahkorn.

== Sightseeing ==
In the market town of Zapfendorf stand the following points of interest:

- Valentinskapelle (chapel) by Johann Jakob Michael Küchel
- Schloss Unterleiterbach (castle) in Unterleiterbach
- St.-Laurentius-Kirche (church) in Oberleiterbach with settler Ivo Hennemann's grave, from 1859 to 1897 he was a hermit on the Staffelberg (Lichtenfels district), and the poet Joseph Victor von Scheffel’s friend
- Abtei Maria-Frieden (abbey) in Kirchschletten
- Oberleiterbach with its lovely timber-frame houses won the gold medal in 1977 in the contest Unser Dorf soll schöner werden (“Our village ought to become lovelier”)
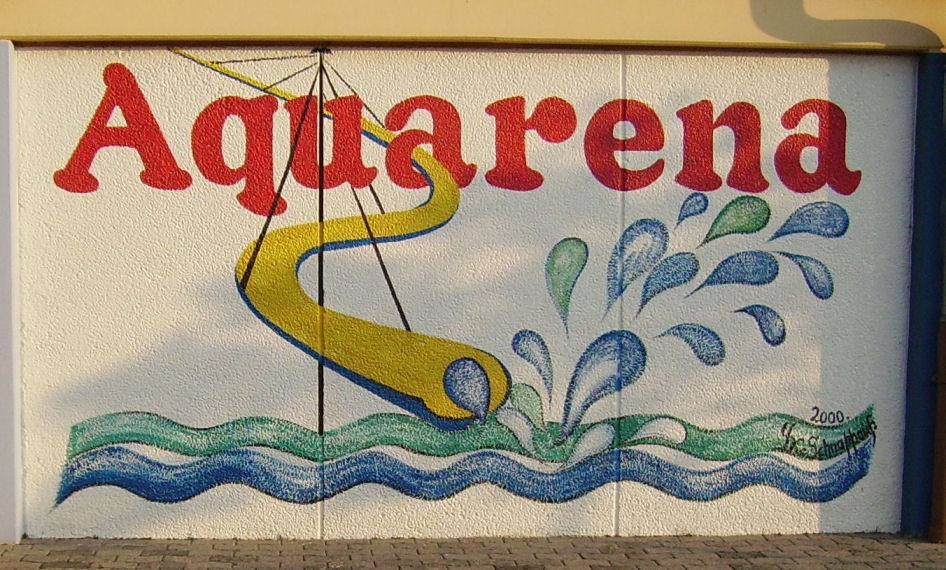
Aquarena swimming pool’s logo

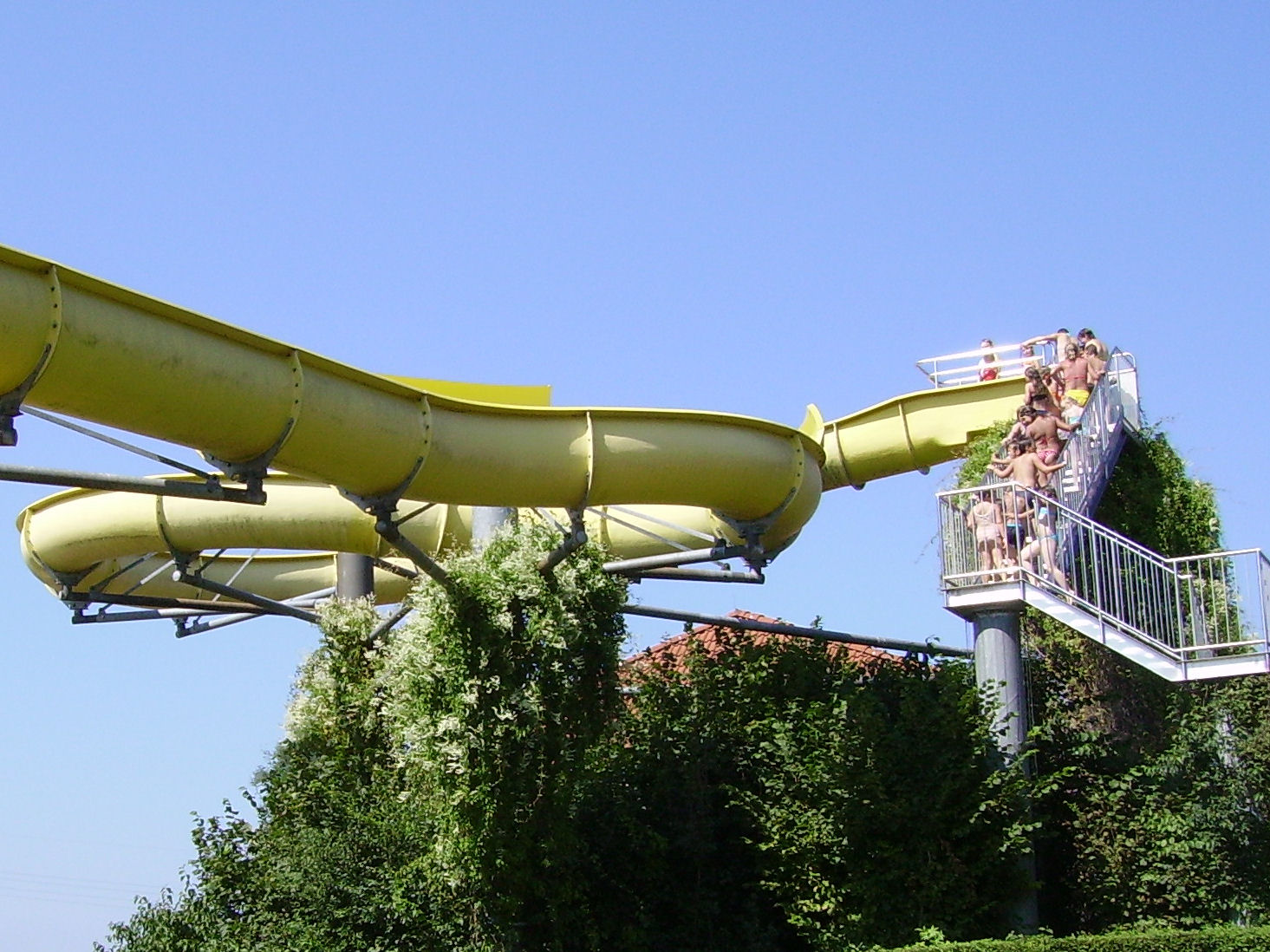
Slide

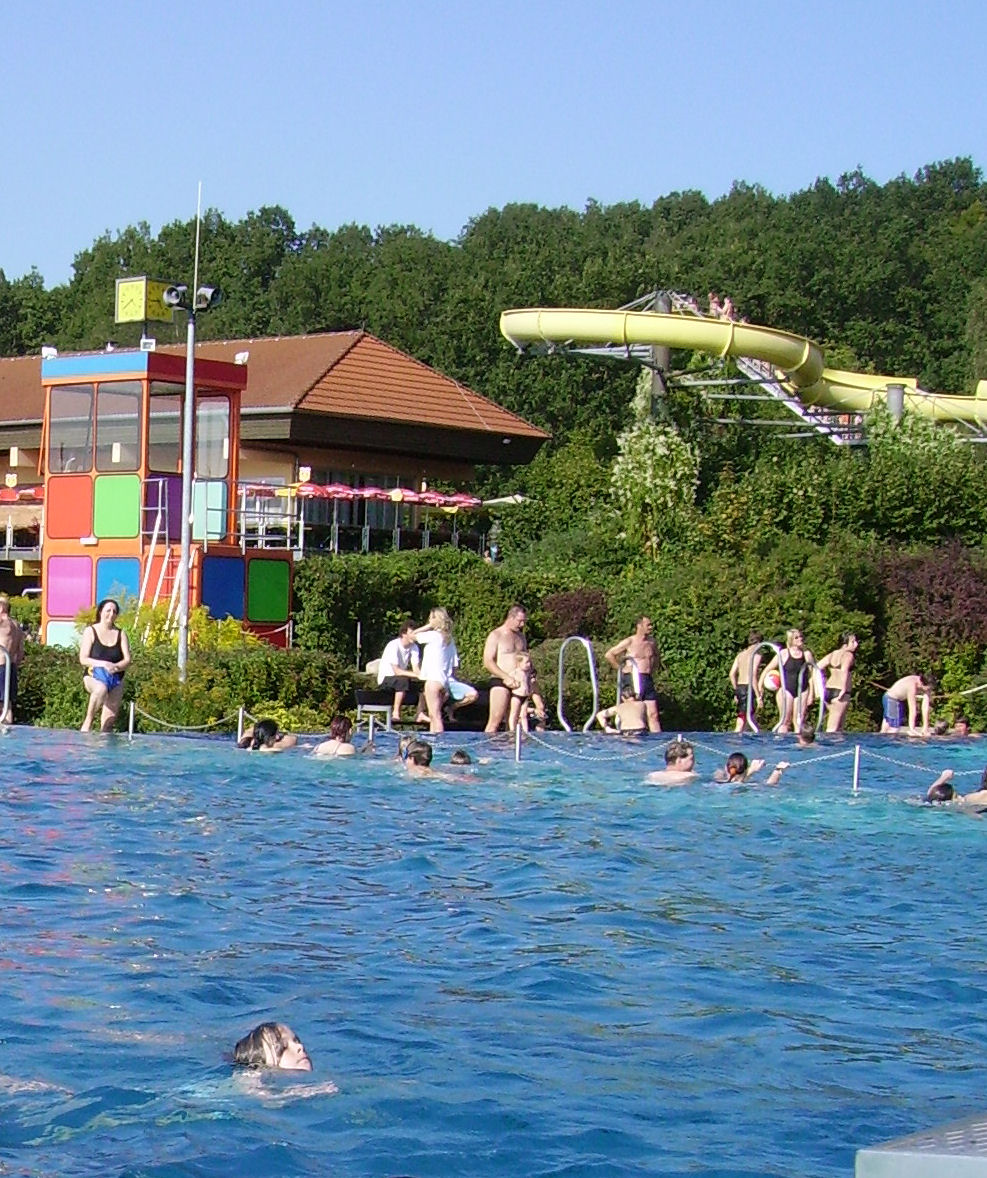
Basin
