= Rattelsdorf =

- Municipality
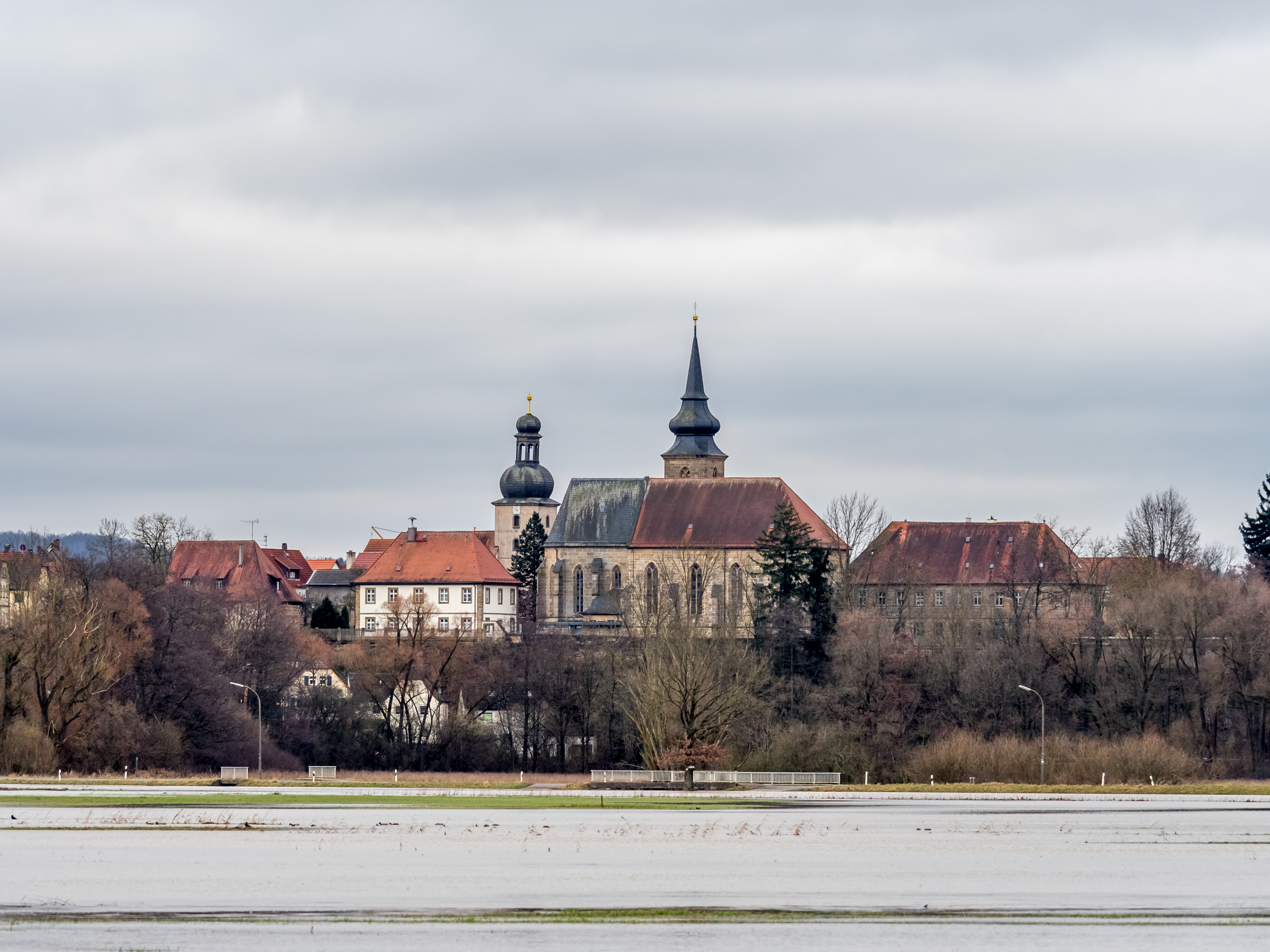
- View towards Rattelsdorf

- Coat of arms

- Location of Rattelsdorf within Bamberg district
- Interactive map of Rattelsdorf
- Location within Germany Location within Bavaria
- Coordinates: 50°0′56″N 10°53′13″E
- Country: Germany
- State: Bavaria
- Admin. region: Oberfranken
- District: Bamberg
- Subdivisions: 13 Ortsteile

Government
  - Mayor (2023–29): Hans-Jürgen Scheerbaum (CSU)

Area
  - Total: 39.58 km^{2} (15.28 sq mi)
- Elevation: 259 m (850 ft)

Population (2025-12-31)
  - Total: 4,494
  - Density: 113.5/km^{2} (294.1/sq mi)
- Time zone: UTC+01:00 (CET)
  - Summer (DST): UTC+02:00 (CEST)
- Postal codes: 96179
- Dialling codes: 09547
- Vehicle registration: BA
- Website: www.markt-rattelsdorf.de

Rattelsdorf (German pronunciation: [ˈʁatl̩sˌdɔʁf]) is a municipality with market rights in the Upper Franconian district of Bamberg.

== Geography ==
Rattelsdorf lies in the Upper Franconia-West region. It consists of 13 smaller population centres which are all found within the same area. Among them, Ebing is the second-biggest. What follows is a list of all centres with population figures:

- Busendorf bei Rattelsdorf 107
- Ebing 1,284
- Freudeneck 47
- Helfenroth 14
- Hilkersdorf 57
- Höfen 150
- Höfenneusig 35
- Medlitz 176
- Mürsbach 492
- Poppendorf 59
- Rattelsdorf 2,102
- Speiersberg 45
- Zaugendorf 50

as of May 2005

The municipality also has 7 traditional rural land units, known in German as Gemarkungen, named Busendorf, Ebing, Höfen b. Rattelsdorf, Medlitz, Mürsbach, Rattelsdorf and Daschendorfer Forst, six of which have the same names as six of the constituent municipalities (it is traditional for a Gemarkung to be named after a town or village lying nearby).

== History ==
Until Secularization in 1803, The Benedictine Monastery at Michelsberg held sway over Rattelsdorf. Michelsberg was one of the monasteries incorporated into the High Monastery at Bamberg. Since the Reichsdeputationshauptschluss of 1803, the municipality has belonged to Bavaria. In the course of administrative reform in Bavaria, today’s municipality came into being under the Gemeindeedikt (“municipality Edict”) of 1818. Until 1972, Rattelsdorf belonged to Staffelstein district. The constituent municipality of Höfen, with Höfenneusig and Freudeneck, as well as Mürsbach, with Zaugendorf and Helfenroth, belonged to Ebern district until 1972, and thereby to Lower Franconia.

=== Population development ===
Within municipal limits, 3,413 inhabitants were counted in 1970, 3,987 in 1987 and 4,566 in 2000. In May 2005, 4,681 inhabitants were counted.

=== Infrastructure ===
All together, Rattelsdorf has four breweries: the Schwanenbräu in Ebing, the Brauerei Endres in Höfen, the Sonnenbräu in Mürsbach and the Brauerei Fischer in Freudeneck (the smallest place in Bamberg district that has a brewery). In all three brewery inns, one can enjoy Franconian beer and bread specialities.

Also, in Medlitz there was the Brauerei Schwarzer Adler until 1986 and until 2002, Mürsbach also had the Brauerei Feiler.

== Politics ==
The mayor is Bruno Kellner (Vereinigtes Umland). The municipality council is made up of 16 members, shown here according to party affiliation:

- Ebinger Liste 4 seats
- CSU 4 seats
- SPD 3 seats
- Christliche-Wähler-Union 2 seats
- Vereinigtes Umland 2 seats
- Christlich-Bürgerliche-Wählergruppe 1 seat

In 1999, municipal tax revenue, converted to euros, amounted to €1,642,000 of which business taxes (net) amounted to €195,000.

=== Coat of arms ===
Rattelsdorf's coat of arms might heraldically be described thus: Argent on ground vert a church gules with roof and cupola azure, the latter surmounted by a Latin cross Or, before the church a pine tree vert, above the church and sinister, an arm clad sable, the hand holding a Latin cross sable.

== Economy and infrastructure ==
According to official statistics, there were 318 workers on the social welfare contribution rolls working in producing businesses, and in trade and transport none. In other areas, 1,673 workers on the social welfare contribution rolls worked from home. In processing businesses there was one business, and in construction there were seven. Furthermore, in 1999, there were 108 agricultural operations with a working area of 1 729 ha, of which 1 294 ha was cropland and 434 ha was meadowland.

=== Transport ===
Through the municipal area runs Bundesstraße 4. Being discussed at one time was a local airport to be built on a district plain north of Rattelsdorf. Plans were, however, dropped owing to citizens’ protests.

=== Education ===
In 1999 the following institutions existed in Rattelsdorf:

- Kindergartens: 175 places with 153 children
- Elementary schools: 1 with 17 teachers and 367 pupils
