= 1950 Kulmbach by-election =

Election in West Germany

- 14 May 1950

Constituency of Kulmbach
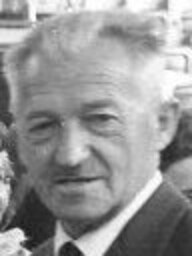
	First party	Second party	Third party
	CSU		WAV
Candidate	Johannes Semler	Wenzel Jaksch	Alfred Loritz
Party	CSU	SPD	WAV
Alliance	BP | FDP
Percentage	38.7%	37.1%	21.8%
Swing	▲19.1%	▲9.5%	▲1.1%
MP before election
Friedrich Schönauer
SPD
Elected MP
Johannes Semler
CSU

The Kulmbach by-election on May 14, 1950 was the first by-election for the Bundestag (Germany) that had been established 1949. It was caused by the death of Friedrich Schönauer (SPD) April 4, 1950 who had been elected at the 1949 German federal election

Despite an increased result of the SPD, they lost the seat to Johannes Semler (CSU), who was supported by BP and FDP.

This by-election showed a strange effect in the German AMS electoral system of the first election. The SPD in Bavaria had won this seat in the first past the post constituency, but all seats are justified through proportional representation. By winning the Kulmbach seat at the by-election the CSU had technically greater representation than their 1949 results would have proportionally given them. This was changed in January 1953 so only a by-election takes place if the election was not held or if a candidate dies before the general election.

== Result ==
Party	Share
CSU	38.7%
SPD	37.1%
WAV	21.8%
KPD	2.4%

== German Parliament Election result, 1949 ==
Party	Share
SPD	27.6%
WAV	20.7%
CSU	19.6%
BP	17.0%
FDP	11.7%
KPD	3.4%
