= Reckendorf =

- Municipality
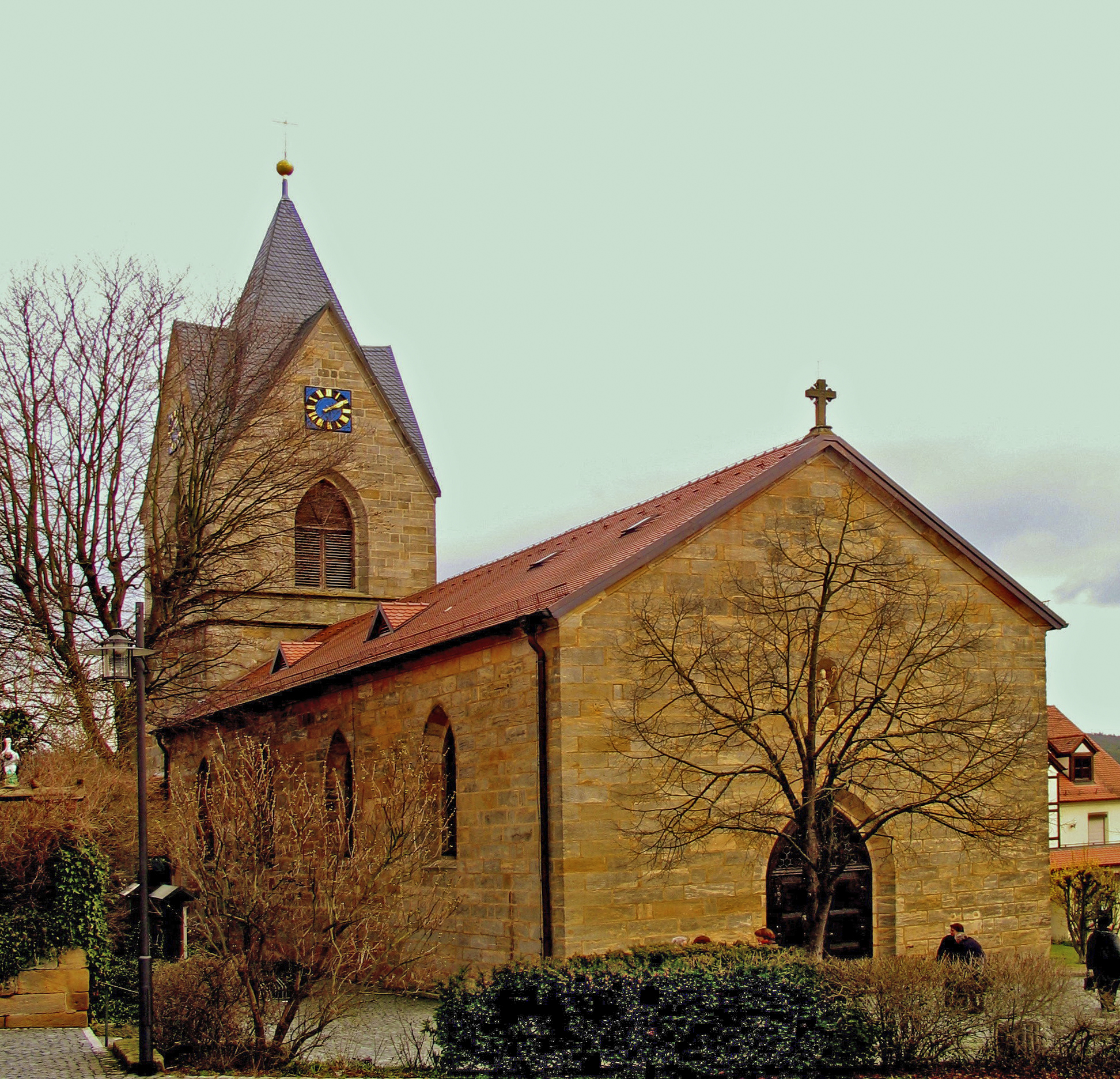
- Church of Saint Nicholas

- Coat of arms

- Location of Reckendorf within Bamberg district
- Interactive map of Reckendorf
- Location within Germany Location within Bavaria
- Coordinates: 50°1′8″N 10°49′50″E
- Country: Germany
- State: Bavaria
- Admin. region: Oberfranken
- District: Bamberg
- Municipal assoc.: Baunach

Government
  - Mayor (2020–26): Manfred Deinlein (SPD)

Area
  - Total: 13.06 km^{2} (5.04 sq mi)
- Elevation: 254 m (833 ft)

Population (2025-12-31)
  - Total: 1,932
  - Density: 147.9/km^{2} (383.1/sq mi)
- Time zone: UTC+01:00 (CET)
  - Summer (DST): UTC+02:00 (CEST)
- Postal codes: 96182
- Dialling codes: 09544
- Vehicle registration: BA

Reckendorf (East Franconian: Reggndäf) is a municipality in the district of Bamberg, in Upper Franconia, Bavaria, Germany. As of 2023, the population was 1,990. Reckendorf is a member of the administrative community (Verwaltungsgemeinschaft) of Baunach.

== History ==
The community came into being administratively under the Gemeindeedikt ("Community Edict") of 1818.

== Population ==
Within municipal limits, 1,526 inhabitants were counted in 1970, 1,546 in 1987 and 1,800 in 2000. Currently it is 2,036.

== Politics ==
Manfred Deinlein (SPD), was elected mayor in 2014 and re-elected in 2020.

== Notable people ==
Isaias Wolf Hellman born in Reckendorf on 3 October 1842, Jewish-American financier and philanthropist, a founder of the University of Southern California; with Henry E. Huntington formed the Los Angeles Railway in 1898 and the Pacific Electric Railway in 1901.
