= Bamberg (district) =

Coordinates: 49°50′N 10°50′E

- District
- Flag Coat of arms
- Country: Germany
- State: Bavaria
- Adm. region: Upper Franconia
- Capital: Bamberg

Government
  - District admin.: Johann Kalb (CSU)

Area
  - Total: 1,168 km^{2} (451 sq mi)

Population (31 December 2025)
  - Total: 147,319
  - Density: 126.1/km^{2} (326.7/sq mi)
- Time zone: UTC+01:00 (CET)
  - Summer (DST): UTC+02:00 (CEST)
- Vehicle registration: BA
- Website: landkreis-bamberg.de

Bamberg (German pronunciation: [ˈbambɛʁk]) is a Landkreis (district) in Bavaria, Germany. It surrounds but does not include the town of Bamberg. The district is bounded by the districts of (from the north and clockwise) Lichtenfels, Bayreuth, Forchheim, Erlangen-Höchstadt, Neustadt (Aisch)-Bad Windsheim, Kitzingen, Schweinfurt and Haßberge.

== History ==
The history of the district is linked with the history of Bamberg.

In 1862 the districts of Bamberg-West and Bamberg-East were established. They were merged in 1929. The present borders were established in 1972, when portions of the adjoining district of Erlangen-Höchstadt were annexed.

== Geography ==
The district surrounds the town of Bamberg. The western half of the district is occupied by the Steigerwald, a hilly forest region. In the east there is the hill chain of the Franconian Jura. Between these regions the Main river enters the district from the north, turns around just before the town of Bamberg and leaves to the northwest. The smaller Regnitz river comes from the south and flows into the Main at Bamberg.

== Coat of arms ==
The coat of arms displays the heraldic animals of Bamberg and Ebrach, a lion and a boar.

== Sights ==
| Fränkische Straße der Skulpturen | Litzendorf |
| Gügel | Scheßlitz |
| Giechburg | Scheßlitz |
| Kloster Ebrach | Ebrach |
| Schloss Greifenstein | Heiligenstadt |
| Sängerehrenmal Melkendorf | Litzendorf |
| St. Wenzeslaus | Litzendorf |
| Schloss Seehof | Memmelsdorf |
| Schloss Weißenstein | Pommersfelden |
| St.-Veit- und St.-Michaels-Kirche | Heiligenstadt |

== Towns and municipalities ==
Clickable map of towns and municipalities in the district

(populations as of 2007)

=== Towns ===
| Baunach | 3,909 inhabitants | 30.9 km^{2} |
| Hallstadt | 8,559 inhabitants | 14.5 km^{2} |
| Scheßlitz | 7,160 inhabitants | 94.9 km^{2} |
| Schlüsselfeld | 5,753 inhabitants | 70.2 km^{2} |

=== Market Towns ===
| Burgebrach | 6,466 inhabitants | 87.9 km^{2} |
| Burgwindheim | 1,431 inhabitants | 37.4 km^{2} |
| Buttenheim | 3,320 inhabitants | 30 km^{2} |
| Ebrach | 1,845 inhabitants | 29.6 km^{2} |
| Heiligenstadt | 3,642 inhabitants | 76.7 km^{2} |
| Hirschaid | 11,666 inhabitants | 41 km^{2} |
| Rattelsdorf | 4,531 inhabitants | 39.6 km^{2} |
| Zapfendorf | 5,042 inhabitants | 30.6 km^{2} |

=== Municipalities ===
| Altendorf | 1,941 inhabitants | 8.6 km^{2} |
| Bischberg | 6,037 inhabitants | 17.5 km^{2} |
| Breitengüßbach | 4,614 inhabitants | 16.9 km^{2} |
| Frensdorf | 4,887 inhabitants | 44 km^{2} |
| Gerach | 1,005 inhabitants | 7.8 km^{2} |
| Gundelsheim | 3,298 inhabitants | 3.8 km^{2} |
| Kemmern | 2,554 inhabitants | 8.3 km^{2} |
| Königsfeld | 1,352 inhabitants | 42.7 km^{2} |
| Lauter | 1,150 inhabitants | 12.8 km^{2} |
| Lisberg | 1,753 inhabitants | 8.4 km^{2} |
| Litzendorf | 6,045 inhabitants | 25.9 km^{2} |
| Memmelsdorf | 8,997 inhabitants | 26.2 km^{2} |
| Oberhaid | 4,668 inhabitants | 27.2 km^{2} |
| Pettstadt | 1,917 inhabitants | 9.9 km^{2} |
| Pommersfelden | 2,937 inhabitants | 35.7 km^{2} |
| Priesendorf | 1,534 inhabitants | 8.4 km^{2} |
| Reckendorf | 2,043 inhabitants | 13.1 km^{2} |
| Schönbrunn im Steigerwald | 1,935 inhabitants | 24.7 km^{2} |
| Stadelhofen | 1,261 inhabitants | 41 km^{2} |
| Stegaurach | 6,947 inhabitants | 23.9 km^{2} |
| Strullendorf | 7,805 inhabitants | 31.7 km^{2} |
| Viereth-Trunstadt | 3,645 inhabitants | 15.8 km^{2} |
| Walsdorf | 2,600 inhabitants | 16.2 km^{2} |
| Wattendorf | 700 inhabitants | 22.2 km^{2} |

=== Verwaltungsgemeinschaften (Collective Municipalities) ===
| Verwaltungsgemeinschaft Baunach | Baunach, Gerach, Lauter and Reckendorf |
| Verwaltungsgemeinschaft Burgebrach | Burgebrach and Schönbrunn |
| Verwaltungsgemeinschaft Ebrach | Burgwindheim and Ebrach |
| Verwaltungsgemeinschaft Lisberg | Lisberg and Priesendorf |
| Verwaltungsgemeinschaft Steinfeld | Königsfeld, Stadelhofen and Wattendorf |
