= Lauter, Bavaria =

Lauter
- Municipality
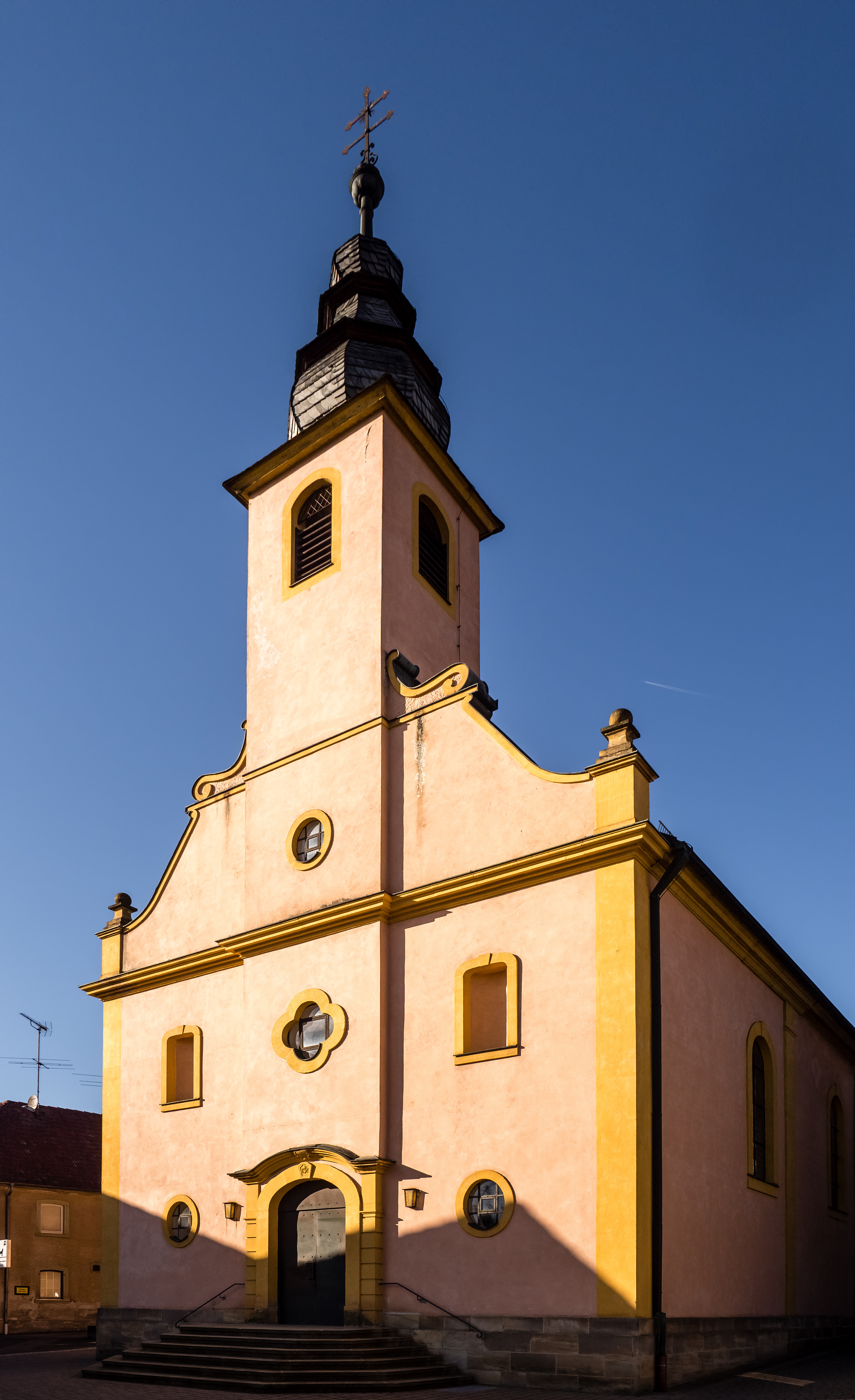
- Church of Saint Lawrence

- Coat of arms

- Location of Lauter within Bamberg district
- Interactive map of Lauter
- Location within Germany Location within Bavaria
- Coordinates: 49°58′N 10°47′E
- Country: Germany
- State: Bavaria
- Admin. region: Oberfranken
- District: Bamberg
- Municipal assoc.: Baunach

Government
  - Mayor (2020–26): Ronny Beck (CSU)

Area
  - Total: 12.4 km^{2} (4.8 sq mi)
- Elevation: 269 m (883 ft)

Population (2025-12-31)
  - Total: 1,195
  - Density: 96.4/km^{2} (250/sq mi)
- Time zone: UTC+01:00 (CET)
  - Summer (DST): UTC+02:00 (CEST)
- Postal codes: 96169
- Dialling codes: 09544
- Vehicle registration: BA
- Website: Official website

Lauter (German: [ˈlaʊtɐ]) is a municipality in the Upper Franconian district of Bamberg and a member of the administrative community (Verwaltungsgemeinschaft) of Baunach.

== Geography ==
The community lies in the Upper Franconia-West region on the Bach Lauter (brook), which runs into the river Baunach.

=== Constituent communities ===
The community is made up of the centres of Lauter with 601 inhabitants, Deusdorf with 277, Appendorf with 213, Leppelsdorf with 85, Krappenhof with 8 and Deusdorfer Mühle with 7. (as of 2004/2005)

The community also has 4 traditional rural land units, known in German as Gemarkungen, named Deusdorf, Lauter, Leppelsdorf and Appendorf, the same names as 4 of the constituent communities (it is traditional for a Gemarkung to be named after a town or village lying nearby).

== History ==
Pope Innocent IV stated in 1251 in a document the goods and privileges of the Michelsberg Monastery in Lauter. Lauter belonged to the High Monastery at Bamberg. The Counts of Truhendingen had their seat at the Stiefenburg (castle) near Lauter. Since the Reichsdeputationshauptschluss of 1803, the community has belonged to Bavaria. In the course of administrative reform in Bavaria, today's community came into being under the Gemeindeedikt (“Community Edict”) of 1818.

=== Population development ===
Within municipal limits, 1,000 inhabitants were counted in 1970, 1,024 in 1987 and 1,124 in 2000, In 2004 and 2005 it was 1,191.

== Politics ==
The mayor is Ronny Beck, elected in March 2020.

The community council is made up of 12 members, listed here by party or voter community affiliation, and also with the number of seats that each holds:

- CSU 7
- Freie Wähler 5

In 1999, municipal tax revenue, converted to euros, amounted to €497,000 of which business taxes (net) amounted to €126,000.

=== Coat of arms ===
Lauter's arms might heraldically be described thus: Gules two wings argent emerging from each inwards a clothed arm argent, each of which holds the handle of a grill reversed Or.

== Economy and infrastructure ==
According to official statistics, there were no workers on the social welfare contribution rolls working in producing businesses in 1998, and in trade and transport also none, but 391 such workers worked from home. In processing businesses there were two businesses, and in construction 3. Furthermore, in 1999, there were 32 agricultural operations with a working area of 315 ha, of which 247 ha was cropland and 67 ha was meadowland.

== Education ==
In 1999, the following institutions existed in Lauter:

- 50 kindergarten places with 46 children

== Other meaning ==
Lauter is also a German word that means “louder” or “more loudly”.
