= Viereth-Trunstadt =

- Municipality
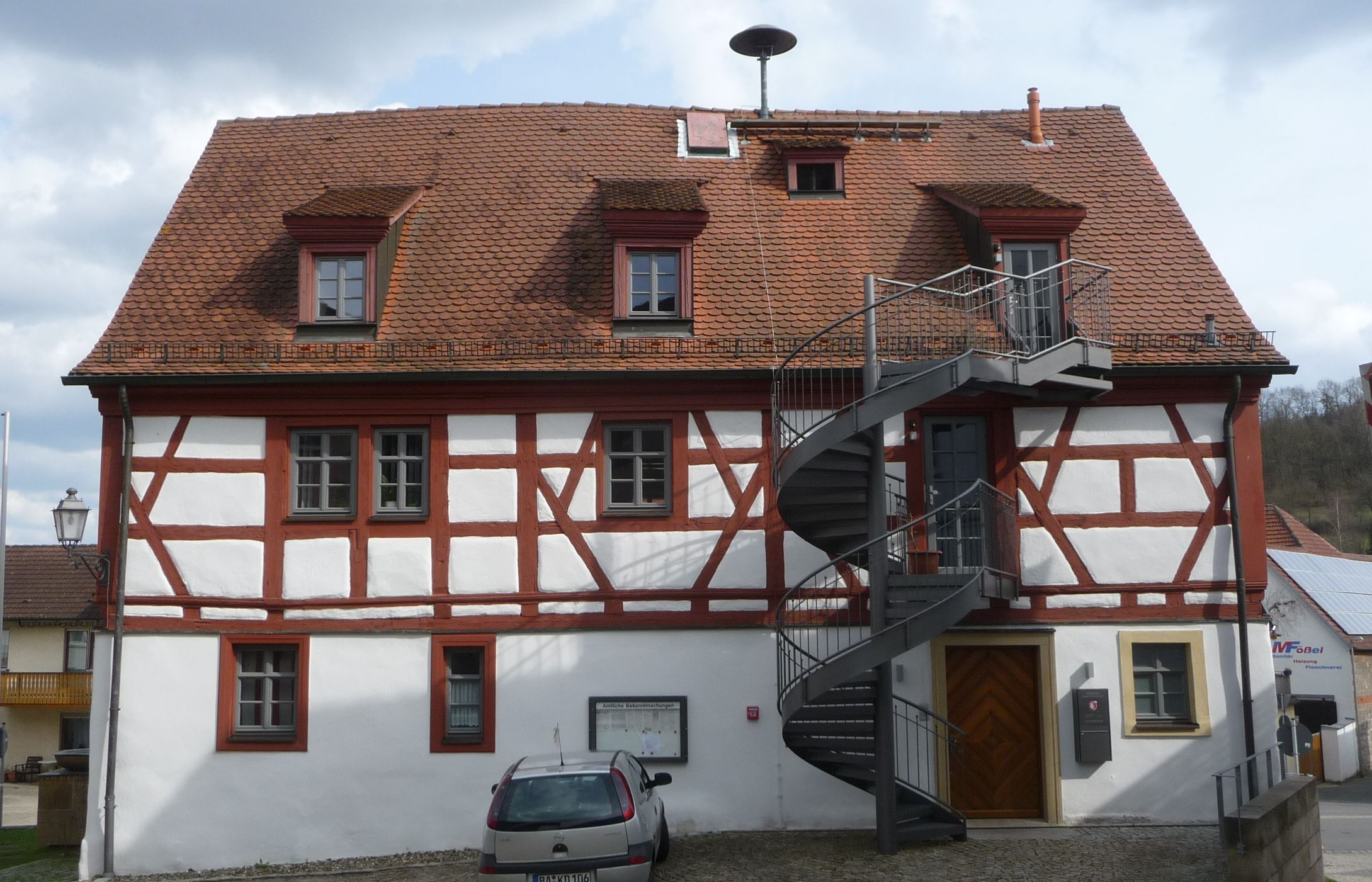
- Town hall

- Coat of arms

- Location of Viereth-Trunstadt within Bamberg district
- Interactive map of Viereth-Trunstadt
- Location within Germany Location within Bavaria
- Coordinates: 49°55′22″N 10°46′37″E
- Country: Germany
- State: Bavaria
- Admin. region: Oberfranken
- District: Bamberg
- Subdivisions: 4 Ortsteile

Government
  - Mayor (2020–26): Regina Wohlpart

Area
  - Total: 15.78 km^{2} (6.09 sq mi)
- Elevation: 249 m (817 ft)

Population (2025-12-31)
  - Total: 3,621
  - Density: 229.5/km^{2} (594.3/sq mi)
- Time zone: UTC+01:00 (CET)
  - Summer (DST): UTC+02:00 (CEST)
- Postal codes: 96191
- Dialling codes: 09503
- Vehicle registration: BA
- Website: www.viereth-trunstadt.de

Viereth-Trunstadt is a municipality in the Upper Franconian district of Bamberg lying on the Main in Germany.

== Geography ==
=== Constituent communities ===
==== Viereth ====
Viereth lies in the northeast outliers of the Steigerwald (forest) and right on the Main’s south bank. The community had its first documentary mention in 911 under the name Fihuriod, from the Old High German words corresponding with the Modern High German words Vieh (“livestock”) and Ried (“boggy brook”). This makes the Viehbach, a brook (Bach) running through the village, Viereth’s namesake. Until the Bishopric of Bamberg was founded, Viereth was part of the Volkfeldgau (a mediaeval Gau lying between Bamberg and the Main Triangle), and thereby also part of the Bishopric of Würzburg. in 1008, the part of the community lying east of the Viehbach passed to the Bishopric of Bamberg. The part to the west, where the church stood, remained along with Trunstadt with the Bishopric of Würzburg, as it had been all along. In 1803, in the course of Secularization and the Reichsdeputationshauptschluss, the Prince-Bishopric of Bamberg was dissolved as a sovereign state and annexed to the Kingdom of Bavaria. The Prince-Bishopric of Würzburg was likewise abolished in 1803, and here arose once again for a short time the sovereign Duchy of Franconia. Following in 1806 was the annexation of great parts of the former Prince-Bishopric of Würzburg by Bavaria. In 1807, as a result of a new administrative order, western Viereth and the parish of Trunstadt were assigned to the Archbishopric of Bamberg, meaning that the western Vierethers became the Bavarian Crown’s subjects only four years after their neighbours living east of the brook. Viereth has 1,806 inhabitants (as of 30 December 2004).

==== Trunstadt ====
Trunstadt lies in the north outliers of the Steigerwald on the Upper Main. It had its first documentary mention in 793 and is thereby the oldest place, as far as documentary evidence can confirm, in the district of Bamberg and on the Upper Main. Until 1978, Trunstadt was a community in its own right. Today, Trunstadt is home to 1,728 inhabitants (as of 30 December 2004).

==== Weiher ====
The small village of Weiher is named after a pond (Weiher in German). It had its first documentary mention in 1523 in a letter from Bishop of Bamberg Weygand. Weiher is home to 105 inhabitants (as of 30 December 2004).

==== Stückbrunn ====
The village of Stückbrunn had its first documentary mention in 1367 in a letter of enfeoffment. The name Stückbrunn came from earlier forms Stumbrunn and Stupprun. Stückbrunn is home to 142 inhabitants (as of 30 December 2004).

== History ==
Viereth belonged to the Michelsberg Monastery, which in turn belonged to the High Monastery at Bamberg. Since the Reichsdeputationshauptschluss of 1803, the community has belonged to Bavaria. Trunstadt belonged to the Counts Voit von Rieneck and only passed to Bavaria with the Act of the Confederation of the Rhine in 1806.

=== Population development ===
Within municipal limits, 2,262 inhabitants were counted in 1970, 2,838 in 1987 and 3,630 in 2000. In December 2004 the number had grown to 3,781. On 30 June 2007 it had fallen to 3,672.

== Politics ==
The mayor is Regina Wohlpart (Bürgergemeinschaft Viereth-Trunstadt), first elected in 2014 and re-elected in 2020.

The community council is made up of 16 members, listed here by party or voter community affiliation, and also with the number of seats that each holds:

- CSU-FWG: 5
- Überparteiliche Wählergemeinschaft: 4
- Bürgergemeinschaft Viereth-Trunstadt: 4
- UW Viereth-Trunstadt: 3

In 1999, municipal tax revenue, converted to euros, amounted to €1,486,000 of which business taxes (net) amounted to €265,000.

== Economy and infrastructure ==
According to official statistics, there were 6 workers on the social welfare contribution rolls working in agriculture or forestry in 1998, 309 in producing businesses, and in trade and transport 64. In other areas, 85 workers on the social welfare contribution rolls were employed, and 1,441 such workers worked from home. In processing businesses there were ten businesses, and in construction 7. Furthermore, in 1999, there were 60 agricultural operations with a working area of 736 ha, of which 537 ha was cropland and 194 ha was meadowland.

== Education ==
In 1999, the following institutions existed in Viereth-Trunstadt:

- 150 kindergarten places with 137 children
- Elementary school with 15 teachers and 241 pupils
