= Bamberg (electoral district) =

Federal electoral district of Germany

235 Bamberg
- Electoral district for the Bundestag
- Bamberg in 2025
- State: Bavaria
- Population: 241,100 (2019)
- Electorate: 179,277 (2025)
- Major settlements: Bamberg; Forchheim
- Area: 1,003.1 km^{2}

Current electoral district
- Created: 1949
- Party: CSU
- Member: Thomas Silberhorn
- Elected: 2002, 2005, 2009, 2013, 2017, 2021, 2025

Bamberg is an electoral constituency (German: Wahlkreis) represented in the Bundestag. It elects one member via first-past-the-post voting. Under the current constituency numbering system, it is designated as constituency 235. It is located in northern Bavaria, comprising the city of Bamberg, the southern part of the Landkreis Bamberg district, and the western part of the Forchheim district.

Bamberg was created for the inaugural 1949 federal election. Since 2002, it has been represented by Thomas Silberhorn of the Christian Social Union (CSU).

== Geography ==
Bamberg is located in northern Bavaria. As of the 2021 federal election, it comprises the independent city of Bamberg, the municipalities of Altendorf, Buttenheim, Frensdorf, Hallstadt, Hirschaid, Pettstadt, Pommersfelden, Schlüsselfeld, Stegaurach, Strullendorf, and Walsdorf and the Verwaltungsgemeinschaften of Burgebrach, Ebrach, and Lisberg from the Landkreis Bamberg district, and the municipalities of Eggolsheim, Forchheim, Hallerndorf, Hausen, Heroldsbach, Igensdorf, Langensendelbach, and Neunkirchen am Brand and the Verwaltungsgemeinschaften of Dormitz, Effeltrich, Gosberg, and Kirchehrenbach from the Forchheim district.

== History ==
Bamberg was created in 1949. In the 1949 election, it was Bavaria constituency 24 in the numbering system. In the 1953 through 1961 elections, it was number 219. In the 1965 through 1998 elections, it was number 222. In the 2002 and 2005 elections, it was number 237. In the 2009 through 2021 elections, it was number 236. From the 2025 election, it has been number 235.

Originally, the constituency comprised the independent city of Bamberg and the districts of Landkreis Bamberg and Staffelstein. In the 1965 through 1972 elections, it also contained the Höchstadt an der Aisch district. In the 1976 through 1998 elections, it comprised the city of Bamberg, southern parts of the Landkreis Bamberg district, and the Forchheim district. It acquired its current borders in the 2002 election.

Election	No.	Name	Borders
1949	24	Bamberg	Bamberg city; Landkreis Bamberg district; Staffelstein district
1953	219	Bamberg	Bamberg city; Landkreis Bamberg district; Staffelstein district
1957	219	Bamberg	Bamberg city; Landkreis Bamberg district; Staffelstein district
1961	219	Bamberg	Bamberg city; Landkreis Bamberg district; Staffelstein district
1965	222	Bamberg	Bamberg city; Landkreis Bamberg district; Staffelstein district; Höchstadt an der Aisch district
1969	222	Bamberg	Bamberg city; Landkreis Bamberg district; Staffelstein district; Höchstadt an der Aisch district
1972	222	Bamberg	Bamberg city; Landkreis Bamberg district; Staffelstein district; Höchstadt an der Aisch district
1976	222	Bamberg	Bamberg city; Landkreis Bamberg district (only southern parts); Forchheim district
1980	222	Bamberg	Bamberg city; Landkreis Bamberg district (only southern parts); Forchheim district
1983	222	Bamberg	Bamberg city; Landkreis Bamberg district (only southern parts); Forchheim district
1987	222	Bamberg	Bamberg city; Landkreis Bamberg district (only southern parts); Forchheim district
1990	222	Bamberg	Bamberg city; Landkreis Bamberg district (only southern parts); Forchheim district
1994	222	Bamberg	Bamberg city; Landkreis Bamberg district (only southern parts); Forchheim district
1998	222	Bamberg	Bamberg city; Landkreis Bamberg district (only southern parts); Forchheim district
2002	237	Bamberg	Bamberg city; Landkreis Bamberg district (only Altendorf, Buttenheim, Frensdorf, Hallstadt, Hirschaid, Pettstadt, Pommersfelden, Schlüsselfeld, Stegaurach, Strullendorf, and Walsdorf municipalities and Burgebrach, Ebrach, and Lisberg Verwaltungsgemeinschaften); Forchheim district (only Eggolsheim, Forchheim, Hallerndorf, Hausen, Heroldsbach, Igensdorf, Langensendelbach, and Neunkirchen am Brand municipalities and Dormitz, Effeltrich, Gosberg, and Kirchehrenbach Verwaltungsgemeinschaften)
2005	237	Bamberg	Bamberg city; Landkreis Bamberg district (only Altendorf, Buttenheim, Frensdorf, Hallstadt, Hirschaid, Pettstadt, Pommersfelden, Schlüsselfeld, Stegaurach, Strullendorf, and Walsdorf municipalities and Burgebrach, Ebrach, and Lisberg Verwaltungsgemeinschaften); Forchheim district (only Eggolsheim, Forchheim, Hallerndorf, Hausen, Heroldsbach, Igensdorf, Langensendelbach, and Neunkirchen am Brand municipalities and Dormitz, Effeltrich, Gosberg, and Kirchehrenbach Verwaltungsgemeinschaften)
2009	236	Bamberg	Bamberg city; Landkreis Bamberg district (only Altendorf, Buttenheim, Frensdorf, Hallstadt, Hirschaid, Pettstadt, Pommersfelden, Schlüsselfeld, Stegaurach, Strullendorf, and Walsdorf municipalities and Burgebrach, Ebrach, and Lisberg Verwaltungsgemeinschaften); Forchheim district (only Eggolsheim, Forchheim, Hallerndorf, Hausen, Heroldsbach, Igensdorf, Langensendelbach, and Neunkirchen am Brand municipalities and Dormitz, Effeltrich, Gosberg, and Kirchehrenbach Verwaltungsgemeinschaften)
2013	236	Bamberg	Bamberg city; Landkreis Bamberg district (only Altendorf, Buttenheim, Frensdorf, Hallstadt, Hirschaid, Pettstadt, Pommersfelden, Schlüsselfeld, Stegaurach, Strullendorf, and Walsdorf municipalities and Burgebrach, Ebrach, and Lisberg Verwaltungsgemeinschaften); Forchheim district (only Eggolsheim, Forchheim, Hallerndorf, Hausen, Heroldsbach, Igensdorf, Langensendelbach, and Neunkirchen am Brand municipalities and Dormitz, Effeltrich, Gosberg, and Kirchehrenbach Verwaltungsgemeinschaften)
2017	236	Bamberg	Bamberg city; Landkreis Bamberg district (only Altendorf, Buttenheim, Frensdorf, Hallstadt, Hirschaid, Pettstadt, Pommersfelden, Schlüsselfeld, Stegaurach, Strullendorf, and Walsdorf municipalities and Burgebrach, Ebrach, and Lisberg Verwaltungsgemeinschaften); Forchheim district (only Eggolsheim, Forchheim, Hallerndorf, Hausen, Heroldsbach, Igensdorf, Langensendelbach, and Neunkirchen am Brand municipalities and Dormitz, Effeltrich, Gosberg, and Kirchehrenbach Verwaltungsgemeinschaften)
2021	236	Bamberg	Bamberg city; Landkreis Bamberg district (only Altendorf, Buttenheim, Frensdorf, Hallstadt, Hirschaid, Pettstadt, Pommersfelden, Schlüsselfeld, Stegaurach, Strullendorf, and Walsdorf municipalities and Burgebrach, Ebrach, and Lisberg Verwaltungsgemeinschaften); Forchheim district (only Eggolsheim, Forchheim, Hallerndorf, Hausen, Heroldsbach, Igensdorf, Langensendelbach, and Neunkirchen am Brand municipalities and Dormitz, Effeltrich, Gosberg, and Kirchehrenbach Verwaltungsgemeinschaften)
2025	235	Bamberg	Bamberg city; Landkreis Bamberg district (only Altendorf, Buttenheim, Frensdorf, Hallstadt, Hirschaid, Pettstadt, Pommersfelden, Schlüsselfeld, Stegaurach, Strullendorf, and Walsdorf municipalities and Burgebrach, Ebrach, and Lisberg Verwaltungsgemeinschaften); Forchheim district (only Eggolsheim, Forchheim, Hallerndorf, Hausen, Heroldsbach, Igensdorf, Langensendelbach, and Neunkirchen am Brand municipalities and Dormitz, Effeltrich, Gosberg, and Kirchehrenbach Verwaltungsgemeinschaften)

== Members ==
Like most constituencies in rural Bavaria, it is an CSU safe seat, the party holding the seat continuously since its creation. It was first represented by Emil Kemmer from 1949 to 1965, followed by Paul Röhner from 1965 to 1983. Gerhard Scheu was then representative from 1983 to 2002. Thomas Silberhorn was elected in 2002 and re-elected in 2005, 2009, 2013, 2017, 2021, and 2025.

Election	Member	Party	%
1949	Emil Kemmer	CSU	33.0
1953	Emil Kemmer	CSU	54.4
1957	Emil Kemmer	CSU	63.1
1961	Emil Kemmer	CSU	62.7
1965	Paul Röhner	CSU	63.0
1969	Paul Röhner	CSU	64.5
1972	Paul Röhner	CSU	65.2
1976	Paul Röhner	CSU	68.4
1980	Paul Röhner	CSU	66.7
1983	Gerhard Scheu	CSU	67.3
1987	Gerhard Scheu	CSU	64.0
1990	Gerhard Scheu	CSU	59.3
1994	Gerhard Scheu	CSU	56.8
1998	Gerhard Scheu	CSU	54.6
2002	Thomas Silberhorn	CSU	60.7
2005	Thomas Silberhorn	CSU	57.4
2009	Thomas Silberhorn	CSU	49.1
2013	Thomas Silberhorn	CSU	52.2
2017	Thomas Silberhorn	CSU	42.1
2021	Thomas Silberhorn	CSU	37.0
2025	Thomas Silberhorn	CSU	39.4

== Election results ==
=== 2025 election ===
Federal election (2025): Bamberg
Notes:	Blue background denotes the winner of the electorate vote. Pink background denotes a candidate elected from their party list. Yellow background denotes an electorate win by a list member, or other incumbent. A ✓ or ✗ denotes status of any incumbent, win or lose respectively.						
Party	Candidate	Votes	%	±%	Party votes	%	±%
CSU	✓ Thomas Silberhorn	61,044	39.4	▲2.4	57,363	37.0	▲3.6
AfD	Michael Adam Weiß	28,887	18.7	▲9.7	29,977	19.3	▲9.7
SPD	Andreas Schwarz	22,569	14.6	▼4.5	17,554	11.3	▼6.0
Greens	Lisa Hildegard Badum	20,762	13.4	▼2.0	19,474	12.6	▼2.2
Left	Jan Jaegers	7,914	5.1	▲2.7	10,111	6.5	▲3.4
FW	Jens Herzog	6,174	4.0	▼1.9	5,462	3.5	▼2.7
FDP	Sebastian Körber	4,709	3.0	▼3.6	6,059	3.9	▼5.8
BSW					4,566	2.9	
Volt	Tim Reising	1,789	1.2	▲0.7	1,307	0.8	▲0.5
APT					1,166	0.8	▼0.3
PARTEI					560	0.4	▼0.4
dieBasis					500	0.3	▼1.1
ÖDP	Lisa Lösel	1,009	0.7	▼0.2	459	0.3	▼0.2
BP					173	0.1	▼0.1
Humanists					121	0.1	Steady
BD					117	0.1	
MLPD					49	0.0	Steady
Informal votes		671			474		
Total valid votes		154,857			155,054		
Turnout		155,528	86.8	▲5.3			
CSU hold	Majority	32,157	20.7	▲2.7			

=== 2021 election ===
Federal election (2021): Bamberg
Notes:	Blue background denotes the winner of the electorate vote. Pink background denotes a candidate elected from their party list. Yellow background denotes an electorate win by a list member, or other incumbent. A ✓ or ✗ denotes status of any incumbent, win or lose respectively.						
Party	Candidate	Votes	%	±%	Party votes	%	±%
CSU	✓ Thomas Silberhorn	54,726	37.0	▼5.1	49,463	33.4	▼5.5
SPD	Andreas Schwarz	28,123	19.0	▼1.4	25,698	17.4	▲1.8
Greens	Lisa Badum	22,728	15.4	▲6.2	21,898	14.8	▲4.9
AfD	Michael Weiß	13,279	9.0	▼2.5	14,284	9.6	▼3.1
FDP	Sven Bachmann	9,821	6.6	▲0.1	14,336	9.7	▲0.1
FW	Jens Herzog	8,708	5.9	▲3.0	9,184	6.2	▲3.8
Left	Jan Jaegers	3,625	2.5	▼2.8	4,676	3.2	▼3.3
dieBasis	Sabine Wezel	2,361	1.6		2,093	1.4	
Tierschutzpartei					1,499	1.0	▲0.1
PARTEI	Paul Mari	1,627	1.1		1,111	0.8	▼0.2
ÖDP	Lisa Lösel	1,287	0.9	▼0.5	742	0.5	▼0.2
Volt	Hans-Günter Brünker	726	0.5		575	0.4	
Pirates					514	0.3	0.0
BP	Thomas Dotzler	491	0.3	▼0.2	381	0.3	▼0.2
Team Todenhöfer					319	0.2	
Unabhängige					262	0.2	
Gesundheitsforschung					211	0.1	0.0
Humanists					173	0.1	
V-Partei3					149	0.1	▼0.1
NPD					127	0.1	▼0.3
The III. Path					108	0.1	
Bündnis C					105	0.1	
du.					70	0.0	
MLPD	Therese Gmelch	179	0.1	▼0.1	50	0.0	0.0
Independent	Andreas Roensch	114	0.1				
LKR					23	0.0	
DKP					17	0.0	0.0
Informal votes		865			592		
Total valid votes		147,795			148,068		
Turnout		148,660	81.4	▲1.9			
CSU hold	Majority	26,603	18.0	▼3.7			

=== 2017 election ===
Federal election (2017): Bamberg
Notes:	Blue background denotes the winner of the electorate vote. Pink background denotes a candidate elected from their party list. Yellow background denotes an electorate win by a list member, or other incumbent. A ✓ or ✗ denotes status of any incumbent, win or lose respectively.						
Party	Candidate	Votes	%	±%	Party votes	%	±%
CSU	✓ Thomas Silberhorn	60,675	42.1	▼10.1	56,138	38.9	▼10.0
SPD	Andreas Schwarz	29,475	20.4	▼2.4	22,529	15.6	▼4.2
AfD	Jan Schiffers	16,603	11.5	▲8.2	18,392	12.7	▼8.6
Greens	Lisa Badum	13,194	9.2	▲1.0	14,279	9.9	▲0.9
FDP	Sebastian Körber	9,364	6.5	▲3.1	13,776	9.5	▲4.7
Left	David Klanke	7,504	5.2	▲1.7	9,351	6.5	▲2.4
FW	Daniela Saiko	4,203	2.9	▲0.1	3,425	2.4	▼0.5
Tierschutzpartei					1,305	0.9	▲0.1
PARTEI					1,303	0.9	
ÖDP	Lucas Büchner	1,942	1.3		947	0.7	0.0
BP	Thomas Dotzler	821	0.6		622	0.4	0.0
NPD					566	0.4	▼0.9
Pirates					480	0.3	▼2.0
DM					285	0.2	
V-Partei³					246	0.2	
DiB					234	0.2	
BGE					204	0.1	
Gesundheitsforschung					188	0.1	
MLPD	Therese Gmelch	352	0.2		110	0.1	0.0
BüSo					25	0.0	0.0
DKP					16	0.0	
Informal votes		1,089			801		
Total valid votes		144,133			144,421		
Turnout		145,222	79.6	▲9.1			
CSU hold	Majority	31,200	21.7	▼7.6			

=== 2013 election ===
Federal election (2013): Bamberg
Notes:	Blue background denotes the winner of the electorate vote. Pink background denotes a candidate elected from their party list. Yellow background denotes an electorate win by a list member, or other incumbent. A ✓ or ✗ denotes status of any incumbent, win or lose respectively.						
Party	Candidate	Votes	%	±%	Party votes	%	±%
CSU	✓ Thomas Silberhorn	65,723	52.2	▲3.2	61,546	48.9	▲4.0
SPD	Andreas Schwarz	28,794	22.9	▲2.4	24,924	19.8	▲4.5
Greens	Wolfgang Grader	10,283	8.2	▼1.0	11,267	8.9	▼1.6
Left	Wolfgang Böhme	4,365	3.5	▼2.5	5,143	4.1	▼2.4
FDP	Sebastian Körber	4,252	3.4	▼7.3	6,073	4.8	▼8.9
AfD	Franz Hermann Eibl	4,222	3.4		5,211	4.1	
FW	Peter Korbinian Dorscht	3,549	2.8		3,559	2.8	
Pirates	Robert Streng	3,025	2.4		2,905	2.3	▼0.1
NPD	Sven Diem	1,661	1.3	▼0.2	1,619	1.3	▼0.1
Tierschutzpartei					964	0.8	▲0.1
ÖDP					792	0.6	0.0
REP					586	0.5	▼1.0
BP					570	0.5	▼0.1
DIE FRAUEN					319	0.3	
DIE VIOLETTEN					139	0.1	▼0.1
Party of Reason					131	0.1	
PRO					82	0.1	
MLPD					60	0.0	0.0
RRP					40	0.0	▼0.5
BüSo					19	0.0	▼0.1
Informal votes		995			920		
Total valid votes		125,874			125,949		
Turnout		126,869	70.5	▼2.3			
CSU hold	Majority	36,929	29.3	▲0.6			

=== 2009 election ===
Federal election (2009): Bamberg
Notes:	Blue background denotes the winner of the electorate vote. Pink background denotes a candidate elected from their party list. Yellow background denotes an electorate win by a list member, or other incumbent. A ✓ or ✗ denotes status of any incumbent, win or lose respectively.						
Party	Candidate	Votes	%	±%	Party votes	%	±%
CSU	✓ Thomas Silberhorn	62,548	49.1	▼8.3	57,433	44.9	▼5.6
SPD	Andreas Schwarz	26,044	20.4	▼3.4	19,553	15.3	▼8.5
FDP	Sebastian Körber	13,590	10.7	▲5.3	17,523	13.7	▲4.6
Greens	Lisa Badum	11,726	9.2	▼1.1	13,512	10.6	▲2.8
Left	Heinrich Schwimmbeck	7,601	6.0		8,316	6.5	▲3.0
Pirates					3,041	2.4	
REP	Joseph Lorenz	2,213	1.7		1,937	1.5	▼0.2
NPD	Axel Michaelis	1,899	1.5	▼1.7	1,759	1.4	▼0.3
FAMILIE					1,061	0.8	▲0.2
Tierschutzpartei					790	0.6	
BP	Thomas Dotzler	1,562	1.2		770	0.6	▲0.2
ÖDP					754	0.6	
RRP					714	0.6	
Independent	Monika Lamprecht	303	0.2				
DIE VIOLETTEN					244	0.2	
PBC					188	0.1	▼0.1
CM					138	0.1	
MLPD					58	0.0	0.0
DVU					55	0.0	
BüSo					33	0.0	0.0
Informal votes		1,563			1,170		
Total valid votes		127,486			127,879		
Turnout		129,049	72.8	▼5.5			
CSU hold	Majority	36,504	28.7	▼4.9			

=== 2005 election ===
Federal election (2005):Bamberg
Notes:	Blue background denotes the winner of the electorate vote. Pink background denotes a candidate elected from their party list. Yellow background denotes an electorate win by a list member, or other incumbent. A ✓ or ✗ denotes status of any incumbent, win or lose respectively.						
Party	Candidate	Votes	%	±%	Party votes	%	±%
CSU	✓ Thomas Silberhorn	76,536	57.4	▼3.3	67,980	50.5	▼10.4
SPD	Daniel Höltgen	31,777	23.8	▲0.3	32,012	23.8	▼0.1
Greens	Ursula Sowa	13,782	10.3	▲1.3	10,386	77.7	▲0.2
FDP	Gabriele Seidl	7,137	5.3	▲1.4	12,189	9.1	▲4.8
Left					4,702	3.5	▲2.8
NPD	Axel Michaelis	4,201	3.1		2,319	1.7	▲0.5
REP					2,262	1.7	▲0.6
Familie					889	0.7	
BP					505	0.4	▲0.3
GRAUEN					387	0.3	▲0.2
Feminist					368	0.3	▲0.2
PBC					329	0.2	▲0.1
MLPD					115	0.1	
BüSo					89	0.1	0.0
Informal votes		2,566			1,467		
Total valid votes		133,433			134,532		
Turnout		135,999	78.3	▼2.6			
CSU hold	Majority	44,759	33.6				
