= Zeegenbach =

River in Germany

Ziegenbach
- The Zeegenbach east of Leesten

- Mouth of the Zeegenbach

Location
- Country: Germany
- State: Bavaria
- District: Bamberg
- Reference no.: DE: 242952

Physical characteristics
- Source
  - location: east of the village Zeegendorf, in the karsts of the Franconian Switzerland
  - coordinates: 49°52′24″N 11°04′38″E
- Mouth
  - location: north of Pettstadt in the Regnitz
  - coordinates: 49.8416°N 10.9391°E
- Length: 13 km (8.1 mi)

Basin features
- Progression: Regnitz→ Main→ Rhine→ North Sea

The Zeegenbach is a stream in Franconia, Germany, in the Franconian Jura region, and is about 13 kilometres (8 mi) long. The Zeegenbach lies about 15 kilometres (9 mi) south-west from Bamberg by the town of Strullendorf.

== Name ==
In official maps, the Zeegenbach is sometimes also called the Ziegenbach. In other, non-official maps, the lower course of the stream is sometimes called the Strullendorfer Bach, or the "Strullendorf stream".

== Course ==
The Zeegenbach has its source east of the village Zeegendorf, in the karsts of the Franconian Switzerland. Through the "Zeegenbachtal" valley flows the stream of the same name in the direction of Strullendorf. Here a multitude of small sources feeds the stream. On its course lies the villages of Zeegendorf, Mistendorf, Leesten, Wernsdorf and Amlingstadt, all of which belong to the community of Strullendorf.

West from Strullendorf, the Zeegenbach crosses the Rhine–Main–Danube Canal. North of Pettstadt, the Zeegenbach flows into the Regnitz.

== See also ==
- List of rivers of Bavaria
