= Brauhaus am Kreuzberg =

German brewery

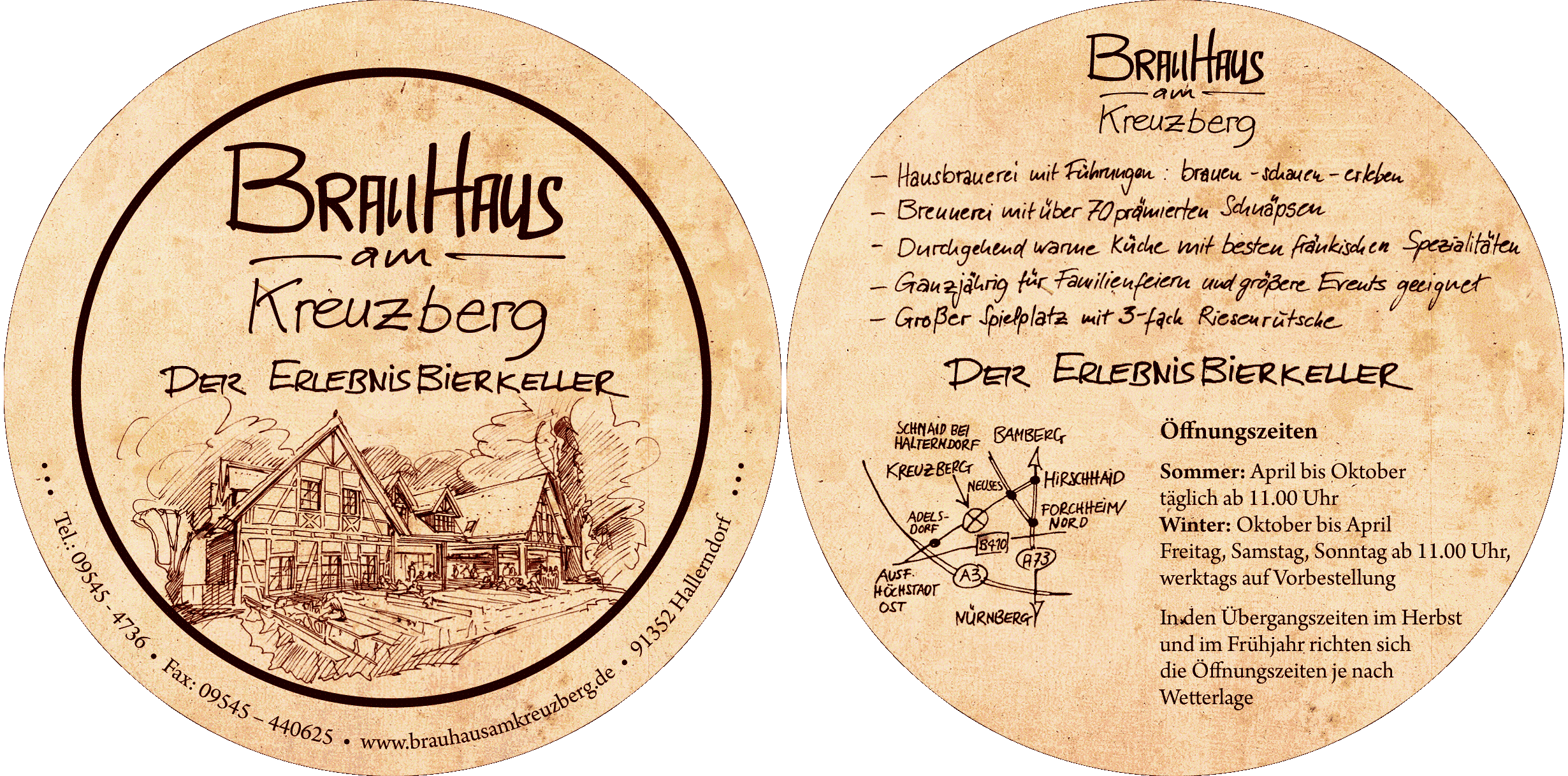
- Interactive map of Brauhaus am Kreuzberg
- Location: Kreuzberg 1, Hallerndorf-Schnaid, Upper Franconia, Bavaria, Germany
- Coordinates: 49°45′32″N 10°57′20″E
- Opened: 1461
- Key people: Winkelmann family
- Annual production volume: 10,000 hectolitres (8,500 US bbl)
- Website: www.brauhaus-am-kreuzberg.de

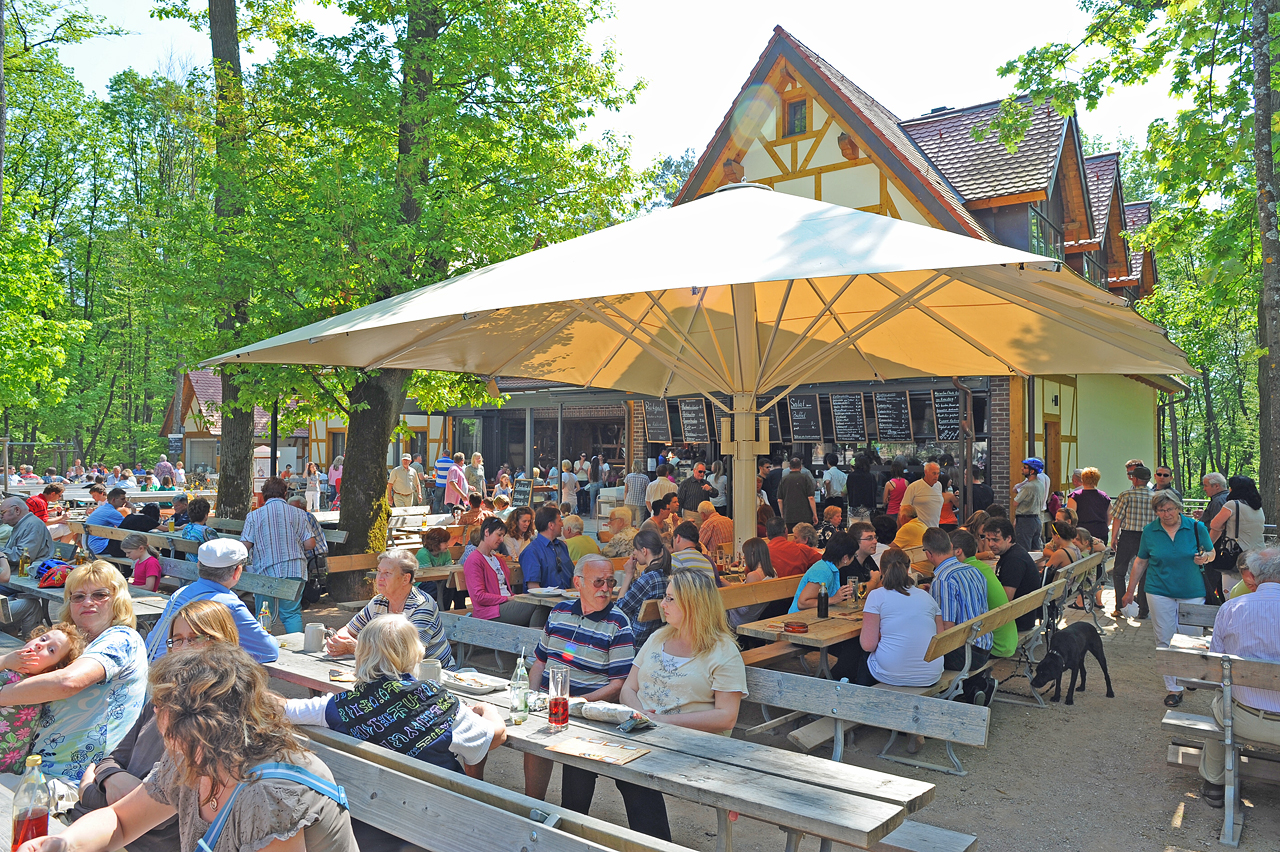
Brauhaus am Kreuzberg

Brauhaus am Kreuzberg is a brewery based in Kreuzberg, Hallerndorf, Germany founded in 1461. It operates Friedels Keller, an on-site beer cellar. Its products and services include beer, a brewery, a distillery and a beer cellar and restaurant.

In 1461 the family Friedel started brewing in Hallerndorfer district Schnaid.

Today the brewery produces various beers including Zwickelbier, wheat beer and pilsner, etc.

== See also ==
- List of oldest companies
