= Geisberg =

Geisberg is a name of several mountains in German, including:

- Geisberg (Middle Moselle)
- Geisberg (Geisberg Forest)

== See also ==
- Longer list of mountains named Geisberg on the German Wikipedia
- Château du Geisberg
- Battle of Geisberg (1793)
- Marek Geišberg
- Marián Geišberg
