= Geisfeld (Bavaria) =

Coordinates: 49°52′53″N 11°00′47″E

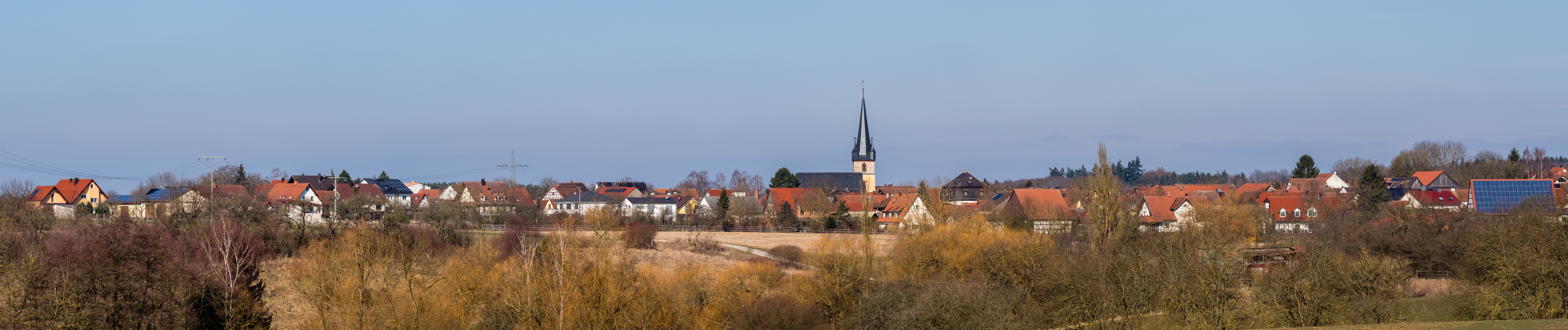
Panorama view of Geisfeld

Geisfeld is a small village located in Bavaria, Germany. It is in Upper Franconia, in the Bamberg district. Geisfeld is a constituent community of Strullendorf.

In 2009, Geisfeld had a total population of 911.

== Geography ==
To the north of the village is the community of Litzendorf, to the east is the village of Mistendorf, to the south are the villages of Roßdorf am Forst, Leesten and Wernsdorf, and to the west is the city of Bamberg.

Geisfeld lies south of the mountain Geisberg.

== Culture ==
There are two breweries in Geisfeld: "Brauerei Griess" and "Brauerei Krug."

There are also several community organizations in Geisfeld:

- Catholic Kindergarten: "Kath. Kindergarten St. Magdalena"
- Culture/Arts Club: "Kulturelle Dorfgemeinschaft Geisfeld e.V."
- Sports Club: "DJK-SV Geisfeld"
- Volunteer Fire Department: "Freiwillige Feuerwehr Geisfeld"

== Infrastructure ==
Geisfeld lies on the Staatsstraßen 2210 and 2276.
