= Gerhard Scheu =

German politician (1943–2025)

Member of the Bundestag; for Bamberg
- In office 29 March 1983 – 17 October 2002
- Preceded by: Ekkehard Voigt
- Succeeded by: Thomas Silberhorn

Personal details
- Born: 27 March 1943 Brandenburg an der Havel, Germany
- Died: 5 December 2025 (aged 82)
- Party: Christian Social Union
- Children: 1
- Occupation: Lawyer

Gerhard Scheu (27 March 1943 – 5 December 2025) was a German politician. A member of the Christian Social Union in Bavaria, he served in the Bundestag from 1983 to 2002.

Scheu died on 5 December 2025, at the age of 82.
