= Roßdorf am Forst =

Village in Bavaria, Germany

Coordinates: 49°51′58″N 10°59′46″E

Roßdorf am Forst is a small village located in Bavaria, Germany. It is in Upper Franconia, in the Bamberg district. Roßdorf am Forst is a constituent community of Strullendorf.

In 2009, Roßdorf am Forst had a total population of 510.

== Geography ==
The village is about 3 kilometers north-east from Strullendorf. It has an area of about 28 hectares.

It has an elevation of about 300 meters.

== History ==
Roßdorf am Forst was mentioned for the first time in the second half of the 12th century; it was at that time called "Ratestorf."

== Infrastructure ==
In Roßdorf am Forst there is a brewery and restaurant named the "Brauerei Sauer."

Around the town are the Staatsstraßen 2276, 2210 and 2188. In the west lies the Bundesautobahn 73.
