= Bräuningshof =

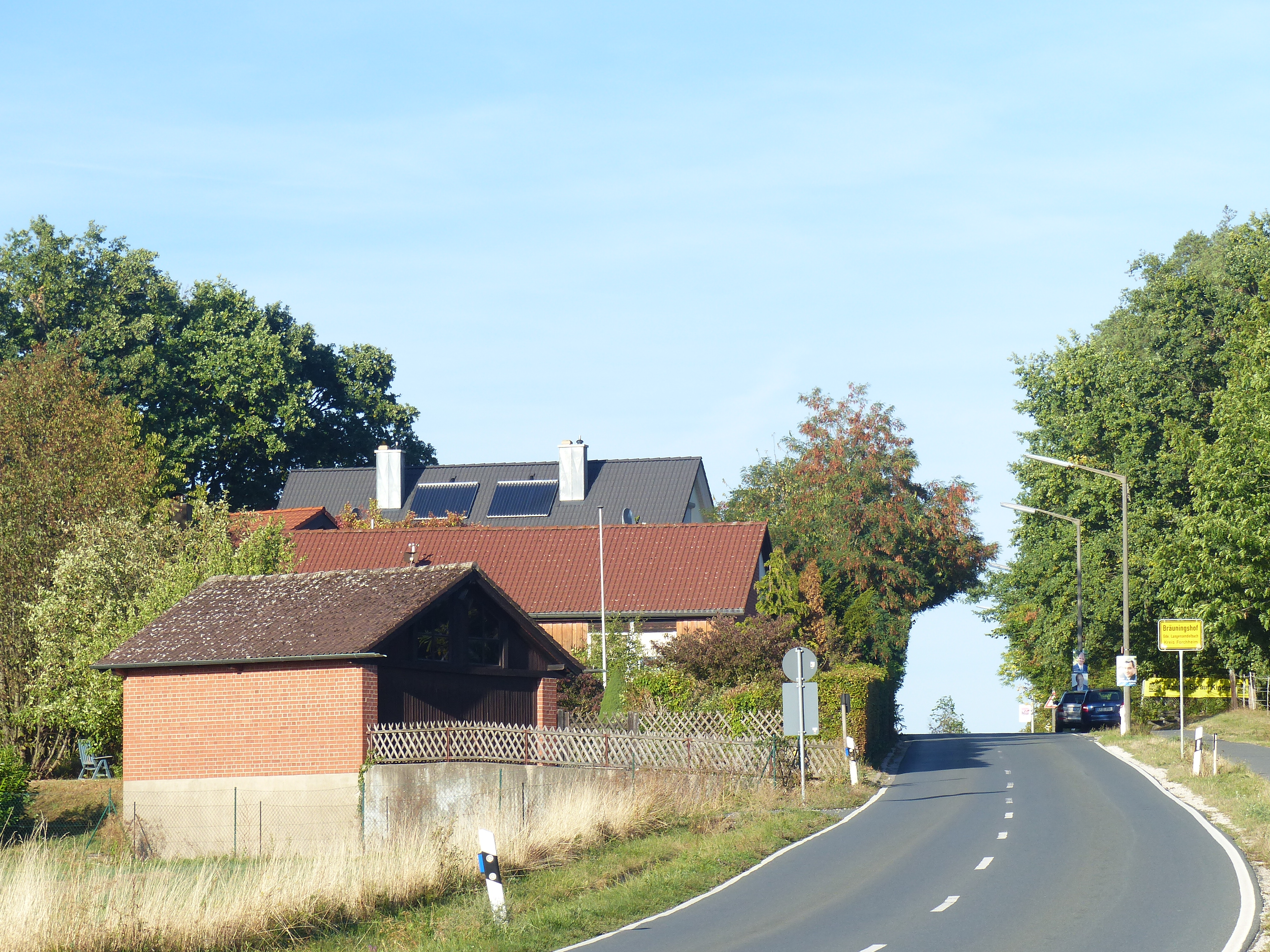
The church of Bräuningshof village, part of the municipality of Langensendelbach

Bräuningshof is a district of Langensendelbach in the Upper Franconian district of Forchheim. It lies between the cities of Erlangen and Forchheim. In this formerly rural town, most of the inhabitants go to work in Erlangen today.

The name of the village Bräuningshof was first mentioned with Bruningeshoven in 1158. It is traced back to the family name "Bräuning" or "Bruning", which at that time often occurred in Franconia.
