= Zeegendorf =

- Ortsteil of Strullendorf
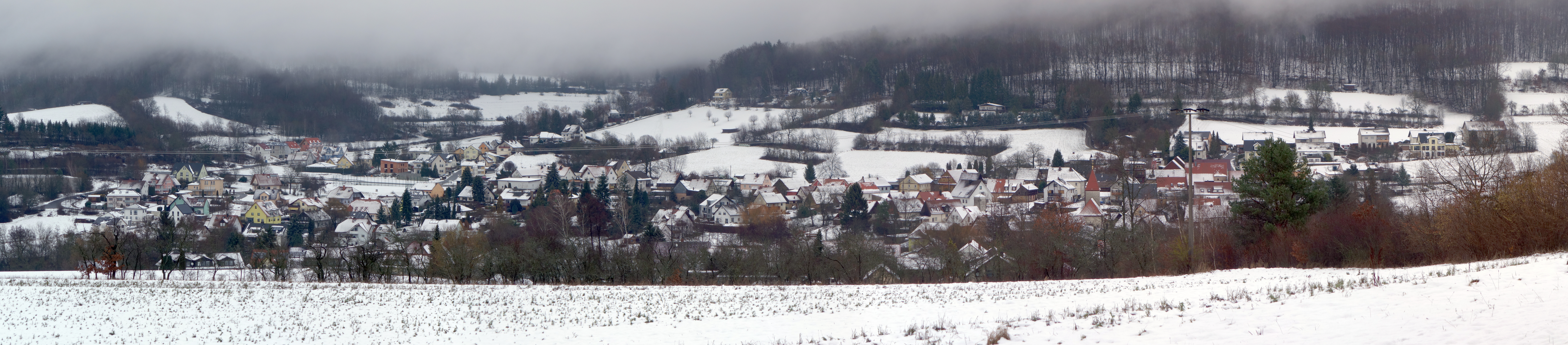
- Interactive map of Zeegendorf
- Location within Germany Location within Bavaria
- Coordinates: 49°52′N 11°4′E
- Country: Germany
- State: Bavaria
- Admin. region: Oberfranken
- District: Bamberg
- Municipality: Strullendorf
- Elevation: 400 m (1,300 ft)

Population (2010-12-31)
  - Total: 572
- Time zone: UTC+01:00 (CET)
  - Summer (DST): UTC+02:00 (CEST)
- Postal codes: 96129

Zeegendorf is a small village located in Bavaria, Germany. It is in Oberfranken (Upper Franconia), in the Bamberg district. Zeegendorf is a constituent community of Strullendorf.

== Geography ==
A stream called the Zeegenbach has its source east of the village, and then flows through the village.

The village has an elevation of about 400 meters.

Zeegendorf lies in the nature park "Naturpark Fränkische Schweiz - Veldensteiner Forst."

== History ==
The first mention of the village was by Bishop Otto of Bamberg on July 25, 1109.

The village, along with several others in the area, fell victim to Swedish troops during the Thirty Years' War in 1633.

The building of a church, St. Josef, was completed in 1952, and was consecrated on August 24 of that year. Three bells were installed in the church in 1966. In 1970, the village established a cemetery.

The village became incorporated into the community of Strullendorf on May 1, 1978.

In 2009, the village celebrated its 900-year anniversary with a festival.

== Culture ==
There are several community organizations in Zeegendorf:

- Marksmen/Sport-Shooting Club: "Schützenverein St. Hubertus Zeegendorf 1957 e.V."
- Veteran's Group: "Soldatenkameradschaft Zeegendorf"
- Volunteer Fire Department: "Freiwillige Feuerwehr Zeegendorf"

Several businesses are in Zeegendorf, including a restaurant which has been open since 1964, known as “Gasthaus Stark.”

The village's yearly Kirchweih (church consecration festival) is held on the Sunday after Assumption Day ("Maria Himmelfahrt"); however, when Assumption Day falls on a Sunday, then the Kirchweih is a week later.

Year	Population
2009	564
2010	572

== Infrastructure ==
Zeegendorf lies on the Staatsstraße 2188.
