= Lisa Badum =

German politician (born 1983)

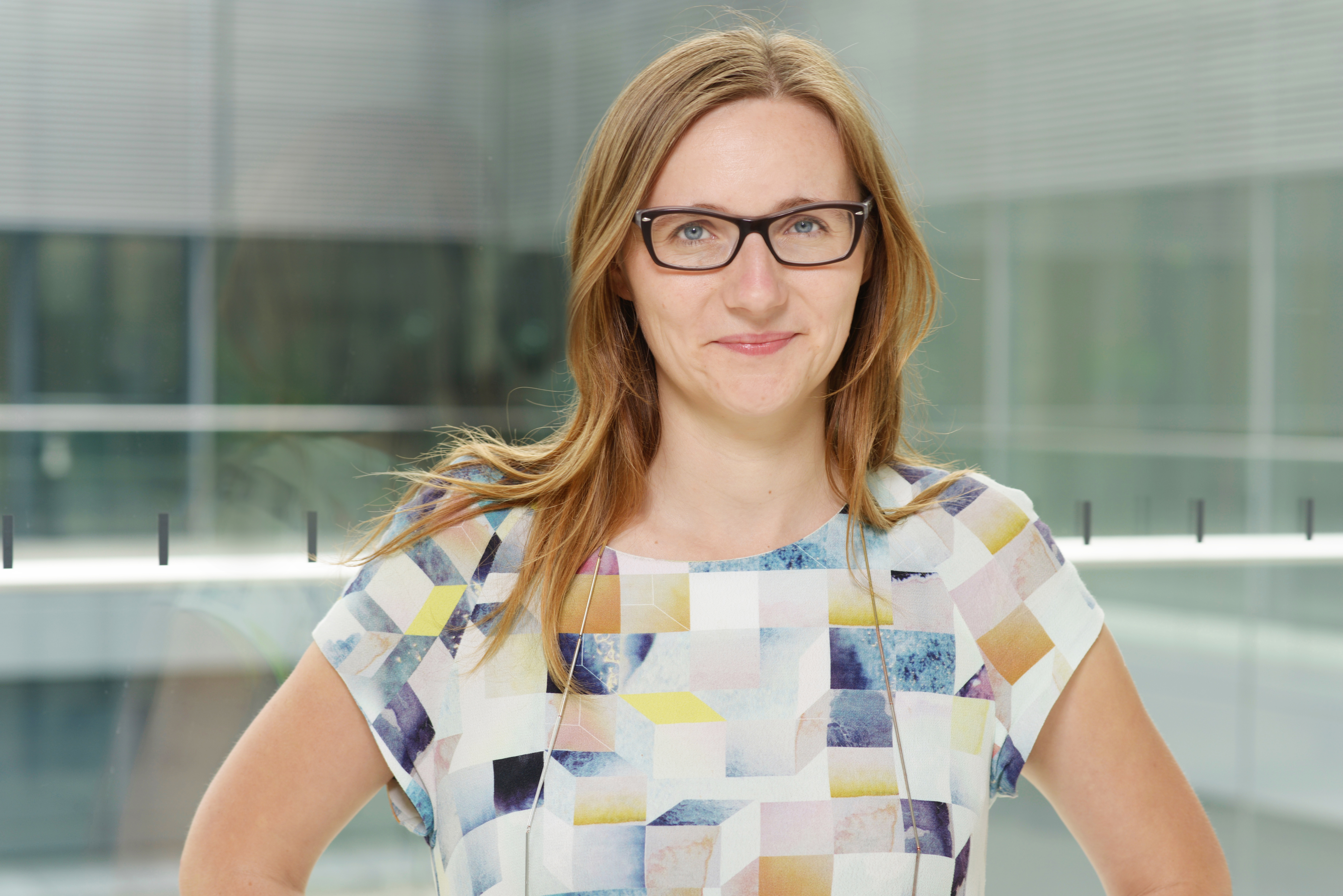
- Badum in 2020

Member of the Bundestag
- Incumbent
- Assumed office 2017

Personal details
- Born: 2 October 1983 (age 42) Forchheim
- Party: Greens
- Education: University of Bamberg

Lisa Hildegard Badum (born 2 October 1983) is a German politician of Alliance 90/The Greens. She has been a member of the Bundestag since the 2017 German federal election, after two failed attempts.

== Early life and education ==
From 2003 to 2010, Badum studied political science at the University of Bamberg.

== Life ==
From 1990 to 1994, Badum attended the Anna primary school in Forchheim. After graduating from the local Ehrenbürg-Gymnasium in 2003, she began studying political science at the Otto Friedrich University of Bamberg in the same year, which she successfully completed in 2010. She spent two semesters of her studies in Thessaloniki, Greece. Badum is a Roman Catholic.

== Political career ==
Badum joined Bündnis 90/Die Grünen in 2005 via the Green University Group and Ursula Sowa, a member of the Bundestag. She has been a district councillor for the district of Forchheim since May 2008. She has been a member of the extended state executive committee since 2012 and a spokesperson for the state working group for women since 2014. From 2010 to autumn 2013, Badum worked as a research assistant in the constituency office of MP Uwe Kekeritz in Fürth. From 2012 until her election to the Bundestag in 2017, she worked in citizen energy at the green energy supplier Naturstrom. From 2016 to 2018, she was district chairwoman of the Greens in Upper Franconia. In December 2008, she was nominated as a Green direct candidate for the 2009 Bundestag election for constituency 236 (Bamberg-Forchheim). She was elected 15th on the Bavarian state list but failed to enter the Bundestag. She failed to do so in the 2013 federal election, coming 13th on the state list. Badum has been a member of the German Bundestag since the 2017 elections. She stood for election in the Bamberg constituency and was elected via her party's statewide list.

In parliament, Badum has since been serving on the Committee on the Environment, Nature Conservation, Building and Nuclear Safety. She is a deputy member of the Committee on Economic Affairs and Energy. She is also her parliamentary group's spokesperson on climate policy.

In the 2021 Bundestag elections, she re-entered the German Bundestag in 8th place on the state list. She is chairwoman of the Committee on Climate Action and Energy and a deputy member of the Committee on Economic Affairs and the Committee on Foreign Affairs. Since April, Badum has been chairwoman of the Subcommittee on International Climate and Energy Policy. Since October 2021, Badum has been President of the Association of German-Greek Societies. She is also the founder and Chair of the Parliamentary Group for Brewing Culture. Since 2022, she has been chairing the Subcommittee on International Climate and Energy Policy.

== Positions ==
For Badum, the fight against the climate crisis is a global and intergenerational challenge. Her particular focus is on the socially just implementation of the Paris climate targets, whereby she sees an ambitious coal phase-out plan and the promotion of renewable energies as decisive steps. She criticised the coal phase-out decided by the grand coalition and called for more transparency and a more timely phase-out. Badum is also involved in gender equality, climate money, and the Climate Protection Act issues.

In addition to her work at the federal level, Badum is committed to a fair energy transition at the local level and emphasises the close connection between climate protection and local design. One of her main focuses here was on the abolition of the 10-H rule in Bavaria, as she believes that this makes the expansion of wind energy more difficult. Badum is also committed to the conversion of part of the Steigerwald Nature Park into a national park. At European level, Badum is in favour of the most ambitious climate protection package possible to meet the 1.5-degree target and a comprehensive CO2 border adjustment mechanism (CBAM). She spoke out against the inclusion of nuclear energy and gas in the EU taxonomy. In a global context, Badum warns of the consequences of the climate crisis, which exacerbates existing crises and social injustice and calls for more climate justice. Badum criticises the offer by German Chancellor Olaf Scholz to support Senegal in the planned exploitation of gas fields off its coast.

== Memberships ==
She is a member and on the board of the Steigerwald National Park Association. 2014, she has been a member of the board of the association ‘Bürgerenergie Bayern e. V.’, which campaigns for the expansion of renewable energies through a citizen-centred energy transition and for the decoupling of economic growth and greenhouse gases as well as for a CO2 price.

== Prizes ==
- 2015: Helene Weber Prize for her commitment to local and equal opportunities policy.

== Other activities ==
- German-Israeli Society, Member of the Board (since 2022)
- German Federation for the Environment and Nature Conservation (BUND), Member
- Terre des Femmes, Member
