= Thomas Silberhorn =

German lawyer and politician (born 1968)

Thomas Silberhorn MdB
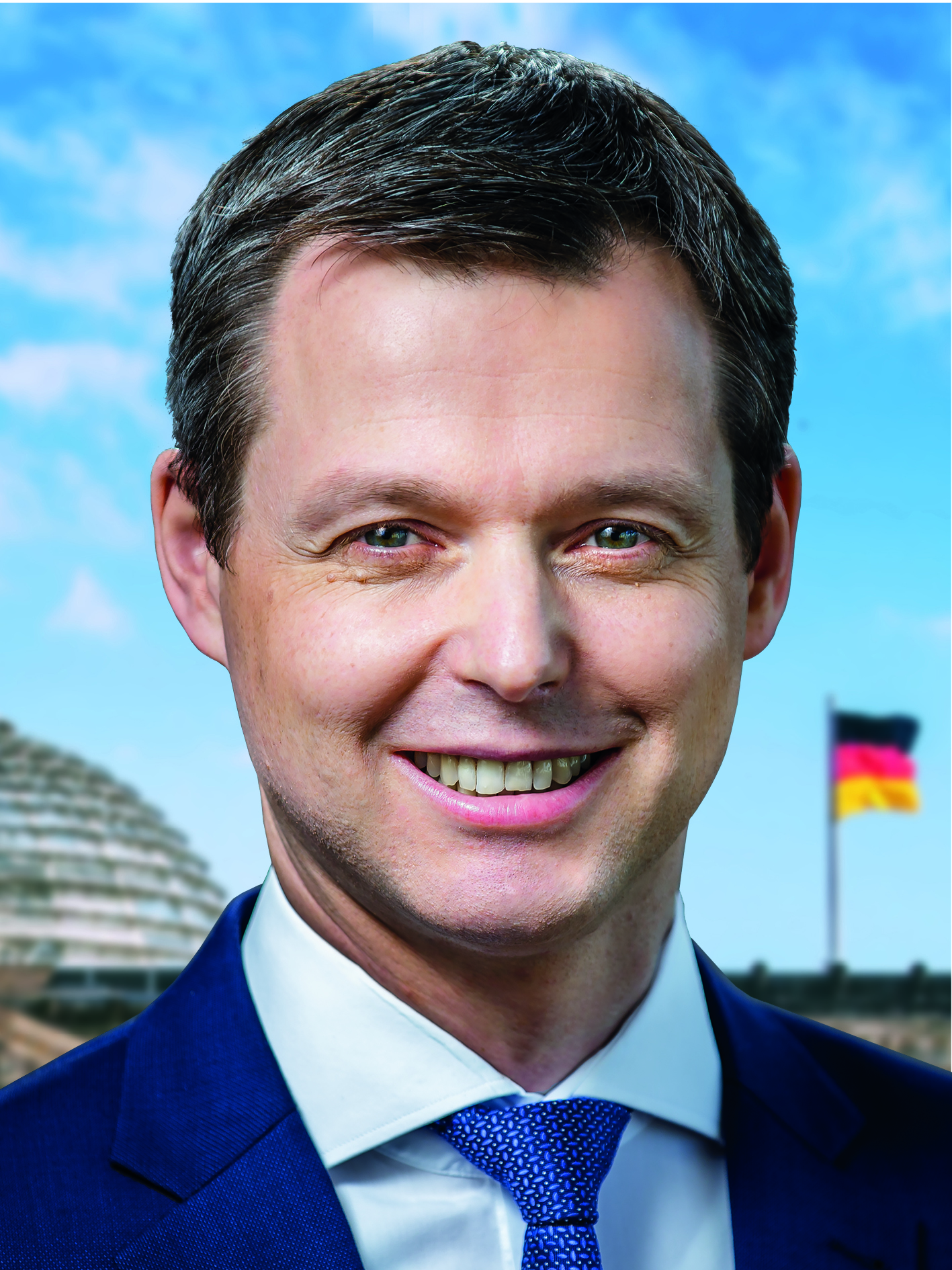
- Silberhorn in 2016

Member of the Bundestag; for Bamberg
- Incumbent
- Assumed office 17 October 2002
- Preceded by: Gerhard Scheu

Personal details
- Born: 12 November 1968 (age 57) Kemmern, West Germany
- Party: Christian Social Union
- Children: 2
- Education: University of Erlangen; University of Bayreuth; LMU Munich

Thomas Silberhorn (born 12 November 1968) is a German lawyer and politician of the Christian Social Union (CSU) who has been serving as a member of the Bundestag from the state of Bavaria since 2002.

== Political career ==
Silberhorn first became a member of the Bundestag in the 2002 German federal election. He has served on the Committee on European Affairs (2002-2013); the Subcommittee on Foreign Trade (2005-2009); and the Committee on Legal Affairs (2009-2013). In addition to his committee assignments, he is a member of the German-Japanese Parliamentary Friendship Group.

In the negotiations to form a coalition government of the Christian Democrats (CSU together with the CDU) and the FDP following the 2009 federal elections, Silberhorn was part of the CDU/CSU delegation in the working group on foreign affairs, defense, Europe and development policy, led by Franz Josef Jung and Werner Hoyer. In the negotiations to form a Grand Coalition of the Christian Democrats and the Social Democrats (SPD) following the 2013 federal elections, Silberhorn was part of the CDU/CSU delegation in the working group on bank regulation and the Eurozone, led by Herbert Reul and Martin Schulz.

In the third cabinet of Chancellor Angela Merkel from 2013 to 2017, Silberhorn served as Parliamentary State Secretary at the Federal Ministry of Economic Cooperation and Development under minister Gerd Müller.

In the negotiations to form another coalition government under Merkel's leadership following the 2017 federal elections, Silberhorn was part of the working group on foreign policy, led by Ursula von der Leyen, Gerd Müller and Sigmar Gabriel.

From 2018 until 2021, Silberhorn served (alongside Peter Tauber) as one of two Parliamentary State Secretaries at the Federal Ministry of Defence under successive ministers Ursula von der Leyen (2018–2019) and Annegret Kramp-Karrenbauer (2019–2021).

In 2019, Silberhorn co-chaired the CSU's convention in Munich, alongside Markus Blume and Florian Hahn.

Since the 2021 elections, Silberhorn has been serving as his parliamentary group's spokesperson for Transatlantic relations.

In the negotiations to form a Grand Coalition between the Christian Democrats (CDU together with the Bavarian CSU) under the leadership of Friedrich Merz and the Social Democratic Party (SPD) following the 2025 German elections, Silberhorn was part of the CDU/CSU delegation in the working group on education, research and innovation policy, led by Karin Prien, Katrin Staffler and Oliver Kaczmarek.

== Other activities ==
- European Academy of Bavaria, Member of the Board of Trustees
- African Development Bank (AfDB), Ex-Officio Member of the Board of Governors (2013–2018)
- Deutsche Welle, Member of the Broadcasting Council (2013–2018)
- German Foundation for Peace Research (DSF), Member of the Board (2013–2018)
- German Institute for International and Security Affairs (SWP), Member of the Council (2013–2018)
- Federal Agency for Civic Education (BPB), Member of the Board of Trustees (2002–2005)

== Political positions ==
In June 2017, Silberhorn voted against Germany's introduction of same-sex marriage.
