= Schloss Wernsdorf =

German castle

Coordinates: 49°51′34″N 11°0′33″E

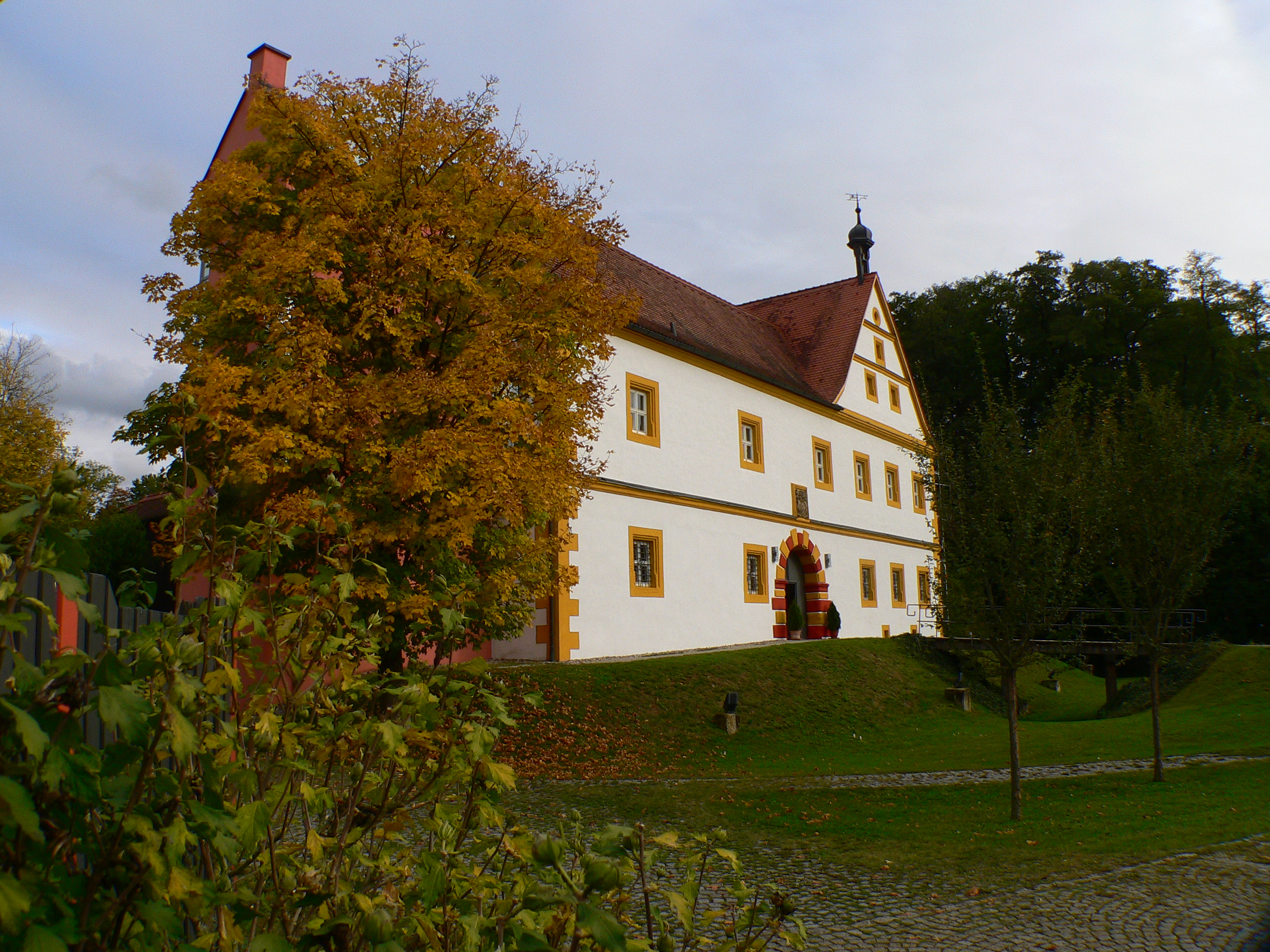
Schloss Wernsdorf

Schloss Wernsdorf is a medieval castle located in the village of Wernsdorf, in Upper Franconia, Bavaria. The castle also has a small park. The oldest parts of the castle can be dated back to the 12th century.

The castle is the home of the Privaten Akademie für Alte Musik, Kunst- und Kulturgeschichte Europas e. V. (the Private Academy for Early Music, Art and Cultural History of Europe), through which the medieval music group Capella Antiqua Bambergensis, under the direction of Wolfgang Spindler, was founded.

== History ==
Schloss Wernsdorf supposedly stands on the remains of a fortified castle that was built in 790 AD by Charlemagne. This castle was one of the Eckpunkte des Abendlandes (the “cornerstones of the West”), and was on a trade route that led into the Slavic countries. The structure that stands there today was first documented in 1114. The Bishop of Bamberg at that time was the lord of the castle.

In 1620, the Bishop Johann Gottfried I. von Aschhausen further developed the castle. It was then used as a hunting lodge, and had next to it a sheep stall, hops garden and a brewery.

In 1803, the castle chapel and the fortified wall encircling the inner courtyard were demolished. In the following years, the property deteriorated quickly from the inside, due mainly to frequently changing owners, until the royal forester Andreas Eisfelder restored the castle in 1896. After 1945, the castle served as refugee accommodations.

In 1993, the Capella Antiqua Bambergensis bought the property, which had again fallen into poor condition. The timber framing was almost completely destroyed by dry rot and wood worms. The floors were molded, and in several places the ceilings had collapsed. There was no electricity, no sanitation and no heating. After over 30,000 hours of work, the music group re-opened the castle and the park to the public.

== Modern use ==
The castle today accommodates the Private Akademie für Alte Musik, Kunst- und Kulturgeschichte Europas e. V. It serves as the venue for the Capella Antiqua Bambergensis and other medieval music groups. In addition, the following activities are offered:

- Lessons on the historical musical instruments of our ancestors for children, adolescents, adults, seniors and entire families
- Performance practice courses for ensembles
- Lectures on music history and humanities
- Lectures on art and cultural history
- Courses on historical musical instruments
- Courses for the integration of new media in the music research

== Miscellaneous ==
The Private Akademie was commissioned in 2002 by Bavarian Culture Minister Hans Zehetmair to build a digital documentation center for early music in Bavaria.

In addition to various other awards, Wolfgang Spindler received the Federal Cross of Merit of 2002.

For the specific work in terms of music and social-aspects, the Bavarian government awarded Capella Antiqua Bambergensis a prize, named the Kulturpreis Bayern der E.ON Bayern AG, in 2006.

== See also ==
- List of castles in Bavaria
