= Langensendelbach =

- Municipality
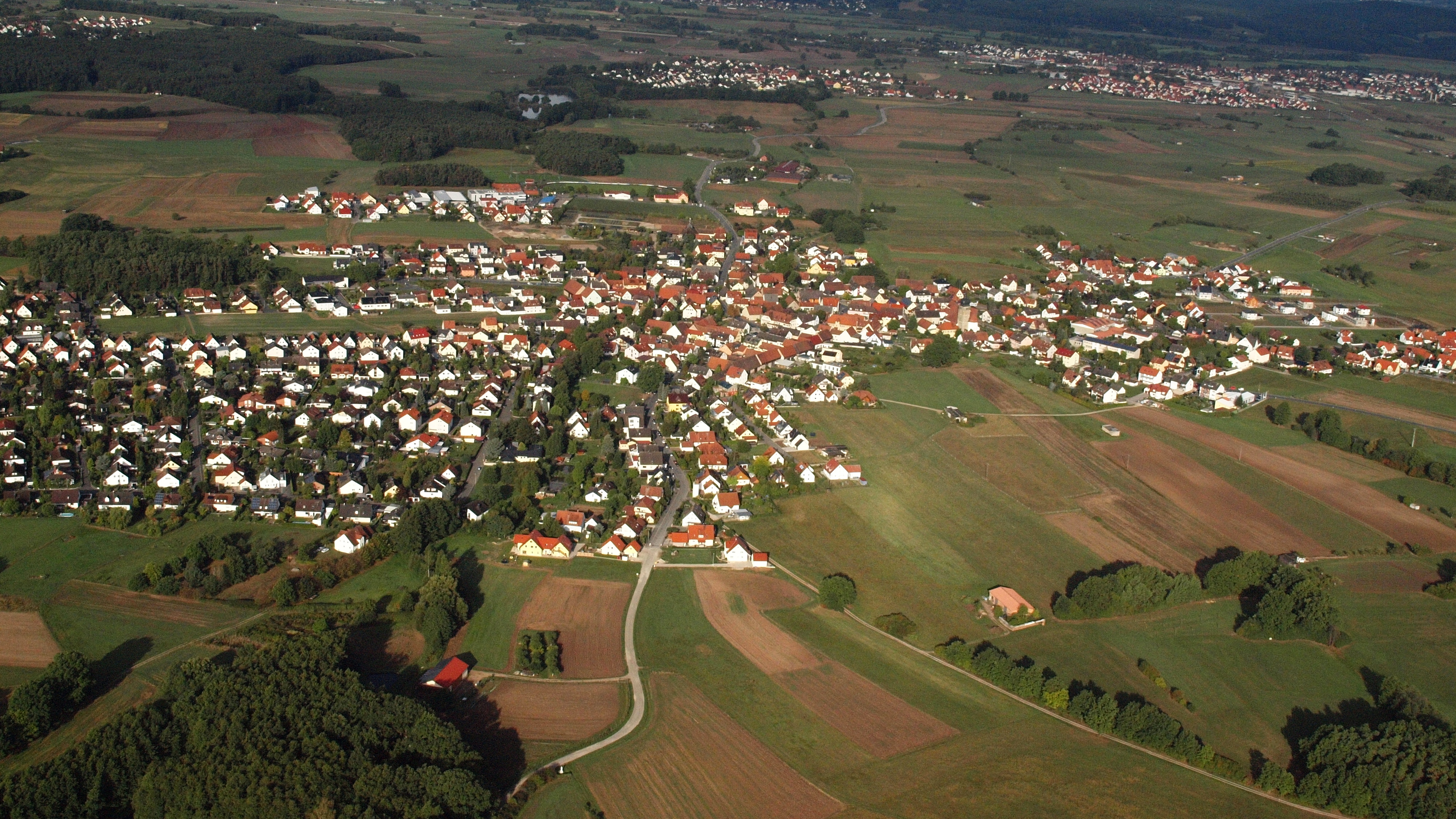
- Aerial view

- Coat of arms

- Location of Langensendelbach within Forchheim district
- Interactive map of Langensendelbach
- Location within Germany Location within Bavaria
- Coordinates: 49°39′N 11°04′E
- Country: Germany
- State: Bavaria
- Admin. region: Oberfranken
- District: Forchheim
- Subdivisions: 2 Ortsteile

Government
  - Mayor (2020–26): Oswald Siebenhaar

Area
  - Total: 9.59 km^{2} (3.70 sq mi)
- Elevation: 296 m (971 ft)

Population (2025-12-31)
  - Total: 3,080
  - Density: 321/km^{2} (832/sq mi)
- Time zone: UTC+01:00 (CET)
  - Summer (DST): UTC+02:00 (CEST)
- Postal codes: 91094
- Dialling codes: 09133
- Vehicle registration: FO
- Website: www.langensendelbach.de

Langensendelbach is a municipality in the district of Forchheim in Bavaria in Germany with a population of over 3100. The village Bräuningshof is a part of Langensendelbach.

Langensendelbach was first mentioned on 13 July 1062. Thereafter Langensendelbach was a part of the bistum Bamberg. In 1400 St Peter and Paul chapel was built, and in the fourteenth and fifteenth century a small gothic church was built. In 1896 the priest Wölfel found an old German bodygrave from the fifth century. In World War I twenty two men from Langensendelbach died. In World War II eighty eight men had to fight; nineteen of them died in the war or in prison. A few days before the War ended, SS troops were in the village; the US Army attacked them, and three children and one man died.
