= Leesten =

Village in Bavaria, Germany

Coordinates: 49°52′N 11°01′E

Leesten is a small village located in Bavaria, Germany. It is in Oberfranken (Upper Franconia), in the Bamberg district. Leesten is a constituent community of Strullendorf.

In 2009, Leesten had a total population of 260.

== Geography ==
Leesten has an elevation of about 300 meters.

== History ==
The origin of the name "Leesten" is from the Slavic word Liescina, which means hazel bushes.

== Culture ==
An organization for fishermen in the Strullendorf community, named the "Anglerverein Strullendorf e.V.", is based in Leesten.

== Infrastructure ==
Leesten lies on the Staatsstraßen 2188 and 2210.
