= Mistendorf =

- Ortsteil of Strullendorf
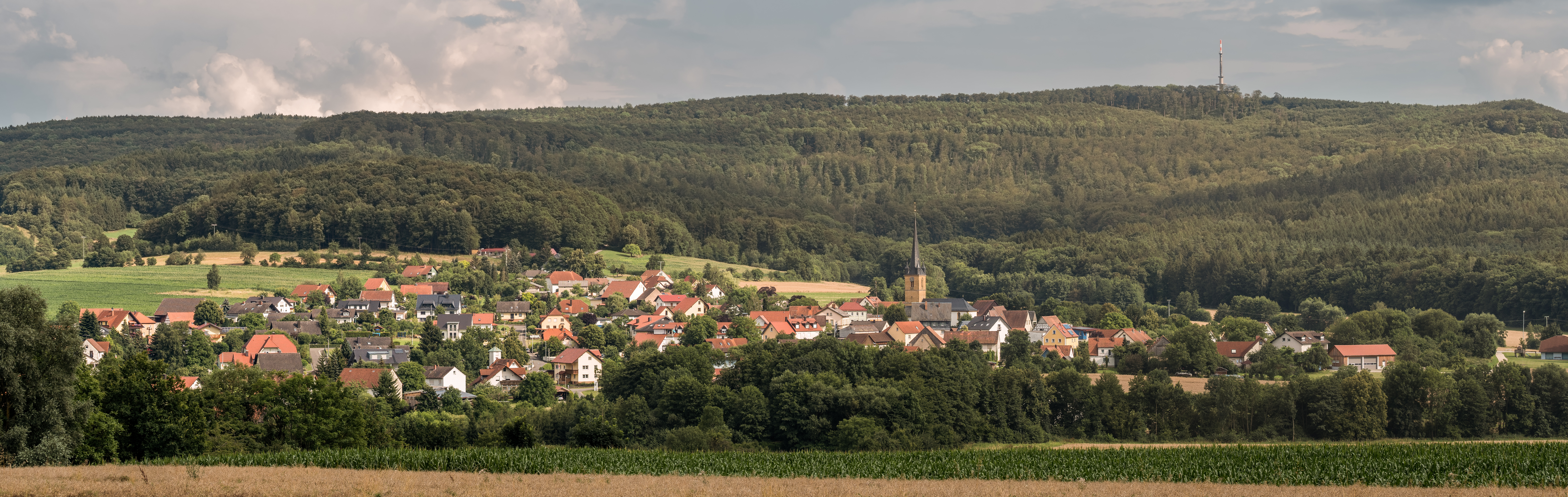
- Interactive map of Mistendorf
- Location within Germany Location within Bavaria
- Coordinates: 49°52′N 11°01′E
- Country: Germany
- State: Bavaria
- Admin. region: Upper Franconia
- District: Bamberg
- Municipality: Strullendorf

Population (2009)
  - Total: 545
- Time zone: UTC+01:00 (CET)
  - Summer (DST): UTC+02:00 (CEST)

Mistendorf is a small village located in Bavaria, Germany. It is in Upper Franconia, in the Bamberg district. Mistendorf is a constituent community of Strullendorf.

In 2009, Mistendorf had a total population of 545.

== Geography ==
Mistendorf is about 8 kilometers east from Strullendorf.

Mistendorf lies in the nature park "Naturpark Fränkische Schweiz - Veldensteiner Forst."

== Infrastructure ==
=== Factory ===
"Denzlein Josef GmbH" has a factory in Mistendorf; they make windows, doors, stairs and sunrooms.

=== Traffic ===
Mistendorf lies on the Staatsstraße 2188.

== Culture ==
There are several community organizations in Mistendorf:

- Sports Club: "DJK-Sportclub Mistendorf 1983 e.V."
- Volunteer Fire Department: "Freiwillige Feuerwehr Mistendorf"
