= Hausen, Upper Franconia =

Hausen
- Municipality
- Coat of arms

- Location of Hausen within Forchheim district
- Interactive map of Hausen
- Location within Germany Location within Bavaria
- Coordinates: 49°40′N 11°02′E
- Country: Germany
- State: Bavaria
- Admin. region: Oberfranken
- District: Forchheim
- Subdivisions: 2 Ortsteile

Government
  - Mayor (2020–26): Bernd Ruppert (CSU)

Area
  - Total: 13.53 km^{2} (5.22 sq mi)
- Elevation: 271 m (889 ft)

Population (2025-12-31)
  - Total: 3,658
  - Density: 270.4/km^{2} (700.2/sq mi)
- Time zone: UTC+01:00 (CET)
  - Summer (DST): UTC+02:00 (CEST)
- Postal codes: 91353
- Dialling codes: 09191, 09190
- Vehicle registration: FO
- Website: www.hausen.de

Hausen (German pronunciation: [ˈhaʊzn̩]) is a municipality in the district of Forchheim in Bavaria in Germany.
