= Amlingstadt =

- Ortsteil of Strullendorf
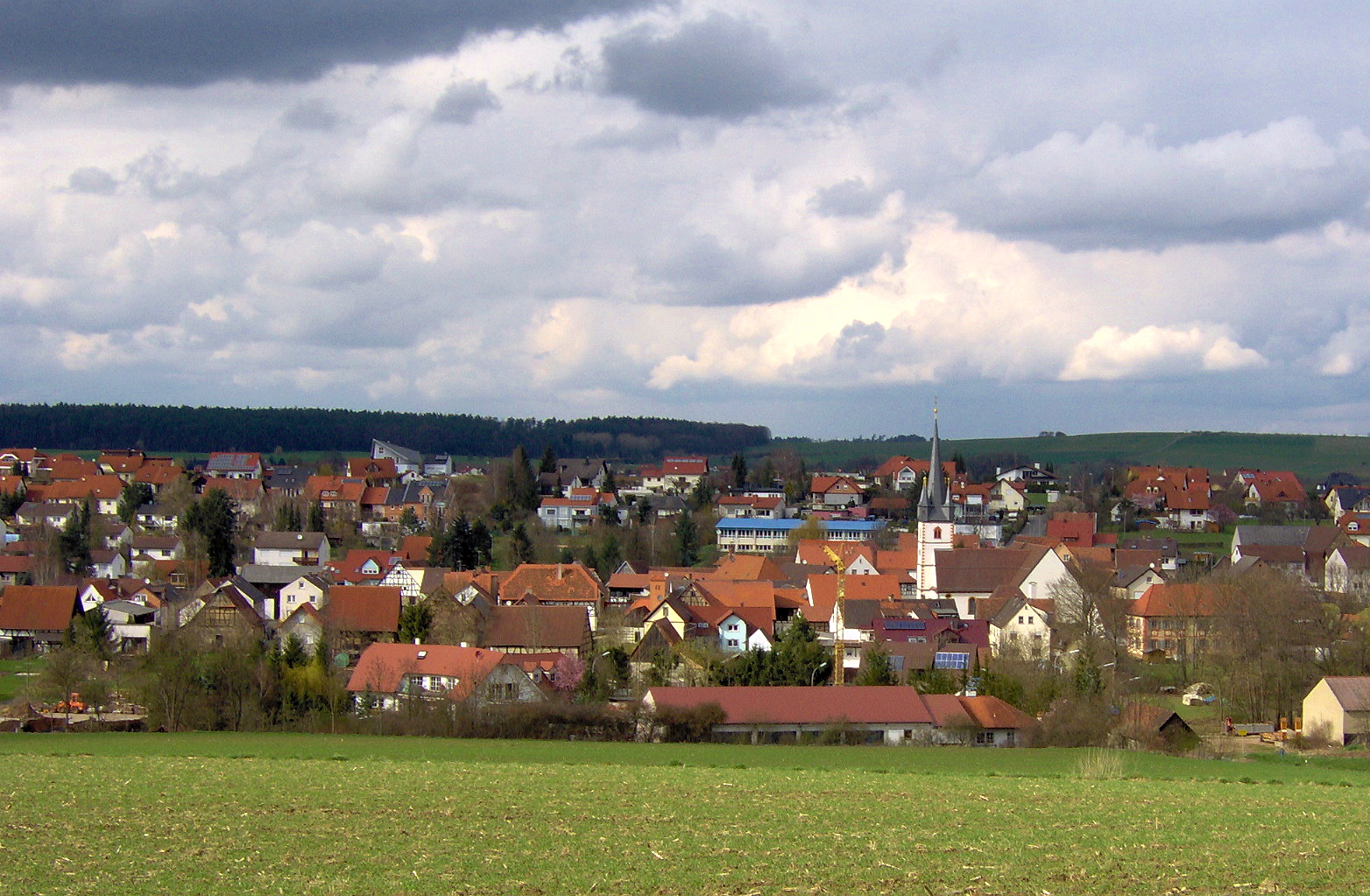
- Interactive map of Amlingstadt
- Location within Germany Location within Bavaria
- Coordinates: 49°51′N 11°00′E
- Country: Germany
- State: Bavaria
- Admin. region: Upper Franconia
- District: Bamberg
- Municipality: Strullendorf
- Elevation: 270 m (890 ft)

Population (2009)
  - Total: 687
- Time zone: UTC+01:00 (CET)
  - Summer (DST): UTC+02:00 (CEST)

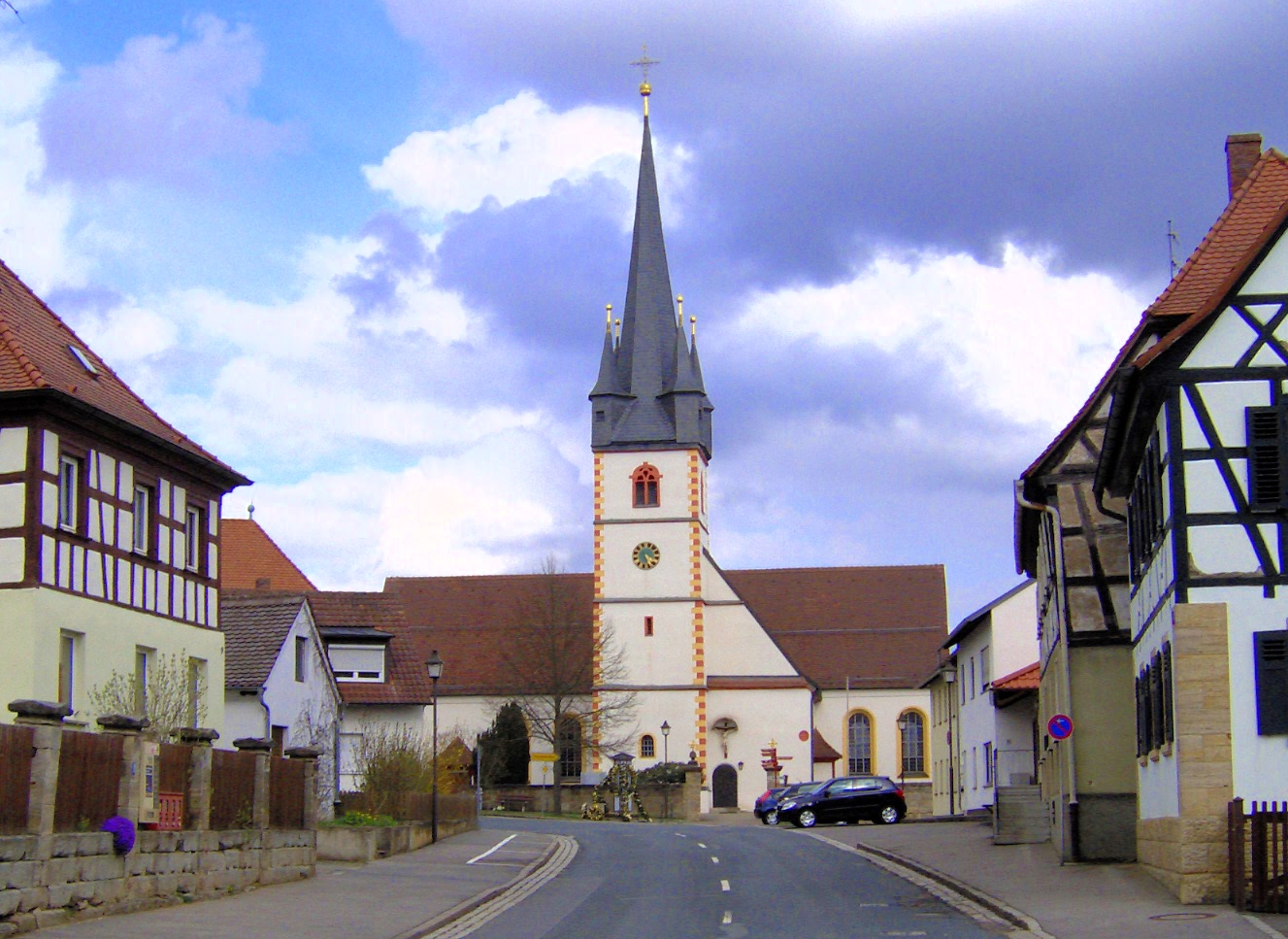
St. Ägidius Church in Amlingstadt

Amlingstadt is a small village located in Bavaria, Germany. It is in Upper Franconia, in the Bamberg district. Amlingstadt is a constituent community of Strullendorf.

In 2009, Amlingstadt had a total population of 687.

== Geography ==
The village lies about 7 kilometers south-east from Bamberg, at the edge of the Hauptsmoorwald forest.

Amlingstadt is connected with its neighboring village, Wernsdorf.

Amlingstadt has an elevation of about 270 meters.

== History ==
In the 1970s, the foundations of a small stone church were excavated in Amlingstadt. It was one of 14 mission churches of the Würzburg bishops, as part of missionary work starting in the 8th century amongst the Slavs in the Main and Regnitz region.

== Culture ==
There are several community organizations in Amlingstadt:

- Organization for Seniors: "Seniorentanz"
- Veteran's Group: "Kameraden- & Soldatenverein Amlingstadt-Roßdorf"

== Infrastructure ==
Amlingstadt lies on the Staatsstraße 2188.
