= Sebastian Körber =

German politician (born 1980)

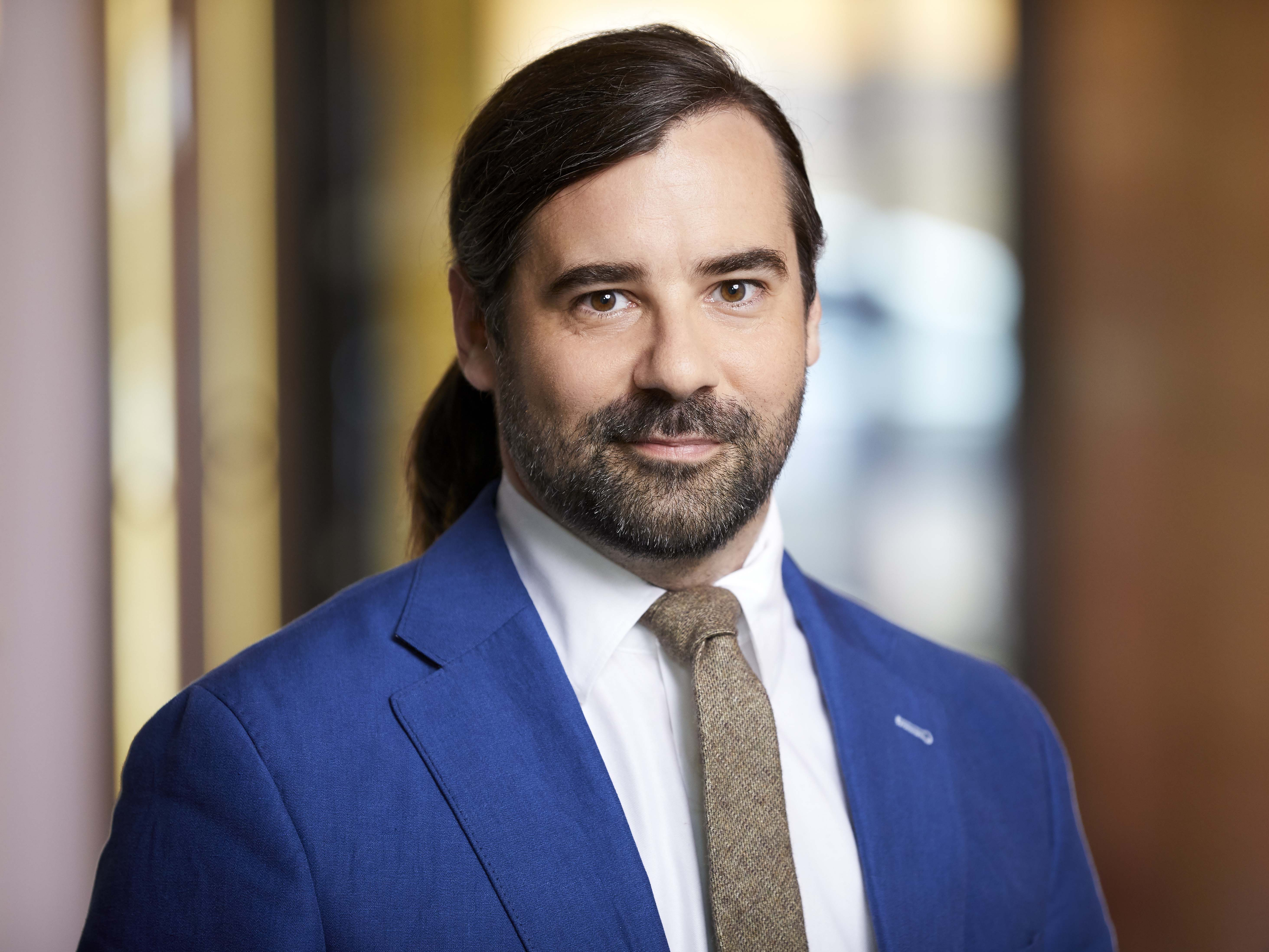
- Körber in 2019

Member of the Bundestag
- In office 27 October 2009 – 22 October 2013
- Constituency: Bavaria

Personal details
- Born: 5 May 1980 (age 46) Forchheim
- Party: Free Democratic Party

Sebastian Körber (born 5 May 1980 in Forchheim) is a German politician. From 2009 to 2013, he was a member of the Bundestag. From 2018 to 2023, he was a member of the Landtag of Bavaria.
