= Wernsdorf (Bavaria) =

- Ortsteil of Strullendorf
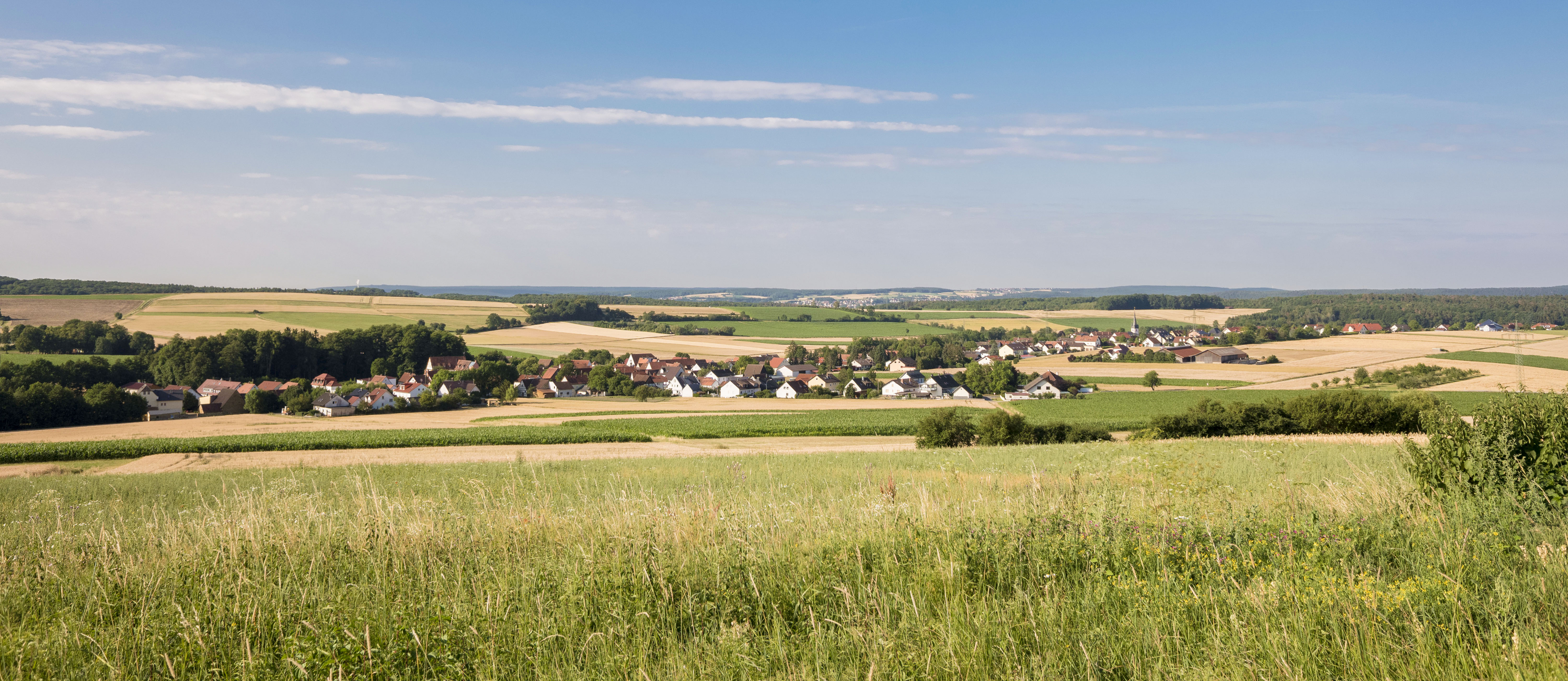
- Interactive map of Wernsdorf
- Location within Germany Location within Bavaria
- Coordinates: 49°51′32″N 11°00′32″E
- Country: Germany
- State: Bavaria
- Admin. region: Upper Franconia
- District: Bamberg
- Municipality: Strullendorf
- Time zone: UTC+01:00 (CET)
  - Summer (DST): UTC+02:00 (CEST)

Wernsdorf is a small village located in Bavaria, Germany. It is in Upper Franconia, in the Bamberg district. Wernsdorf is a constituent community of Strullendorf and is located on the state roads 2188 and 2210, adjoining the neighbouring village of Amlingstadt. The population was recorded as 444 in 2009.

There is a castle in the town, named the Schloss Wernsdorf.
