= Andreas Schwarz =

German politician (born 1965)

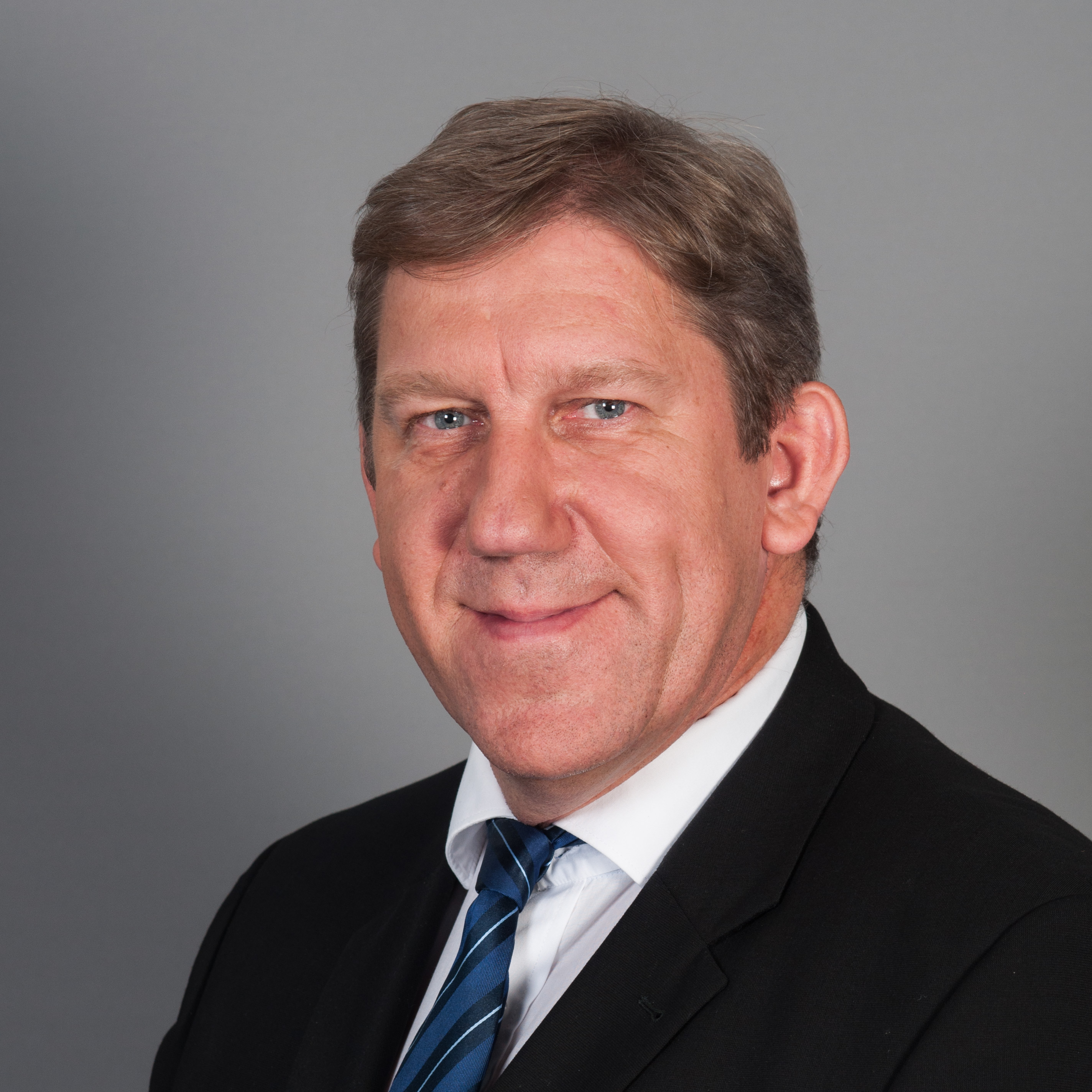
- Andreas Schwarz in 2014

Member of the Bundestag
- Incumbent
- Assumed office 2013

Personal details
- Born: 3 March 1965 (age 61) Berleburg, West Germany (now Germany)
- Party: SPD
- Education: Technische Hochschule Nürnberg

Andreas Schwarz (born 3 March 1965) is a German politician of the Social Democratic Party (SPD) who has been serving as a member of the Bundestag from the state of Bavaria since 2013.

== Political career ==
Schwarz became a member of the Bundestag in the 2013 German federal election.

In his first term from 2013 until 2017, Schwarz served on the Finance Committee. Since 2018, he has been a member of the Budget Committee and the Audit Committee. In this capacity, he serves as the SPD parliamentary group's rapporteur on the annual budget of the Federal Ministry of Defence.

Since 2022, he has been a member of the so-called Confidential Committee (Vertrauensgremium) of the Budget Committee, which provides budgetary supervision for Germany's three intelligence services, BND, BfV and MAD. Also 2022, he joined the parliamentary body charged with overseeing a 100 billion euro special fund to strengthen Germany's armed forces.

In 2026, following Germany's rearmament drive, Schwarz was more actively vetoing contracts or demanding cuts to their value, citing concerns around value for money. This included a €600mn contract for a mobile reconnaissance system and a €462mn deal to build an anti-drone laser system for ships.

== Other activities ==
- German United Services Trade Union (ver.di), Member
