= Pettstadt =

- Municipality
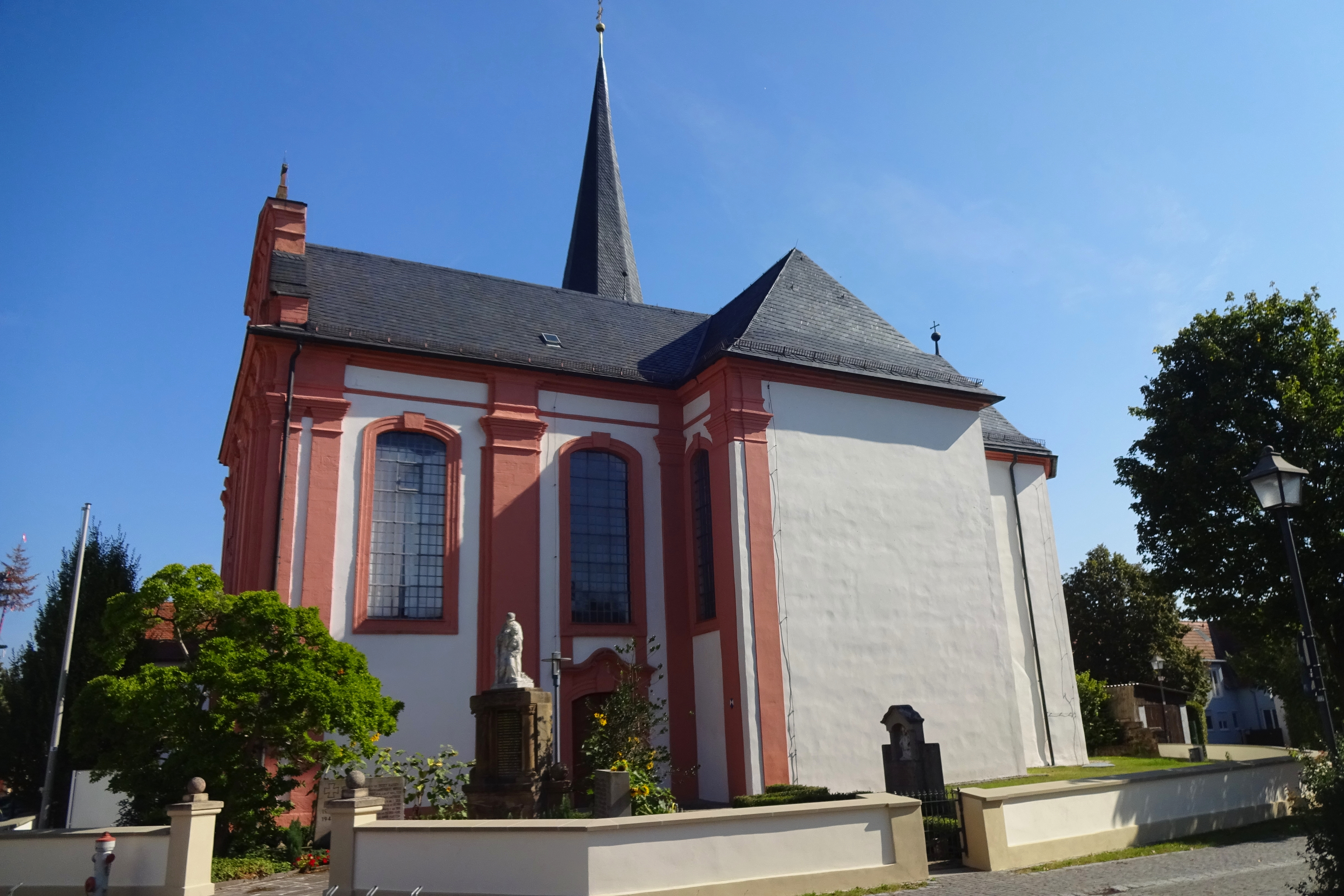
- Church of the Nativity of the Virgin Mary

- Coat of arms

- Location of Pettstadt within Bamberg district
- Interactive map of Pettstadt
- Location within Germany Location within Bavaria
- Coordinates: 49°50′N 10°46′E
- Country: Germany
- State: Bavaria
- Admin. region: Oberfranken
- District: Bamberg

Government
  - Mayor (2020–26): Jochen Hack (FW)

Area
  - Total: 9.88 km^{2} (3.81 sq mi)
- Elevation: 246 m (807 ft)

Population (2025-12-31)
  - Total: 2,244
  - Density: 227/km^{2} (588/sq mi)
- Time zone: UTC+01:00 (CET)
  - Summer (DST): UTC+02:00 (CEST)
- Postal codes: 96175
- Dialling codes: 09502
- Vehicle registration: BA
- Website: www.pettstadt.de

Pettstadt is a municipality in the Upper Franconian district of Bamberg with about 1,900 inhabitants.

== Geography ==
The community lies in the Regierungsbezirk of Oberfranken (Upper Franconia), roughly 8 km south of Bamberg where the Rauhe Ebrach empties into the Regnitz.

=== Constituent communities ===
Pettstadt’s main and namesake centre is by far the biggest of its Gemeindeteile with a population of 1,914. The community furthermore has these outlying centres, each given here with its own population figure:

- Eichenhof: 25
- Neuhaus: 24
- Schadlos: 17

The community also has one of the traditional rural land units known in German as Gemarkungen, named Pettstadt, the same name as the main centre (it is traditional for a Gemarkung to be named after a town or village lying nearby).

== History ==
The community had its first documentary mention in 1070 as Betestat. The placename goes back to a personal name, Petto, which around the year 1000 was quite common in the Frankish-Thuringian area. In 1399 came the establishment of the parish of Pettstadt. In 1754, the Baroque church was built under architect Johann Jakob Michael Küchel. The community belonged to the Cathedral Chapter of Bamberg of the High Monastery at Bamberg, and with the Reichsdeputationshauptschluss of 1803, the community passed to Bavaria. In the course of administrative reform in Bavaria, today’s community came into being under the Gemeindeedikt (“Community Edict”) of 1818. In 2002, the administrative community (Verwaltungsgemeinschaft) with Frensdorf, which had been instituted in the course of later administrative reform, was dissolved.

=== Population development ===
Within municipal limits, Pettstadt has registered following number of inhabitants:

- 1,041 (1970)
- 1,411 (1987)
- 1,829 (2000)
- 1,923 (2007)
- 1,900 (2011)

== Politics ==
The mayor is Jochen Hack (Freie Wählergemeinschaft), first elected in 2014 and re-elected in 2020.

The community council is made up of 12 members, listed here by party or voter community affiliation, and also with the number of seats that each holds:

- FWG (Freie Wählergemeinschaft): 5
- CSU (Christlich-Soziale Union): 3
- BNL (Bürgernahe Liste): 2
- SPD (Sozialdemokratische Partei Deutschlands): 2

In 1999, municipal tax revenue, converted to euros, amounted to €708,000 of which business taxes (net) amounted to €127,000.

== Culture and sightseeing ==
Pettstadt has something rather remarkable for a place of its size, namely a Baroque church by the famous master builder Michael Küchel, the parish Church of the Nativity of the Virgin Mary.

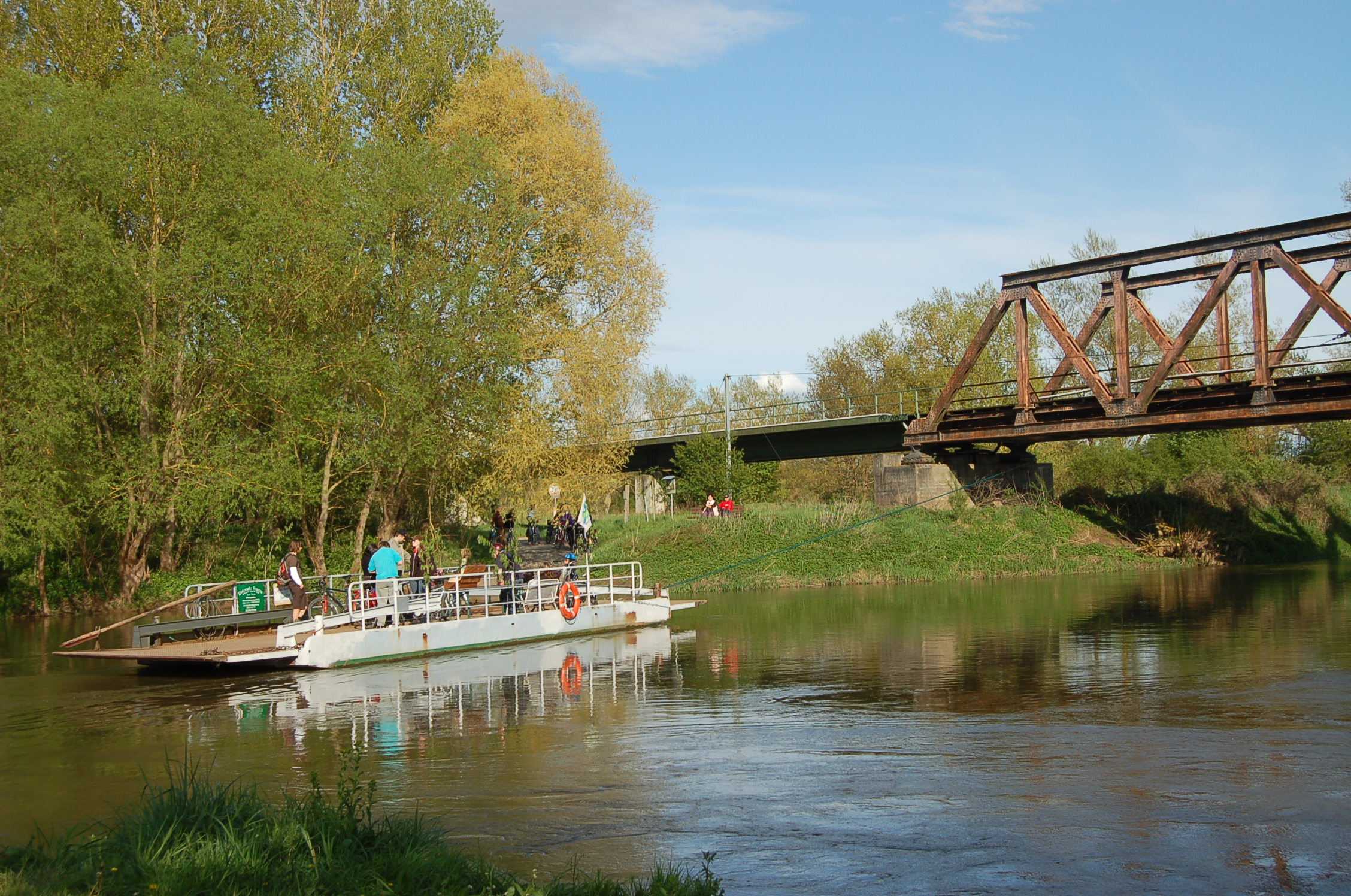
Pettstadt ferry

One curiosity in Pettstadt is the Pettstadter Schmied, Upper Franconia’s only reaction ferry, which crosses the Regnitz not far west of the village and is used mainly by cyclists. The original Pettstadter Schmied (German for “Pettstadt smith”) is the main character in a story that is well known throughout the region. It tells of master smith Sebastian Schubert, who died in 1910. About the turn of the 20th century, it is said that, at a very late hour at an inn, he would not comply with a gendarmerie patrol’s order to leave the inn. Instead, he said “Des mach ich, wie ich mooch” (dialectal German for “I do whatever I like”). The incident led to charges. The judge at the Royal Bavarian Amt Court, however, acquitted the accused citing an apparent lack of abusive or rebellious attitude. From this developed a well known Upper Franconian expression: Mach' es wie der Pettstadter Schmied (“Do it like the Pettstadt smith”), which is taken as a demand to decide on one’s own authority.

=== Sports and clubs ===
From the local club life have grown many events such as the Pettstadt Street Festival (Straßenfest) on the third weekend in July, which is attended by citizens from all over the district.

The three biggest clubs, the Sportverein Pettstadt (SVP, a sport club), the Freihand Schützenverein Pettstadt (FSV, a shooting club) and the Rauhe Ebrach angling club are successful even beyond the local region.
