= Geisberg (Geisberg Forest) =

- Location within Bavaria

Highest point
- Elevation: 585 m (1,919 ft)
- Coordinates: 49°53′20″N 11°03′45″E

Geography
- Location: Bavaria, Germany

The Geisberg (German pronunciation: [ˈɡaɪsbɛʁk]) is a hill in Bavaria, Germany.
