= Frensdorf =

- Municipality
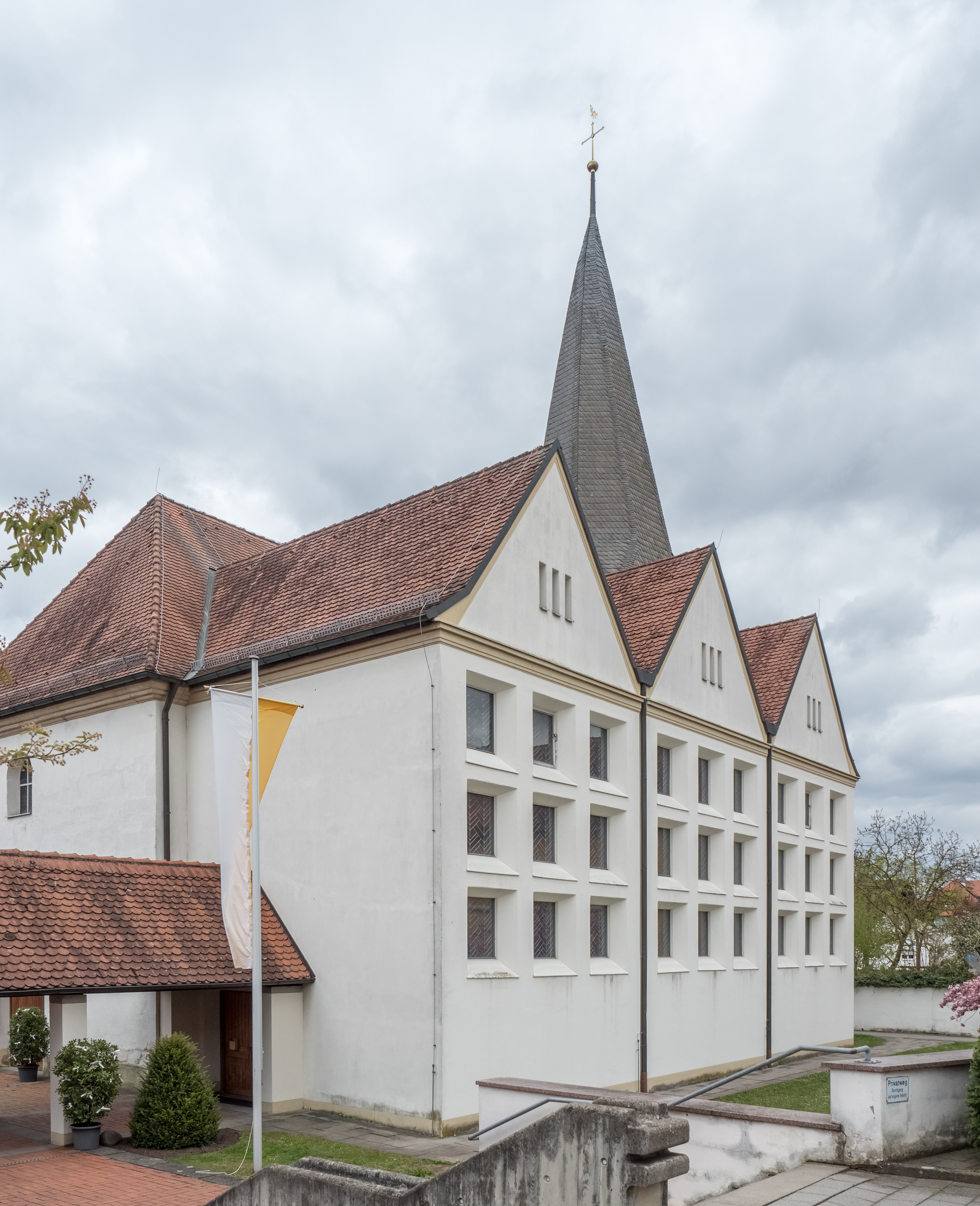
- Saint John Church

- Coat of arms

- Location of Frensdorf within Bamberg district
- Interactive map of Frensdorf
- Location within Germany Location within Bavaria
- Coordinates: 49°49′N 10°51′E
- Country: Germany
- State: Bavaria
- Admin. region: Oberfranken
- District: Bamberg
- Subdivisions: 14 Gemeindeteile

Government
  - Mayor (2020–26): Jakobus Kötzner

Area
  - Total: 43.96 km^{2} (16.97 sq mi)
- Elevation: 255 m (837 ft)

Population (2025-12-31)
  - Total: 5,132
  - Density: 116.7/km^{2} (302.4/sq mi)
- Time zone: UTC+01:00 (CET)
  - Summer (DST): UTC+02:00 (CEST)
- Postal codes: 96158
- Dialling codes: 09502
- Vehicle registration: BA
- Website: www.frensdorf.de

Frensdorf is a municipality in the Upper Franconian district of Bamberg.

== Geography ==
The community lies in Upper Franconia south of Bamberg on the lower reaches of the Rauhe Ebrach.

=== Constituent communities ===
Frensdorf's main and namesake centre is the biggest of its Ortsteile with a population of 1,359, but this makes it only slightly bigger than Reundorf with 1,151. The community furthermore has these other outlying centres, each given here with its own population figure:

- Abtsdorf 286
- Birkach 255
- Ellersdorf 150
- Herrnsdorf 407
- Hundshof 31
- Lonnershof 32
- Obergreuth 109
- Rattelshof 14
- Schlüsselau 365
- Untergreuth 151
- Vorra 335
- Wingersdorf 159

(as of 31 December 2006)

The community also has four traditional rural land units, known in German as Gemarkungen, named Birkach, Frensdorf, Herrnsdorf and Reundorf, the same names as four of the constituent communities (it is traditional for a Gemarkung to be named after a town or village lying nearby).

== History ==
The Lords of Abenberg made Frensdorf into the administrative hub of their holdings in the Bamberg area in the 12th century. They were, like the Andechs Meranians who followed them about 1190, Vögte (sing. Vogt – reeve) of the High Monastery at Bamberg, among whose holdings lay Frensdorf until the Reichsdeputationshauptschluss in 1803, since which time the community has belonged to Bavaria.

=== Population development ===
Within municipal limits, 3,042 inhabitants were counted in 1970, 3,541 in 1987, 4,697 in 2000 and 4,687 in 2006.

== Politics ==
The mayor is Jakobus Kötzner (Aktive Wählerliste).

The community council is made up of 20 members, listed here by party or voter community affiliation, and also with the number of seats that each holds, since the 2020 local elections:

- Frensdorfer Bürgergemeinschaft: 3
- Bürgerliste Reundorf: 3
- Aktive Wählerliste: 3
- CSU/Freie Wählergemeinschaft Frensdorf: 3
- Christliche Wählerliste Abtsdorf, Birkach, Hundshof, Vorra: 2
- Initiative Gemeinde Frensdorf: 2
- Alliance 90/The Greens: 2
- Vereinigte Wähler Vorra-Birkach-Abtsdorf-Hundshof: 2

In 1999, municipal tax revenue, converted to euros, amounted to €1,545,000 of which business taxes (net) amounted to €178,000.

== Economy and infrastructure ==
According to official statistics, there were 17 workers on the social welfare contribution rolls working in agriculture or forestry, 216 in producing businesses in 1998, and in trade and transport 33. In other areas, 81 workers on the social welfare contribution rolls were employed, and 1,732 such workers worked from home. In processing businesses there were two businesses, and in construction 11. Furthermore, in 1999, there were 117 agricultural operations with a working area of 2 674 ha, of which 2 674 ha was cropland and 445 ha was meadowland.

=== Education ===
In 1999, the following institutions existed in Frensdorf:

- 150 kindergarten places with 179 children
- Primary school with 31 teachers and 608 pupils

== Wingersdorf ==
=== History ===
The residential settlement of Wingersdorf is divided into the actual village and an estate, which was first mentioned in 1109 under the name Stöckach, and which until 1950 belonged to the Catholic parish of Herrnsdorf, whereas Wingersdorf belongs to the Catholic parish of Sambach.

Throughout the community, the landlords were the Frensdorf administration, the Bamberg Chapter, the Collegiate Monastery of Saint Jacob at Bamberg, the Michaelsberg and St. Klara Monasteries at Bamberg, the Parish of Hirschaid, the Zollner von Brand, von Schönborn and Löffelholz von Colberg families and the community itself.

==== The Schlösschen ====
The estate, whose history reaches back to 1109, is also known as the Wingersdorfer Schlösschen (“Wingersdorf Little Castle”). Its landlords and owners are known back to 1352. Its heyday began with its sale to the Bamberg book dealer Tobias Göbhardt on 26 October 1778 for 2,800 guilders. Göbhardt, who had also earned his money since 1764 reprinting books and who was therefore known at the Leipzig Trade Fair, held public offices from 1770 onwards, such as police court graduate lawyer and city councillor. He built on the estate's lands in 1778 and 1779 a building that dominated the whole valley.

After his death, the Schlösschen remained in the Göbhardt family's hands until 1799, at which time they sold it to two members of the Winkler von Mohrenfels family. After frequent changes in ownership, the old Göbhardt manor ended up under the Burkard family's ownership.

On New Year's Eve 1995-1996, a firework rocket struck the now empty Schlösschen. The fire that was thus started destroyed the roof truss, with the water from the firehoses also leaving stains. Because straw was being stored on the first floor and there was the danger of the fire's flaring up again from hotspots in the straw, parts of the outer walls had to be torn away so that the straw could more easily be removed. The owner was neither willing nor able to save the burnt ruins, and so the community council gave its consent in 2002 for the Baroque building's demolition.
