= Strullendorf =

- Municipality
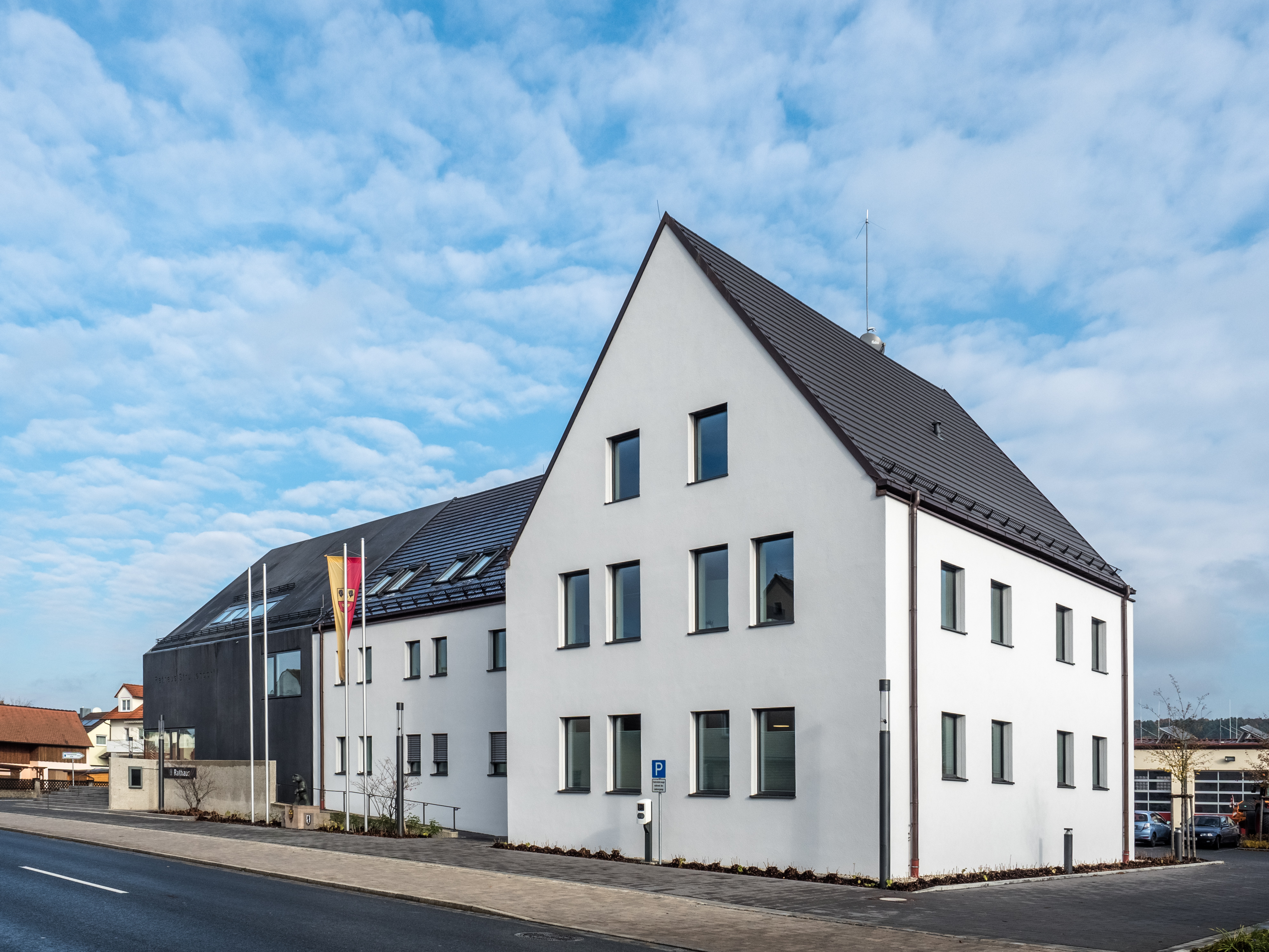
- Town hall

- Coat of arms

- Location of Strullendorf within Bamberg district
- Interactive map of Strullendorf
- Location within Germany Location within Bavaria
- Coordinates: 49°50′N 10°58′E
- Country: Germany
- State: Bavaria
- Admin. region: Oberfranken
- District: Bamberg
- Subdivisions: 8 Gemeindeteile

Government
  - Mayor (2020–26): Wolfgang Desel (CSU)

Area
  - Total: 31.69 km^{2} (12.24 sq mi)
- Elevation: 251 m (823 ft)

Population (2025-12-31)
  - Total: 7,800
  - Density: 250/km^{2} (640/sq mi)
- Time zone: UTC+01:00 (CET)
  - Summer (DST): UTC+02:00 (CEST)
- Postal codes: 96129
- Dialling codes: 09543
- Vehicle registration: BA
- Website: www.strullendorf.de

Strullendorf is a municipality in the Upper Franconian district of Bamberg. It is an ideal place for hiking and cycling tours along with many breweries

== Geography ==
=== Location ===
Strullendorf lies in a valley and is partly surrounded by the Hauptsmoorwald (forest), near which lies the Hauptsmoorhalle (a concert venue). The Hauptsmoorwald stretches all the way to Bamberg and parts of it are used by the US Army stationed there as a training area.

=== Constituent communities ===
Strullendorf's main and namesake centre is by far the biggest of its Gemeindeteile with a population of 4,191. The community furthermore has these outlying centres, each given here with its own population figure:

- Amlingstadt: 678
- Geisfeld: 933
- Leesten: 259
- Mistendorf: 501
- Roßdorf am Forst: 492
- Wernsdorf: 476
- Zeegendorf: 563

The community also has 10 traditional rural land units, known in German as Gemarkungen, named Amlingstadt, Geisfeld, Leesten, Mistendorf, Roßdorf am Forst, Strullendorf, Wernsdorf, Zeegendorf, Geisberger Forst and Hauptsmoor, eight of which (all but the last two, which are wilderness areas) have the same names as eight of the constituent communities (it is traditional for a Gemarkung to be named after a town or village lying nearby).

=== Strullendorf Centre ===
The town of Strullendorf itself lies by the Rhine–Main–Danube Canal. The town of Strullendorf also has a Deutsche Bahn train station in it. The town lies on the Staatsstraße 2244.

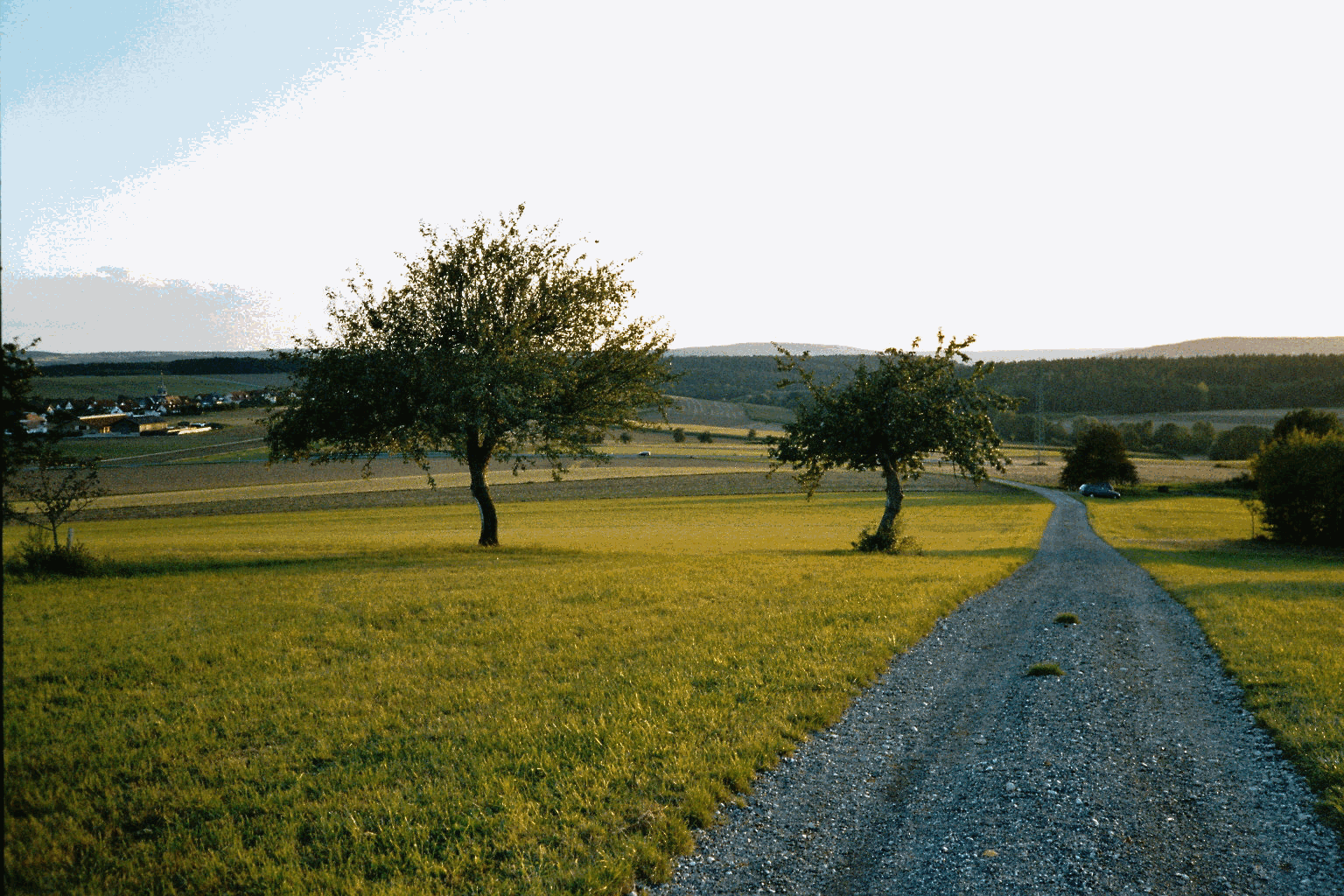
Wernsdorf in the dale at left with a view of the Hauptsmoorwald

== History ==
The Nuremberg patrician family Tockler owned the Tocklerhof in Strullendorf until the 16th century. This, and the Zeidelhuben, used for forest beekeeping and already named by 1348, were of great economic importance for the community. Strullendorf belonged to the High Monastery at Bamberg. Since the Reichsdeputationshauptschluss of 1803, the community has belonged to Bavaria. In the course of administrative reform in Bavaria, today's community came into being under the Gemeindeedikt ("Community Edict") of 1818.

=== Population development ===
Within municipal limits, 5,736 inhabitants were counted in 1970, 6,489 in 1987 and 7,846 in 2000. On 30 June 2007 it was only 7,791 and in 31 December 2024, it went up to 7,828.

== Politics ==
The mayor is Wolfgang Desel (CSU), first elected in 2014 and re-elected in 2020.

The community council is made up of 20 members, listed here by party or voter community affiliation, and also with the number of seats that each holds:

- 10 CSU
- 5 SPD-FWG
- 5 Neue Liste

In 1999, municipal tax revenue, converted to euros, amounted to €4,694,000 of which business taxes (net) amounted to €1,654,000.

Since 2005, Strullendorf has had a youth parliament with a youth mayor. The youth parliament has at its disposal a budget of €1,200 each year.

== Economy and infrastructure ==
According to official statistics, there were 900 workers on the social welfare contribution rolls working in producing businesses, and in trade and transport none. Also, 2,923 such workers worked from home. In processing businesses there were four businesses, and in construction 12. Furthermore, in 1999, there were 96 agricultural operations with a working area of 1 515 ha, of which 1 231 ha was cropland and 279 ha was meadowland.

== Education ==
In 1999, the following institutions existed in Strullendorf:

- 250 kindergarten places with 290 children
- Elementary school with 34 teachers and 627 pupils
