= Hallerndorf =

- Municipality
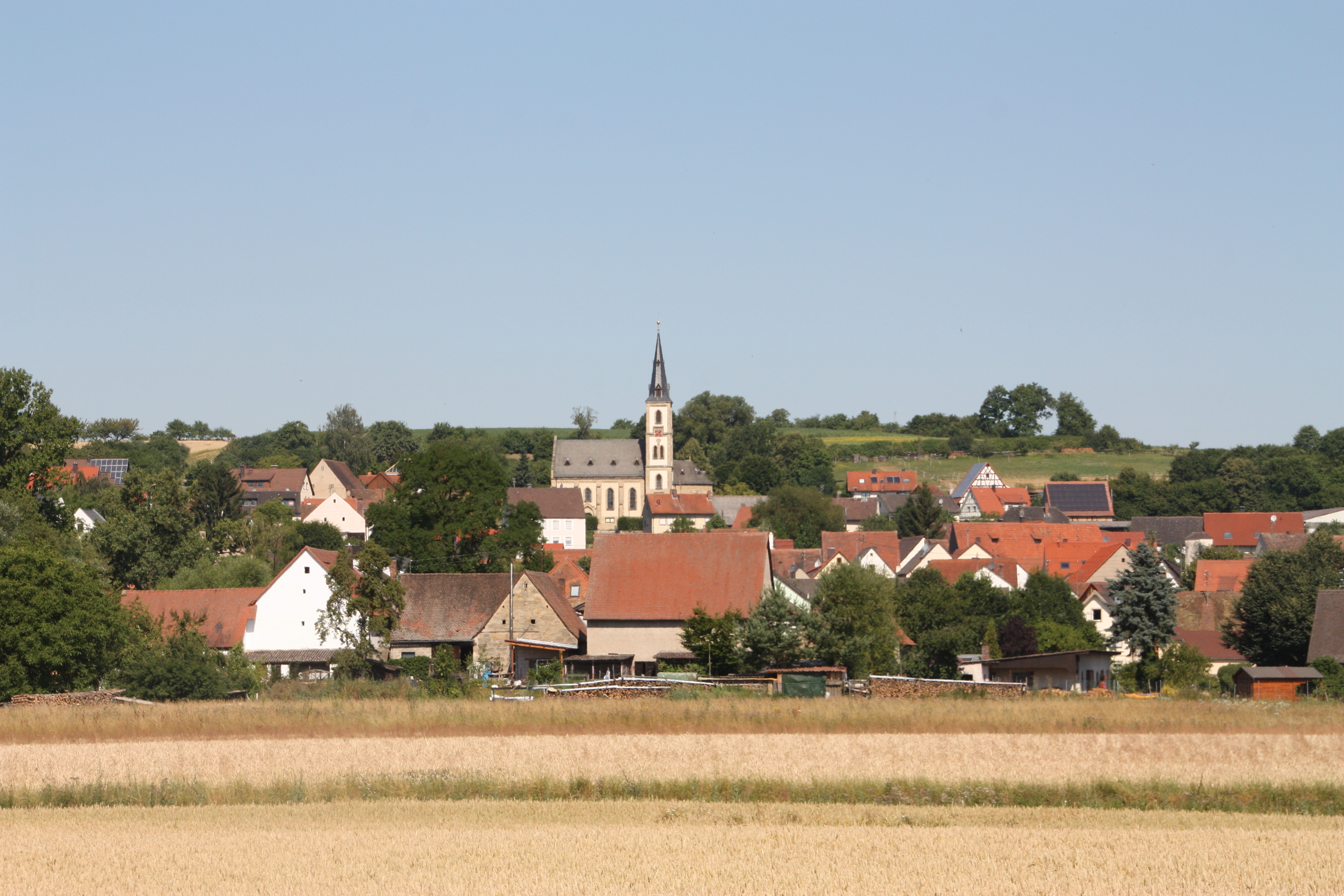
- General view

- Coat of arms

- Location of Hallerndorf within Forchheim district
- Interactive map of Hallerndorf
- Location within Germany Location within Bavaria
- Coordinates: 49°46′N 10°59′E
- Country: Germany
- State: Bavaria
- Admin. region: Oberfranken
- District: Forchheim
- Subdivisions: 7 Ortsteile

Government
  - Mayor (2020–26): Gerhard Bauer

Area
  - Total: 41.31 km^{2} (15.95 sq mi)
- Elevation: 282 m (925 ft)

Population (2025-12-31)
  - Total: 4,162
  - Density: 100.8/km^{2} (260.9/sq mi)
- Time zone: UTC+01:00 (CET)
  - Summer (DST): UTC+02:00 (CEST)
- Postal codes: 91352
- Dialling codes: 09545
- Vehicle registration: FO
- Website: www.hallerndorf.de

Hallerndorf (German pronunciation: [ˈhalɐndɔʁf]) is a municipality in the district of Forchheim in Bavaria in Germany.
