= Burgebrach =

- Municipality
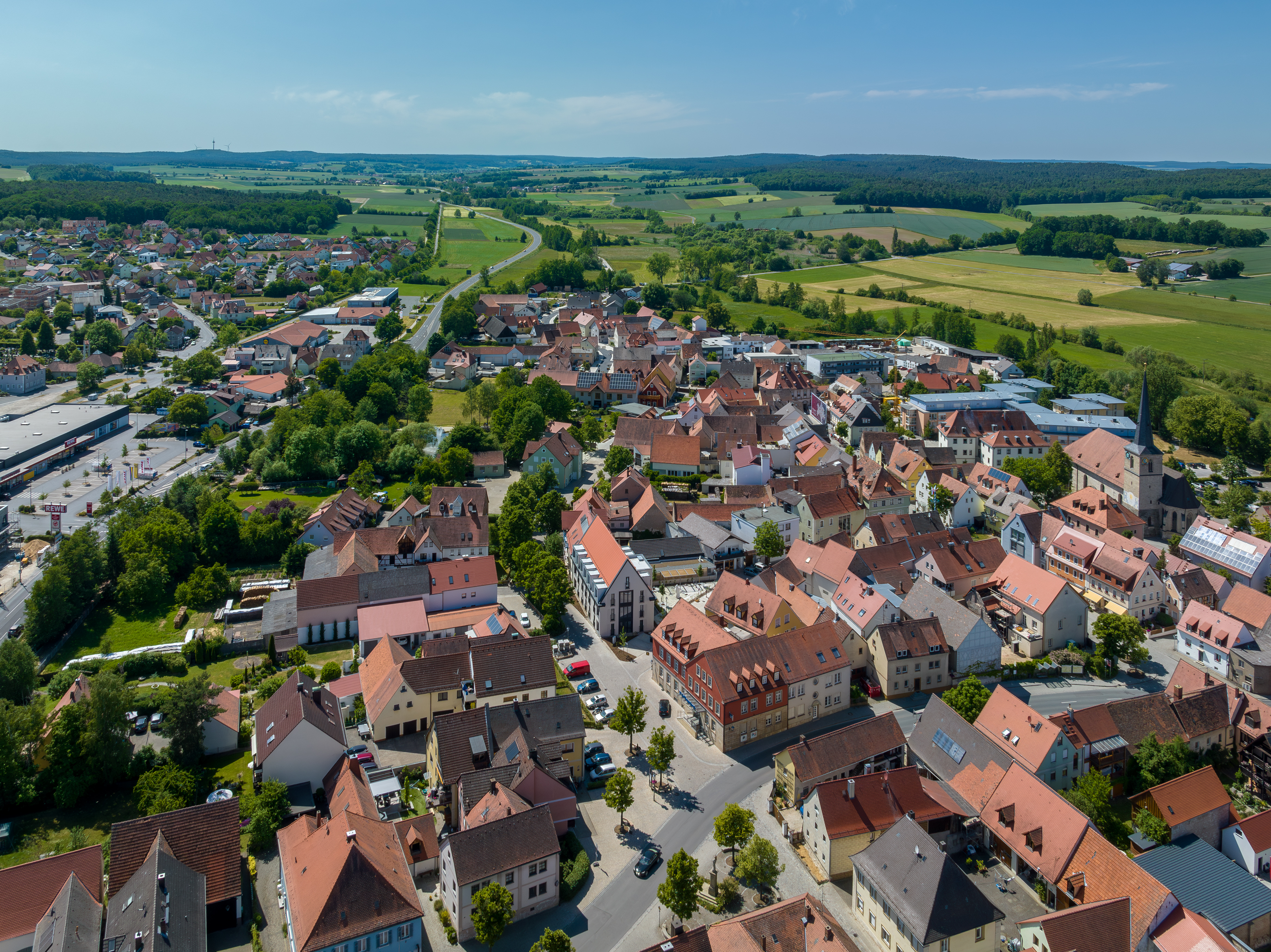
- Aerial view of Burgebrach

- Coat of arms

- Location of Burgebrach within Bamberg district
- Interactive map of Burgebrach
- Location within Germany Location within Bavaria
- Coordinates: 49°49′N 10°45′E
- Country: Germany
- State: Bavaria
- Admin. region: Oberfranken
- District: Bamberg
- Municipal assoc.: Burgebrach
- Subdivisions: 27 Ortsteile

Government
  - Mayor (2020–26): Johannes Maciejonczyk (CSU)

Area
  - Total: 87.84 km^{2} (33.92 sq mi)
- Elevation: 267 m (876 ft)

Population (2025-12-31)
  - Total: 7,180
  - Density: 81.7/km^{2} (212/sq mi)
- Time zone: UTC+01:00 (CET)
  - Summer (DST): UTC+02:00 (CEST)
- Postal codes: 96138
- Dialling codes: 09546
- Vehicle registration: BA
- Website: vg-burgebrach.de

Burgebrach (German pronunciation: [bʊʁkˈʔeːbʁax]; Mainfränkisch: Bägäbrich) is a market town in the Upper Franconian district of Bamberg and the seat of the administrative community (Verwaltungsgemeinschaft) of Burgebrach.

== Geography ==
Burgebrach is said to be the eastern gateway to the Steigerwald (forest), where the Mittlere Ebrach empties into the Rauhe Ebrach. It is to be found on Bundesstraße 22 halfway between Bamberg and Ebrach.

=== Neighbouring communities ===
Lisberg, Stegaurach, Frensdorf, Pommersfelden, Mühlhausen (Erlangen-Höchstadt district), Schlüsselfeld, Burgwindheim, Schönbrunn im Steigerwald and Walsdorf all border on Burgebrach.

=== Constituent communities ===
Burgebrach's main and namesake centre is by far the biggest of its Ortsteile with a population of 3,316. The market town furthermore has these outlying centres, each given here with its own population figure:

- Ampferbach 366
- Büchelberg 77
- Dietendorf 228
- Dippach 79
- Dürrhof 65
- Failshof 22
- Försdorf 12
- Grasmannsdorf 247
- Hirschbrunn 138
- Klemmenhof 27
- Krumbach 31
- Küstersgreuth 39
- Magdalenenkappel 8
- Manndorf 33
- Mönchherrnsdorf 198
- Mönchsambach 102
- Oberharnsbach 301
- Oberköst 219
- Schatzenhof 15
- Stappenbach 365
- Tempelsgreuth 83
- Treppendorf 183
- Unterharnsbach 119
- Unterneuses 238
- Vollmannsdorf 51
- Wolfsbach 106

as of 31 December 2004

== History ==
The first known name for the place was Urbs Ebraha in 1023. Emperor Heinrich II donated it to the Bishopric of Würzburg, which then sold it to the High Monastery at Bamberg. Burgebrach was the original parish for more than 40 outlying places. It was granted market rights on 21 August 1472 by Bamberg Bishop Georg von Schaumburg.

In 1499, on the Bishop's demands, three defensive towers had to be built, for which the Bishop exempted the market town from taxes. Walls were needless, as the boggy meadows and the Ebrach's two arms had long been thwarting enemy attacks. Thus Burgebrach was spared the fury of the Hussite and German Peasants' Wars. Only in 1550 was it beset by the notorious Margrave Albrecht Alkibiades’s, and on 16 February 1632 in the Thirty Years' War by the Swedes’ plundering and pillaging. In 1706, a great deal of money and goods were forced out of the townsfolk by the French.

Since the Reichsdeputationshauptschluss of 1803, the community has no longer belonged to the High Monastery at Bamberg, but rather to Bavaria.

Burgebrach once had Jewish inhabitants who had at their disposal a synagogue and a mikvah. The former has been converted into a home, while the latter, a ritual bath, is used nowadays as a garage. The dead were buried in Walsdorf.

=== Population development ===
Within town limits, 4,761 inhabitants were counted in 1970, 5,037 in 1987, 6,212 in 2000 and 6479 in 2006. In 2007 it was 6,438.

== Politics ==
From 1990 to 2014, the mayor has been Georg Bogensperger (CSU). From 2014 on, the mayor is Johannes Maciejonczyk (CSU).

The town council is made up of 20 members, listed here by party or voter community affiliation, and also with the number of seats that each holds, since the 2020 local elections:

- CSU 7
- Freie Wähler - Überparteiliche Christliche Wählergemeinschaft 3
- Wählergemeinschaft Oberer Grund 3
- Ampferbach-Dietendorfer Liste 2
- Wählergemeinschaft Oberköst-Hirschbrunn-Treppendorf 2
- Christliche Wählergemeinschaft Grasmannsdorf 1
- Christliche Wählergemeinschaft Stappenbach 1
- Wählergemeinschaft Unterneuses 1

In 1999, municipal tax revenue, converted to euros, amounted to €2,610,000 of which business taxes (net) amounted to €776,000.

=== Town partnership ===
There is a partnership arrangement with the community of Kapsweyer in Rhineland-Palatinate.

== Culture and sightseeing ==
=== Buildings ===
- The St. Vitus parish church with Gothic and Baroque elements has been witnessed since 1154. Building work on the tower was begun in the 13th century. On the right side in the choir space stand figures from the Veit Stoss school of those who endowed the Bishopric of Bamberg: Emperor Heinrich and his wife Kunigunde.
- On the church square stands a Mount of Olives group in a hexagonal sandstone housing with rib vaulting, facing tracery and an off-centre cupola.
- The parish house was once the Prince-Bishop’s hunting palace and in 1909 it was remodelled in the Neo-Renaissance style.
- From the town’s fortifications the Upper Gate still remains (gatehouse from 1720), which still houses the town hall today with the administration building built onto it.
- Windeck ruins in Ampferbach
- Former Amt court/district hospital, now a community centre.

=== Wayside shrines ===
- Wayside shrine at the bridge, known as Beichtenmarter or Luthermarter. Outside the former gate fortifications stands today on a lobe of the fairgrounds, field no. 728, the Beichtenmarter ("Confessional Shrine"), and not very much farther is the Galgenberg – the Gallows Mountain.

The local historical inscription from 1958 describes "Hans Leisentritt’s" last minutes: "...The sun was climbing on this last day of September in full brightness high above the Jura. Hans Leisentritt did not see it, nor did he see the blue sky as he faltered through the North Gate. Before the Marter at the brook he knelt down and the sentence was read out once again. ‘Crucified Lord Jesus Christ, have pity with me!’ In holy mercifulness the Lord on the Cross looked upon the poor sinner. A picture of misery of a man stumbled in fetters on towards the gallows. Nobody ran up to cut the ropes off from him so that he could run back into the market town, flee into the church and thereby be saved. None wanted to help him. Thus, he staggered on, up to the gallows. There, the hangman carried out his duty."

The Gothic Marter bears on its octagonal shaft the year 1522 and on the lantern 1512.

The lantern itself is adorned on both front and back by a Crucifixion scene, and on the edges are found Emperor Heinrich and Empress Kunigunde.

On the octagonal shaft, on the side towards the road – when the light is just right – the outlines of a human figure can be made out. At this wayside shrine, it is believed that Martin Luther preached on his way to Heidelberg, leading some to believe that the shape that could be seen on the shaft was Martin Luther's, thereby also leading others to batter the image with stones into unrecognizability. Whatever the truth is about this story, it cannot be confirmed that Martin Luther ever came to Burgebrach.

On 8 June 1968, Alfred Seel noted this 220-cm tall memorial with its 60-cm wide lantern in his description of field memorials in the City and District of Bamberg. In 1976, Hanns Leitherer strengthened and restored the memorial and the municipality laid a sandstone plaque at the foot of the shrine bearing both names.

- Wayside shrine on the heights, known as Ursula-Marter or Otto-Marter . This wayside shrine standing at field no. 401 is particularly worthy of mention, as it can be used as an outdoor altar. The Baroque 280-cm tall shrine was, according to the inscription on the back, made in 1703; the initials above – J. G. H. and M. C. H. – may refer to those who endowed the shrine. The lantern shows the following pictures: on the side towards the road (east side) is a representation of the Trinity; on the back (west side) is an image of Saint George fighting the dragon; the side towards Burgebrach (south side) was adorned with Saint John of Nepomuk; the side towards Ampferbach (north side) was adorned with Saint Catherine. Fruit hangers decorate the lantern and post. The acanthus that caps the images forms the base on the lantern for the crowning cross which was removed at some unknown time. The lantern and post have the same dimensions (50 × 30 cm).

The inscription "Ren. 1811" points to a renovation. The last restoration – in the 20th century – was financed by the Heimatverein Burgebrach ("homeland club").

Two legends, although neither one's provenance can be confirmed, are connected with this place:

1. When the newly chosen Bamberg Bishop, coming from Würzburg reached here on 1 February 1203, a delegation from Bamberg was already waiting to greet the new landlord.
2. Ursula von Windeck (14th century) was driving to Burgebrach for church services on Trinity Sunday (the first Sunday after Whitsun) with a team of horses. As the coach coming from the castle turned into the main road, the firecrackers were set off in Burgebrach; the horses shied. Ursula sent an ejaculatory prayer to the Holy Trinity and the approaching misfortune was averted. Ursula thereupon endowed a wayside shrine.

In the front relief described as a representation of the Trinity, one does not see the usual representation of an at once glorious and dolorous Trinity, but rather God the Father gazes out from the clouds with outstretched arms, the dove, symbol of the Holy Ghost, sweeps across the middle of the relief over the Christ Child, who is being led by Mary and Joseph.

=== Regular events ===
- The church consecration festival (Kirchweih, or locally, Kerwa), known well beyond the community, takes place yearly on the Sunday after Michaelmas (29 September), so on the last weekend in September or the first in October.
- Every three months – quarterly, on the second Sunday in March, June, September and December – markets are held in Burgebrach, which are well patronized.

=== Events ===
- 1000 Jahre Burgebrach was celebrated in June 2023. burgebrach2023.de

== Economy and infrastructure ==
Burgebrach is a subcentre and has its own hospital, the Steigerwaldklinik. Moreover, there are many retail businesses in Burgebrach. The firm Ideal Automotive and the Musikhaus Thomann with worldwide online mail order further enhance the economy.

=== Transport ===
Through Burgebrach run Staatsstraße 2262 and Bundesstraße 22. The town may be reached by Autobahn through the Schlüsselfeld or Pommersfelden interchange on the A 3.

== Famous people ==
=== Sons and daughters of the town ===
- Thomas Schmauser: After his training at the Otto-Falckenberg-Schule in Munich, this artist, born in 1972, went into a firm engagement at the Lower Saxony State Theatre (Niedersächsisches Staatstheater), where he played many lead rôles onstage. With artistic director Ulrich Khuon he changed in the summer of 2000 to the Hamburger Thalia Theater, where he can be seen as, among others, Prinz Friedrich von Homburg. In the mid-1990s began his film career. He was seen in, among other films, Japaner sind die besseren Liebhaber (1994), Nach fünf im Urwald (1995), Ein todsicheres Geschäft (1999) and Die Einsamkeit der Krokodile (2000). For television, Nur für eine Nacht (1997), Ein Dorf sucht seinen Mörder, Und die Braut wusste von nichts (both 2002) Der Mörder ist unter uns (2003) and the three Tatort productions Der Prügelknabe, Die Liebe und ihr Preis and Teufelskreis were produced. In 1998, he was awarded the O. E.-Hasse-Förderpreis by the Berlin Academy of Arts (Akademie der Künste Berlin).

== Other ==
- Where St. Vitus's parish church now stands, a magnificent and much bigger church was to have been built according to building master Balthasar Neumann’s plans. The Abbot of Ebrach, however, objected to the project, and so the church was never built.
- In the outlying centre of Treppendorf is found Europe's biggest music retailer, Thomann.
- From 1999 to 2005 the label Musico Records was a part of Burgebrach.
