= Walsdorf =

Walsdorf refers to the following places in Germany:

- Walsdorf, Bavaria
- Walsdorf, Hesse, is now part of Idstein
- Walsdorf, Rhineland-Palatinate
