= Maria Aloysia Löwenfels =

German religious sister (1915–1942)

Servant of God Maria Aloysia Löwenfels PHJC
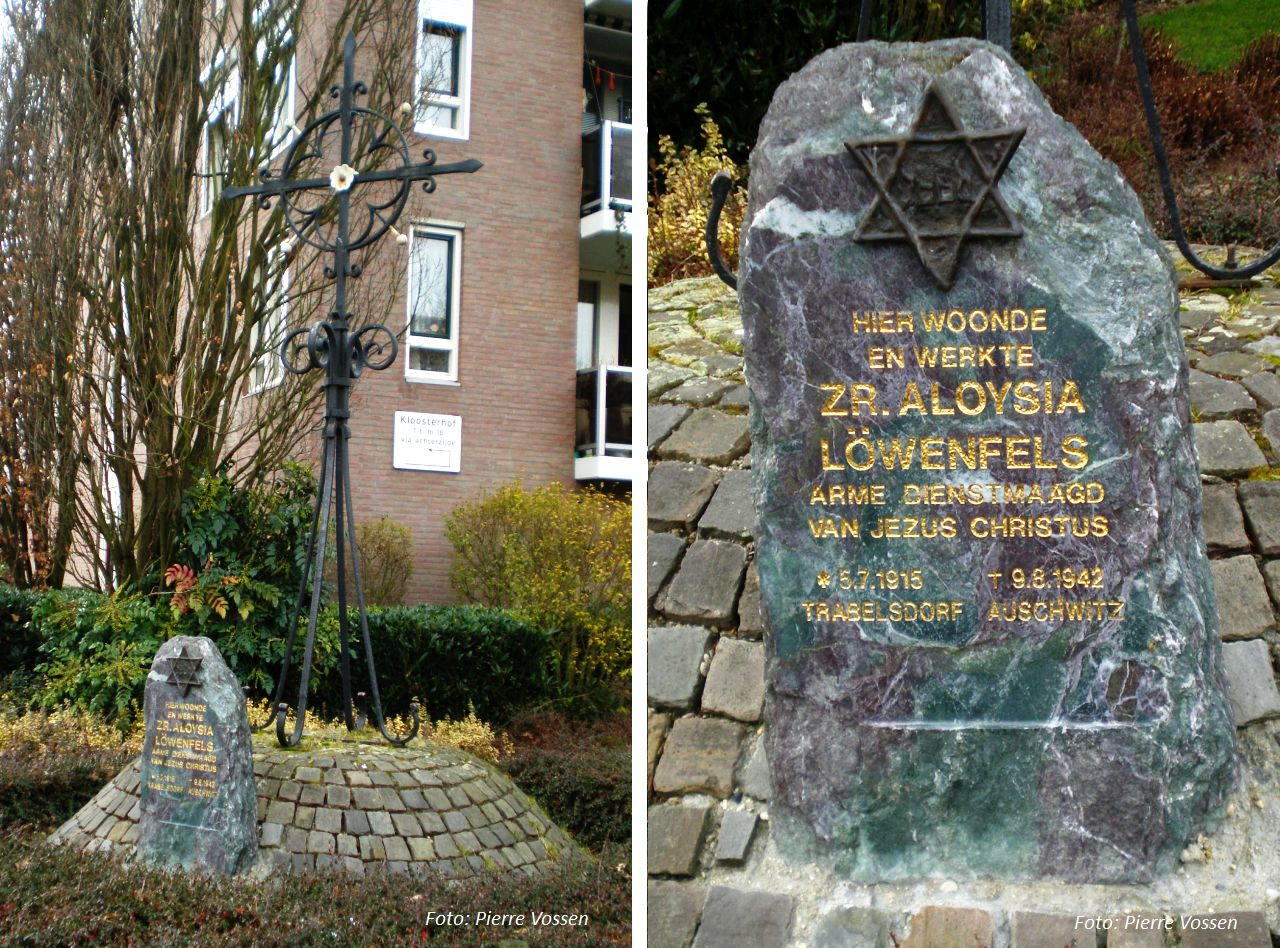
- Monument for Maria Aloysia Löwenfels at the location of the former convent
- Born: Luise Löwenfels; 5 July 1915; Trabelsdorf, Kingdom of Bavaria, German Empire
- Died: 9 August 1942; Auschwitz-Birkenau, Upper Silesia, Nazi Germany

Maria Aloysia Löwenfels PHJC, (July 1915 – 9 August 1942) was a German religious sister. She converted from Judaism to Catholicism. In 1936, she fled to the convent of the Poor Handmaids of Jesus Christ in Lutterade, Netherlands. In 1938, she was confirmed as a novice. On 9 August 1942, she was murdered in the gas chambers of concentration camp Auschwitz-Birkenau. In 2015, the Roman Catholic Diocese of Limburg announced that a beatification process had been started.

== Biography ==
Löwenfels was born on 5 July 1915 in Trabelsdorf, Bavaria, Germany as Luise Löwenfels in a Jewish family. She went to high school at the Gnadenthal monastery in Bavaria, where she became attracted to the Roman Catholic Church. On 25 November 1935, Löwenfels was baptised in the convent of the Poor Handmaids of Jesus Christ in Mönchengladbach against the wishes of her family. She started to work as a teacher.

Löwenfels had been planning an escape to Great Britain. In 1936, one of the children accused her of being Jewish, and threatened to expose her to the Gestapo. Löwenfels fled the next morning to Geleen in the Netherlands. In Lutterade near Geleen, there was a convent of the Poor Handmaids which was founded by German sisters who had fled Germany in 1875 during the Kulturkampf. Löwenfels joined the convent, learned Dutch and started to work as a kindergarten teacher. On 17 September 1938, Löwenfels was confirmed by the Bishop of Roermond as a novice and given the religious name Maria Aloysia.

Nazi Germany invaded the Netherlands on 10 May 1940. Löwenfels was contacted by her brother that the family was trying to escape to the United States, however, she decided to remain. In 1942, she was ordered to wear the Star of David. In February 1942, there was an audience of the religious leaders of the Netherlands with Reichskommissar Seyss-Inquart during which the anti-Semitic policies were condemned. On 20 July 1942, Johannes de Jong, the Archbishop of Utrecht, issued a pastoral letter to be read in all churches, protesting against the deportation of the Jews. In response, 244 former Jews who had converted to the Roman Catholic Church were arrested by the Gestapo on August 2, 1942 and taken via the Amersfoort transit camp to the Westerbork transit camp and finally to the Auschwitz extermination camp.

On 2 August 1942, Löwenfels was arrested, and transported to Westerbork transit camp where she arrived on 4 August. On 7 August, she was sent to concentration camp Auschwitz-Birkenau together with 987 other people. On 9 August, she was murdered in the gas chamber. Among the Catholic Jews was also the Discalced Carmelite Teresa Benedicta of the Cross (Edith Stein), who had also fled to the Netherlands.

== Aftermath ==
The convent in Lutterade was torn down. In 2006, a monument was placed in remembrance of Löwenfels at the location of the convent. Her brother managed to escape to the United States.

In 2015, the apostolic administrator of the Diocese of Limburg announced that a beatification process had been opened for Sister Maria Aloysia. The postulator is Christiane Humpert PHJC. The investigation has focused on whether Löwenfels died as a martyr.
