= Hughes & Kettner =

German music supply manufacturer

- Type: Private
- Industry: Amplification
- Founded: Neunkirchen, Germany (1984; 42 years ago)
- Founder: Hans and Lothar Stamer (CEO)
- Headquarters: St. Wendel, Germany
- Area served: Europe, Africa, Asia, North America, South America, Australia
- Key people: Hans and Lothar Stamer
- Products: Amplifiers
- Parent: Musikhaus Thomann
- Website: hughes-and-kettner.com

Hughes & Kettner is a German manufacturer of instrument amplifiers, cabinets and effects boxes.

== History ==
The company was founded in Neunkirchen in 1984 by two brothers, Hans and Lothar Stamer, and moved to St. Wendel three years later.

It is cited as having a "long and good standing reputation as a maker of solidly performing tube amplifiers".

In 1989, Hughes & Kettner offered the first realistic speaker emulation device, the Red Box, providing the sound of a speaker without needing a microphone. In 1997, the company designed the Rotosphere, a tube-powered effects pedal simulating the sound of a rotary cabinet, similar to a Leslie, but in a much smaller form factor. It has been used by guitar players but also by some keyboard players, such as Jon Lord. In 2011, Music Radar named the Rotosphere as one of the best modulation and filter pedals of all time.

The company is actively producing new models, both tube and solid-state amplifiers. In 2020, the company released the 50W Spirit Nano amplifier head, which combines a transistor amplifier with a Red Box Leslie simulator. The era 1 and era 2 are general purpose amplifiers that are suitable for acoustic guitars and microphones.

In May 2025, the company was acquired by Musikhaus Thomann.

== Notable users ==
Notable users of Hughes & Kettner products include Rush's Alex Lifeson and Kiss' Tommy Thayer, who have signature amplifiers by the company (The TriAmp MKII Alex Lifeson and the Duotone Tommy Thayer). Marillion's Steve Rothery is a longtime user of the Rotosphere and prefers it to other Leslie simulators.

Other Hughes and Kettner users are Joel Stroetzel who has used the company's Rotosphere, Adam Dutkiewicz, Joe Bonamassa, Peredur ap Gwynedd who uses a GrandMeister 36, Nuno Bettencourt, Tony Macalpine, Michael Wilton, Allan Holdsworth and Teo (Evil Teo) Ferlin.

Hughes & Kettner made a custom rig of steampunk styled guitar amplifiers for Rush's Time Machine Tour in 2010.
