= Walsdorf, Bavaria =

Walsdorf
- Municipality
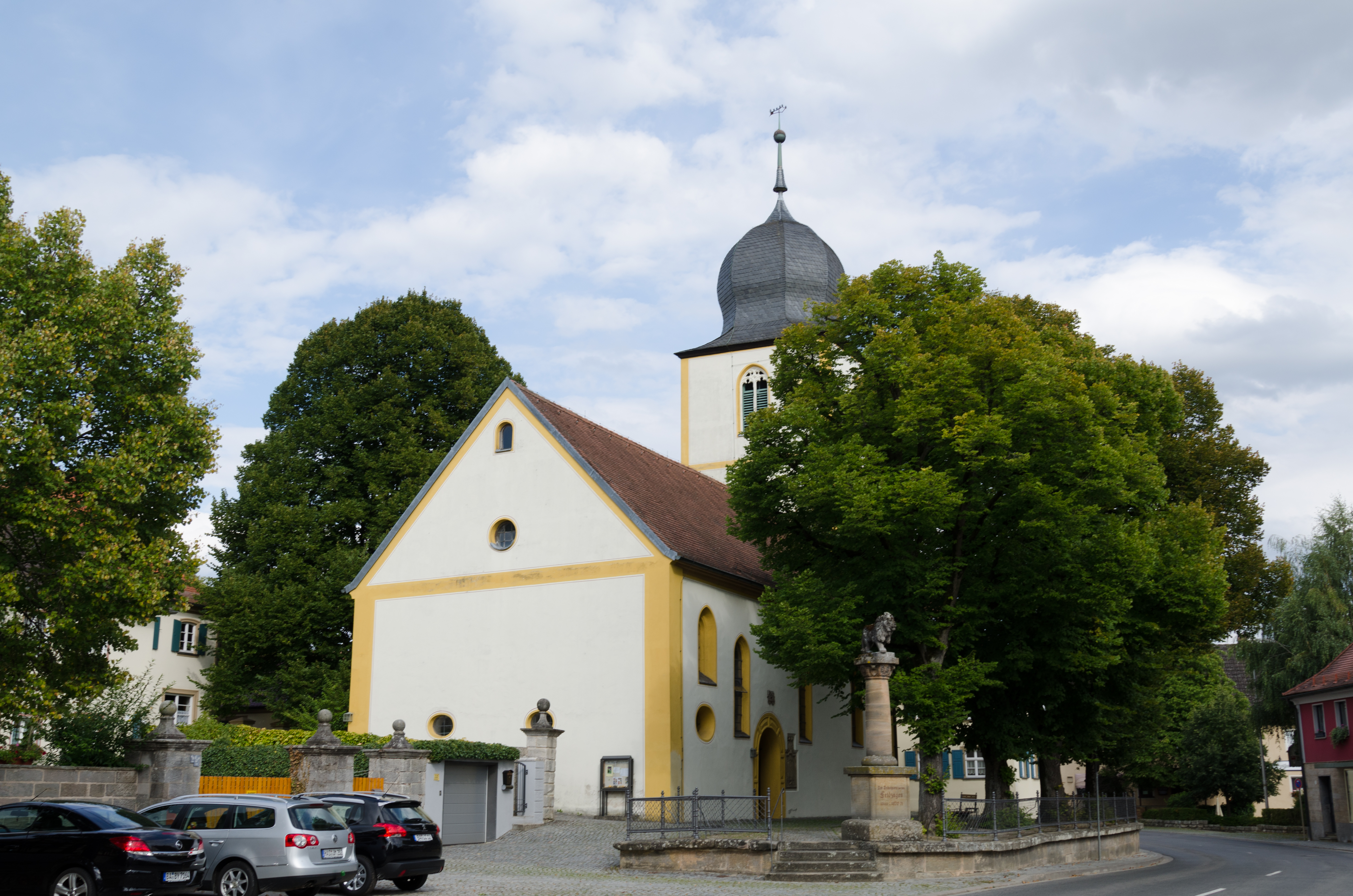
- Lutheran church

- Coat of arms

- Location of Walsdorf within Bamberg district
- Interactive map of Walsdorf
- Location within Germany Location within Bavaria
- Coordinates: 49°52′N 10°47′E
- Country: Germany
- State: Bavaria
- Admin. region: Oberfranken
- District: Bamberg
- Subdivisions: 6 Ortsteile

Government
  - Mayor (2020–26): Mario Wolff

Area
  - Total: 16.24 km^{2} (6.27 sq mi)
- Elevation: 273–329 m (896–1,079 ft)

Population (2025-12-31)
  - Total: 2,633
  - Density: 162.1/km^{2} (419.9/sq mi)
- Time zone: UTC+01:00 (CET)
  - Summer (DST): UTC+02:00 (CEST)
- Postal codes: 96194
- Dialling codes: 09549
- Vehicle registration: BA
- Website: www.walsdorf.de

Walsdorf (German pronunciation: [ˈvalsˌdɔʁf]) is a municipality in the Upper Franconian district of Bamberg. It lies in the valley of the Aurach roughly ten kilometres west of Bamberg.

== Geography ==
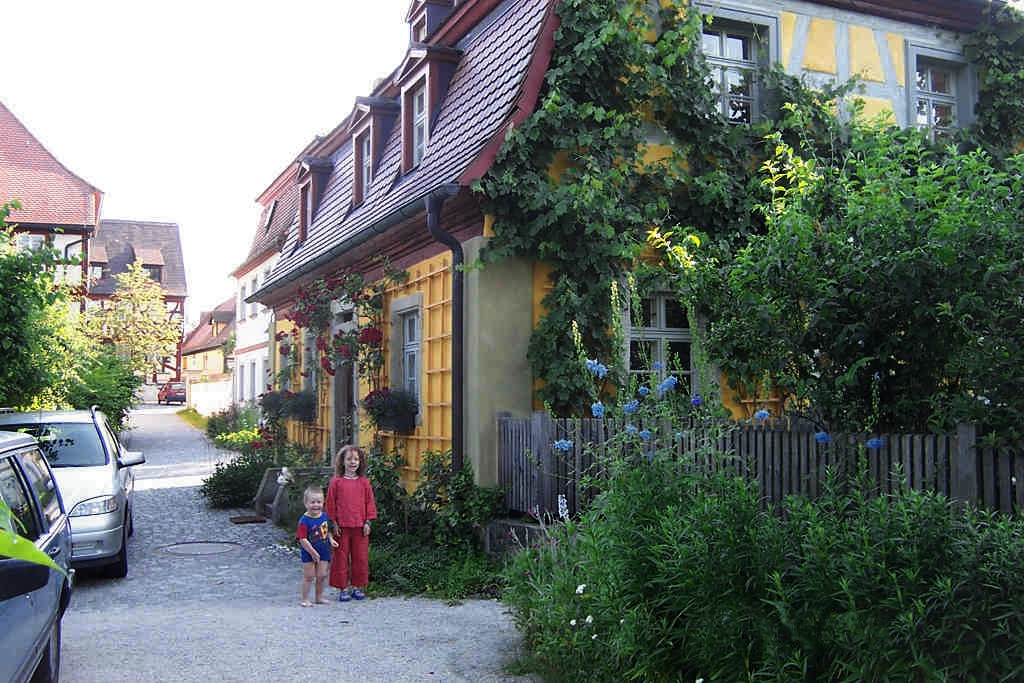
Lane in Walsdorf

=== Constituent communities ===
Walsdorf’s main and namesake centre is by far the biggest of its Gemeindeteile with a population of 1,811. The community furthermore has these outlying centres, each given here with its own population figure:

- Erlau (Franconia) 512
- Feigendorf 73
- Hetzentännig 6
- Kolmsdorf 272
- Zettelsdorf 15

(as of 2006)

== History ==
Walsdorf had its first documentoary mention in Würzburg’s oldest book of enfeoffments, for the year 1317. It is entered there along with the whole circle of surrounding places as bambergisches Lehen der Leutersheim von Lisberg (“Bamberg fief of the Leutersheims of Lisberg”). Changing lordly masters in the years that followed determined the community’s fate, whereby its location in the border areas between the Bishopric of Bamberg and the Bishopric of Würzburg allowed it a certain freedom in its own development. As a Bamberg fief under the ownership of the Leutersheims at Lisberg, ownership passed to the Lords of Thüngfeld in 1399 and then in 1524 to Wolf von Krewelsheim (= Crailsheim). Particularly formative effects were wrought beginning in 1525 by the Crailsheims’ overlordship. They determined the community’s religious allegiance, the community structure and the community’s prosperity, turning it into a wealthy market community in the northern Steigerwald (forest). The landowner was an adherent of the Reformation and belonged to Martin Luther’s watch as he made his way to Worms. As a result, the subjects, too, had to embrace the Evangelical faith, which, however, led to decades-long quarrels with the Bishopric of Bamberg and for a time to confiscation of all lands. This also made it necessary to hold Evangelical church services in part at the castle then belonging to the Lord.

The events in those days have had their effect down to today, and even now, the proportion of Walsdorf’s population who follow the Evangelical faith is far greater – almost 40% – than in the Catholic communities elsewhere in the district.

The autonomous knightly estate of the Barons of Crailsheim passed with the Act of the Confederation of the Rhine in 1806 to Bavaria. These lords, however, remained the local landowners until their overlordship was finally dissolved in 1848, and also remained the patron lords until the patronage, too, was dissolved in 1964.

With effect from 1 July 1971, the formerly autonomous community of Kolmsdorf (with the outlying centres of Feigendorf und Zettelsdorf) freely chose to amalgamate itself with Walsdorf. The community of Erlau followed on 1 May 1978. Also on that day, Walsdorf and the neighbouring communities of Stegaurach, Lisberg (with Trabelsdorf) and Priesendorf formed an administrative community (Verwaltungsgemeinschaft), from which the two last-named communities withdrew again on 31 December 1979. Since 1 January 1980, Stegaurach and Walsdorf have been the only two member communities of the Verwaltungsgemeinschaft of Stegaurach, which was disbanded in January 2013.

It should also be mentioned that throughout the aforesaid overlordship, there was an important Jewish presence in the community, made up mainly of livestock dealers and small businessmen. An autonomous, formerly Jewish Ortsteil lay in the southwest of the main centre with a great Jewish cemetery, to which Bamberg Jews on various occasions had to come to bury their dead for want of their own cemetery in Bamberg. For the time from 1812 to 1848, a book of the dead has been published and is on hand. A modest synagogue, now beset by further building, in the south of the old lordly seat still bears witness today to this small Jewish community.

=== Population development ===
Within municipal limits, 1,412 inhabitants were counted in 1970, 1,695 in 1987 and 2,461 in 2000. In 2007 it was 2,601.

== Politics ==
The mayor is Mario Wolff (Freie Liste), elected in 2020.

The community council is made up of 14 members, listed here by party or voter community affiliation, and also with the number of seats that each holds:

- Freie Liste 6
- CSU 5
- SPD 2
- Zukunft 1

In 1999, municipal tax revenue, converted to euros, amounted to €1,249,000 of which business taxes (net) amounted to €561,000.

== Economy and infrastructure ==
According to official statistics, there were 284 workers on the social welfare contribution rolls working in producing businesses, and in trade and transport none. Also, 880 such workers worked from home. In processing businesses there were twelve businesses, and in construction 2. Furthermore, in 1999, there were 35 agricultural operations with a working area of 9.61 km², of which 7 km² was cropland and 2.6 km² was meadowland.

== Education ==
In 1999, the following institutions existed in Walsdorf:

- 100 kindergarten places with 99 children
- Elementary school with 12 teachers and 216 pupils
