= Thomann (retailer) =

German retailer of musical instruments and audio equipment

Thomann GmbH

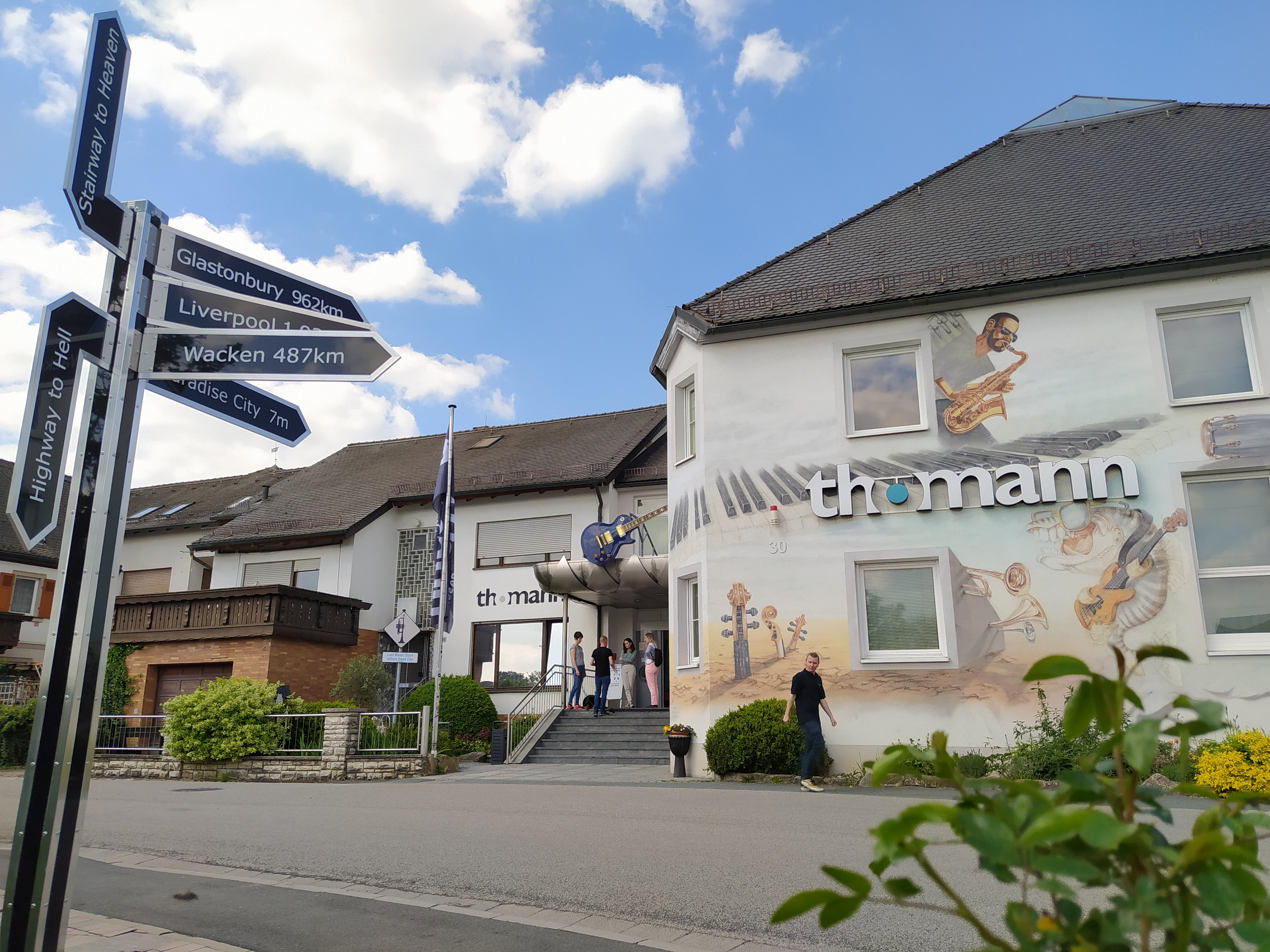
- Thomann Music Store Main Entrance
- Type: GmbH
- Industry: Musical Instruments
- Founded: January 2, 1954; 72 years ago in Burgebrach, Germany
- Founder: Hans Thomann Sr.
- Headquarters: Burgebrach, Germany
- Key people: Hans Thomann Jr. (CEO)
- Products: Musical instruments, Recording equipment, stagelights and accessories
- Revenue: € 1.31 Mrd ($ 1.39B) (2022)
- Owner: family-owned
- Number of employees: 1700 (2021)
- Website: thomannmusic.com

Thomann GmbH, formerly Musikhaus Thomann e.K., is a German-based retailer of musical instruments, studio, lighting, and pro audio equipment, best known primarily due to its large online retail operation, Thomann Cyberstore. According to a 2014 report, it is the largest online retailer in this field. Hans Thomann Sr., founded the company in 1954 as a family business in the community of Treppendorf of Burgebrach, in Bavaria, Germany, where it is still based. The company is still family-owned.

== History ==
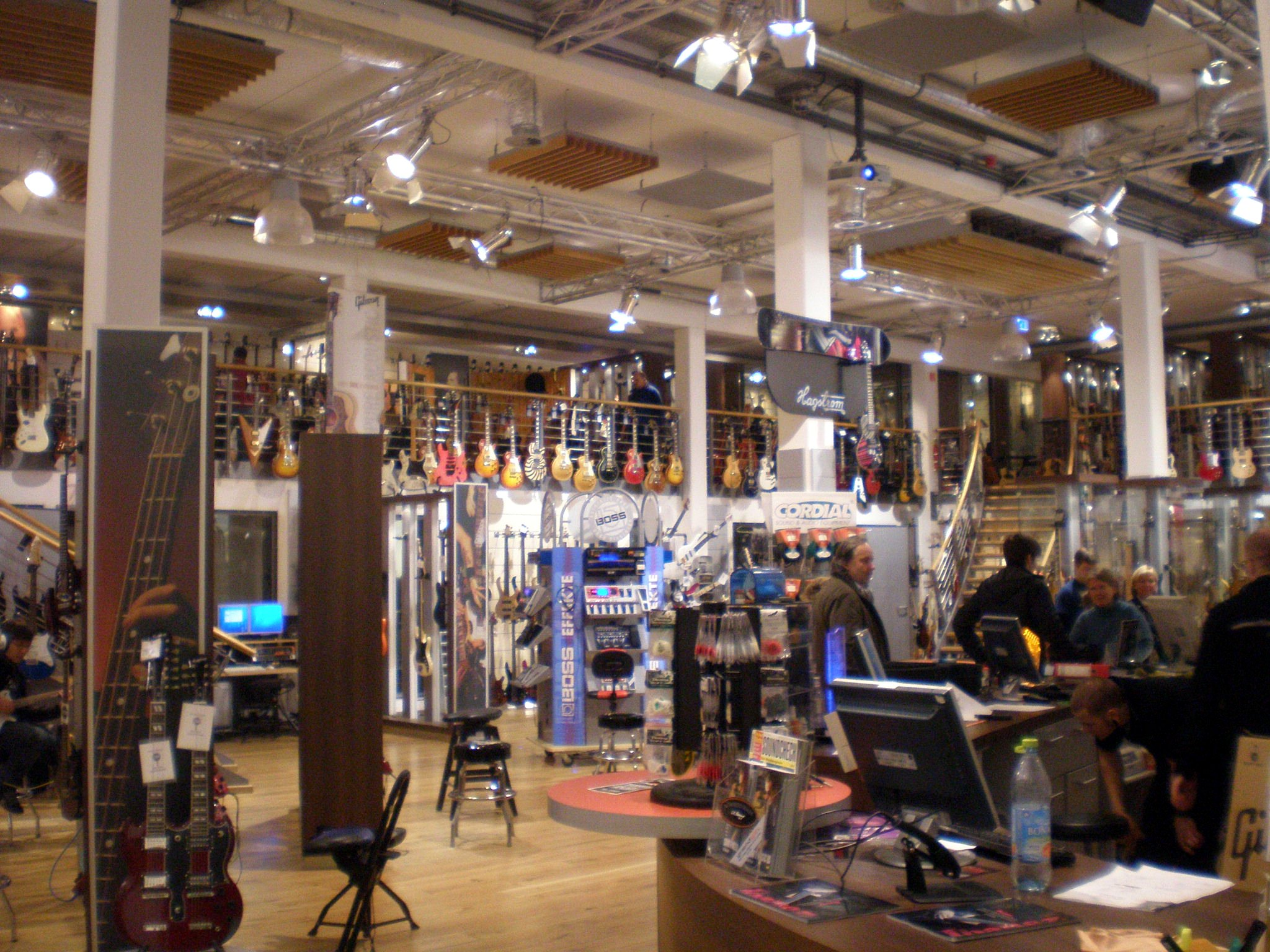
The guitar department at Musikhaus Thomann

Hans Thomann Sr., a trumpet player, recognized that there was no music store near Burgebrach, so he started selling wind instruments, eventually turning part of his family home into a music store in 1954. In 1968, a new wing was built on the home to house the store and its expansion into other product categories. In the 1980s, the company expanded into mail order sales.

In 1990, Hans Thomann Jr. began managing Musikhaus Thomann. In 1996, the company established a website, and began selling products online the following year, with sales of DM 800,000 in 1997.

Musikhaus Thomann is divided into three business units:

1. Musikhaus Thomann – music store, warehouse, and logistics-center
2. Thomann Direktversand and Thomann Cyberstore – distribution unit with about 3.1m customers and the thomann.de online platform; and
3. Thomann Audio Professionell – installation unit for major projects serving theaters, stadiums and other venues

Between 2004 and 2012, the number of customers nearly tripled, slightly exceeding 3 million.

In 2004, the company achieved a turnover of EUR 10m.

In 2006, the company disclosed a turnover of EUR 129m, making it one of the fifty fastest-growing companies in Bavaria once more.

In September 2010, Musikhaus Thomann received the Versender des Jahres (Mail Order Business of the Year) Award from the German Association of Mail Order Companies. The panel of judges chose Musikhaus Thomann for its strong growth, commitment to innovation, and high level of customer satisfaction.

In 2011, Musikhaus Thomann was presented with the Global E-Commerce Award (Gold) at the Global E-Commerce Summit in Barcelona. Eight national winners competed for the European prize. Thomann was the German nominee, having won the 2010 Mail Order Business of the Year Award. The jury noted that Thomann had demonstrated "the ability to tap into a market segment that a few years ago nobody believed could be served through internet retail".

In 2022, Thomann GmbH achieved a turnover of around € 1.31 billion euros.

In 2025, Thomann acquired German-based amplifier manufacturer Hughes & Kettner.

On 22 June 2026, Thomann announced retaliatory legal action in response to Fender's Stratocaster copyright campaign.

== Store-brands ==
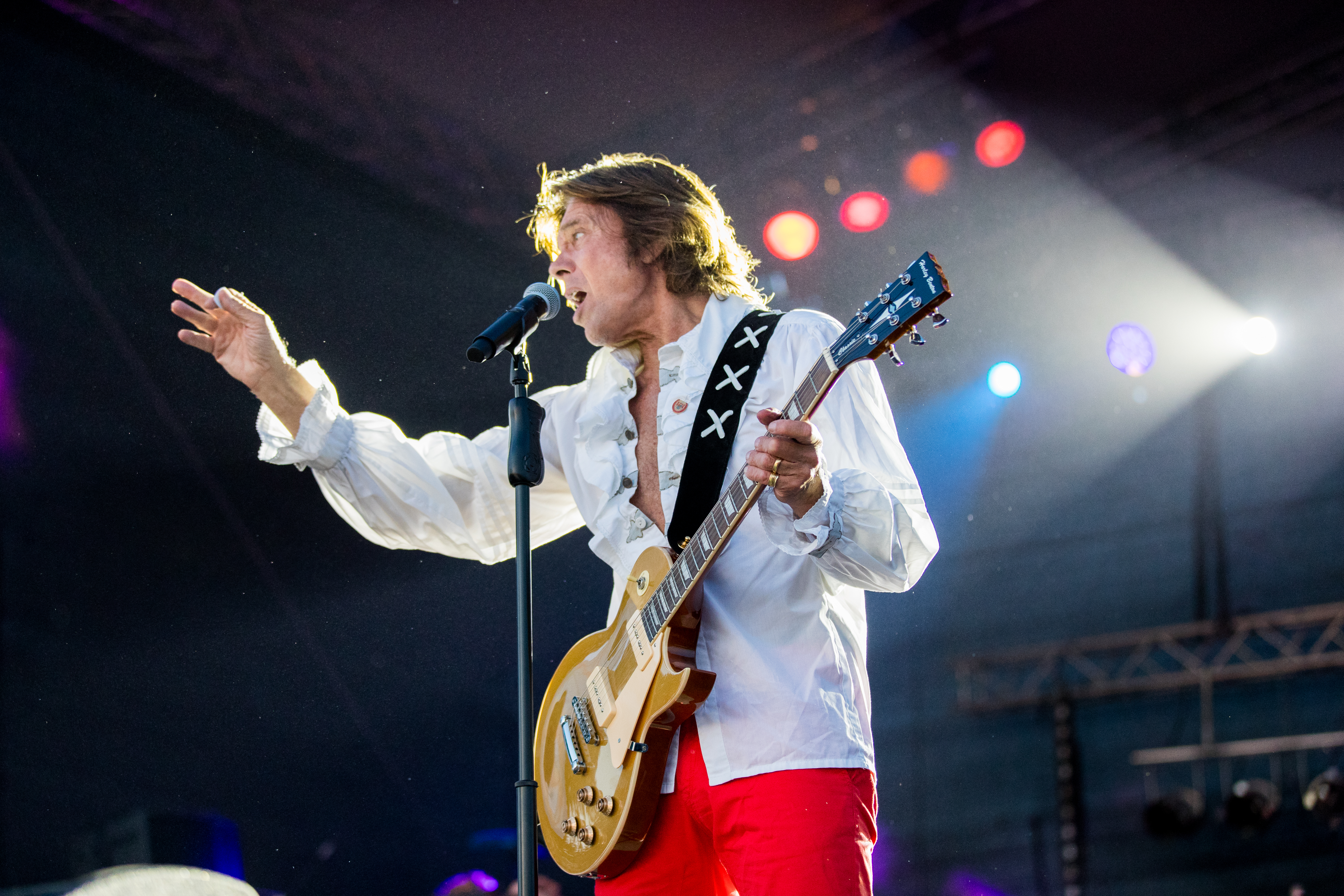
Jürgen Drews playing a Harley Benton brand guitar in 2016

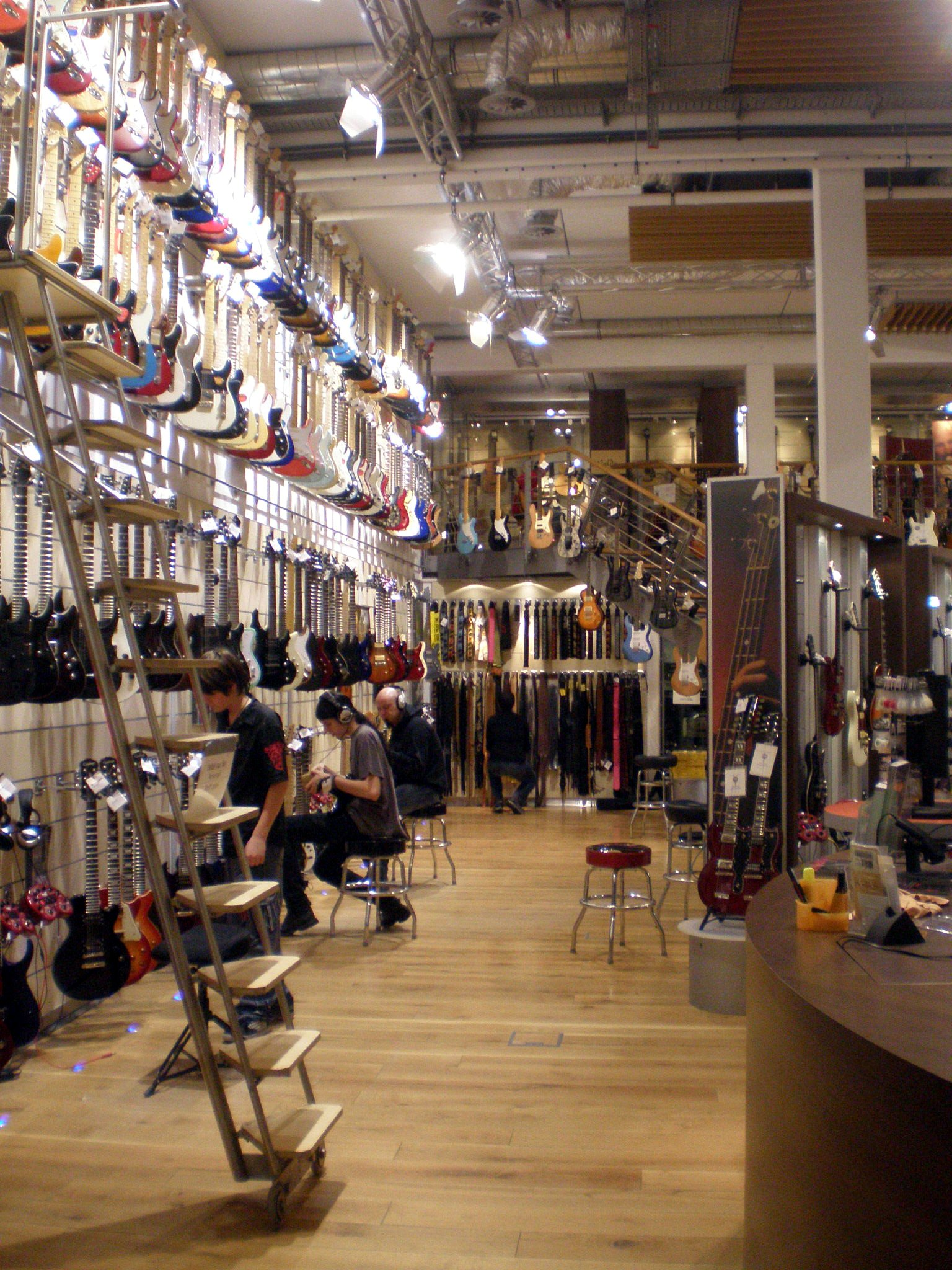
The "Great Wall" in the guitar department

Thomann sells several store brands, including:

- Harley Benton (plucked and string instruments, accessories, guitar and bass amplifiers, effect pedals)
- Fun Generation (lightning effects)
- Startone (wind instruments, brass instruments, accordions, guitars, music stands)
- Lead Foot (foot switches)
- Millenium (drum sets, percussion, stands)
- Roth & Junius (bowed string instruments, grand pianos)
- Stairville (lighting effects)
  - a rough literal English translation of "Treppendorf"
- Swissonic (audio recorders, studio amplification, MIDI keyboards)
- the box, the box pro (PA loudspeakers)
- the sssnake, pro snake (cables, leads)
- the t.akustik (acoustic damping and absorption material)
- the t.amp (PA amplification)
- the t.mix (powered mixers, accessories)
- the t.meter (studio meters, indicators)
- the t.bone (microphones, headphones)
  - As part of the t.bone brand, Thomann distributes a wide range of microphones from the two largest producers in China
- the t.racks (rack equipment, accessories)
- Thomann (various products)
- Thon (flight cases, hard cases, racks)
- Hughes & Kettner (guitar amps)
