= Burgebrach (Verwaltungsgemeinschaft) =

- Verwaltungsgemeinschaft
- Location of Burgebrach within Bamberg district
- Interactive map of Burgebrach
- Location within Germany Location within Bavaria
- Coordinates: 49°50′N 10°45′E
- Country: Germany
- State: Bavaria
- Admin. region: Upper Franconia
- District: Bamberg
- Seat: Burgebrach
- Subdivisions: 2 municipalities

Area
  - Total: 112.54 km^{2} (43.45 sq mi)

Population (2025-12-31)
  - Total: 9,083
  - Density: 80.71/km^{2} (209.0/sq mi)
- Time zone: UTC+01:00 (CET)
  - Summer (DST): UTC+02:00 (CEST)
- Website: www.vg-burgebrach.de

Baunach is a Verwaltungsgemeinschaft (municipal association) in the district of Bamberg in Bavaria, Germany. Its seat is in Burgebrach. It consists of the following municipalities:

1. Burgebrach
2. Schönbrunn im Steigerwald
