= Harley Benton =

Instrument brand

- Industry: Musical instruments
- Website: https://harleybenton.com/

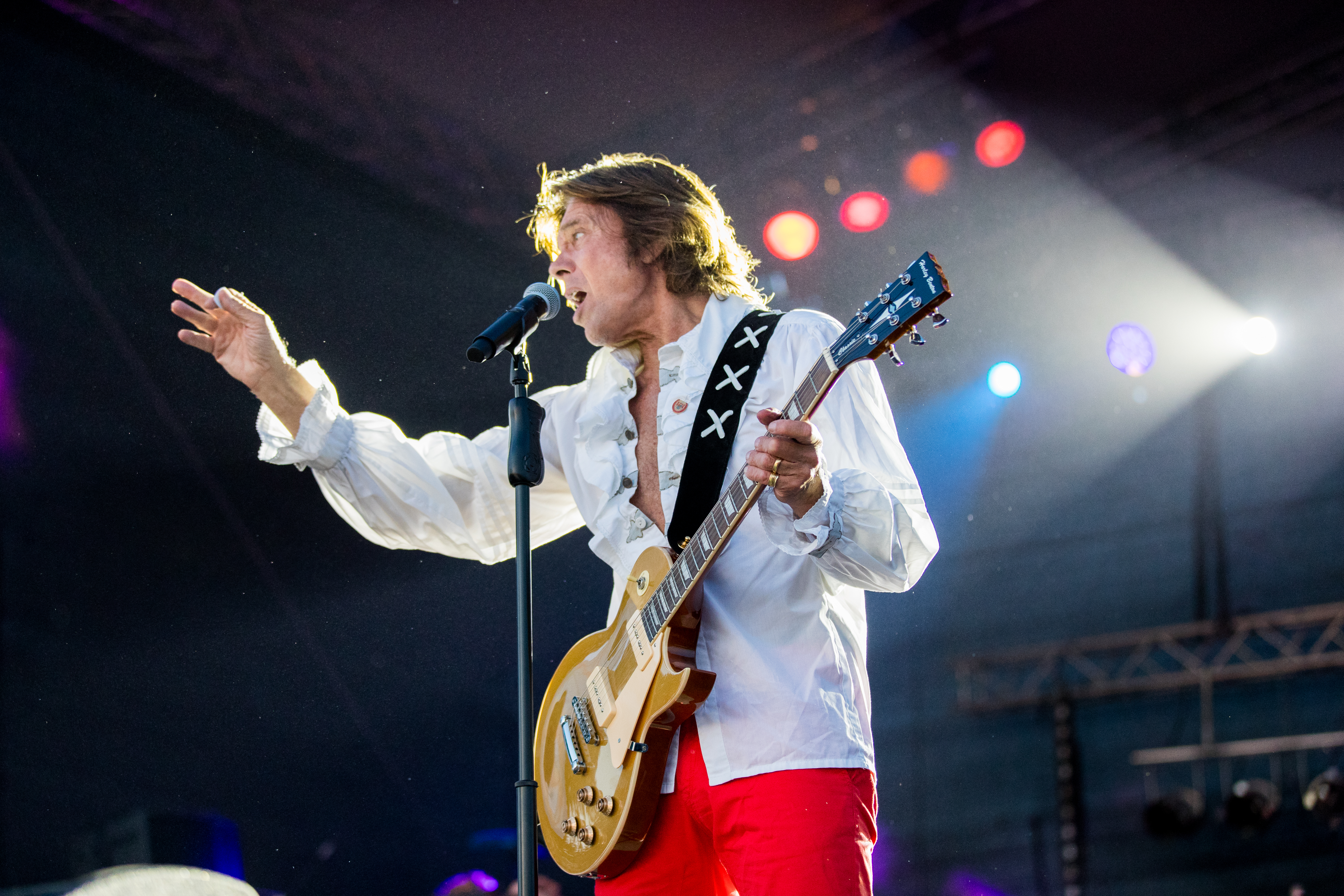
German Schlager singer Jürgen Drews with a Harley Benton Single Cut model (2016)

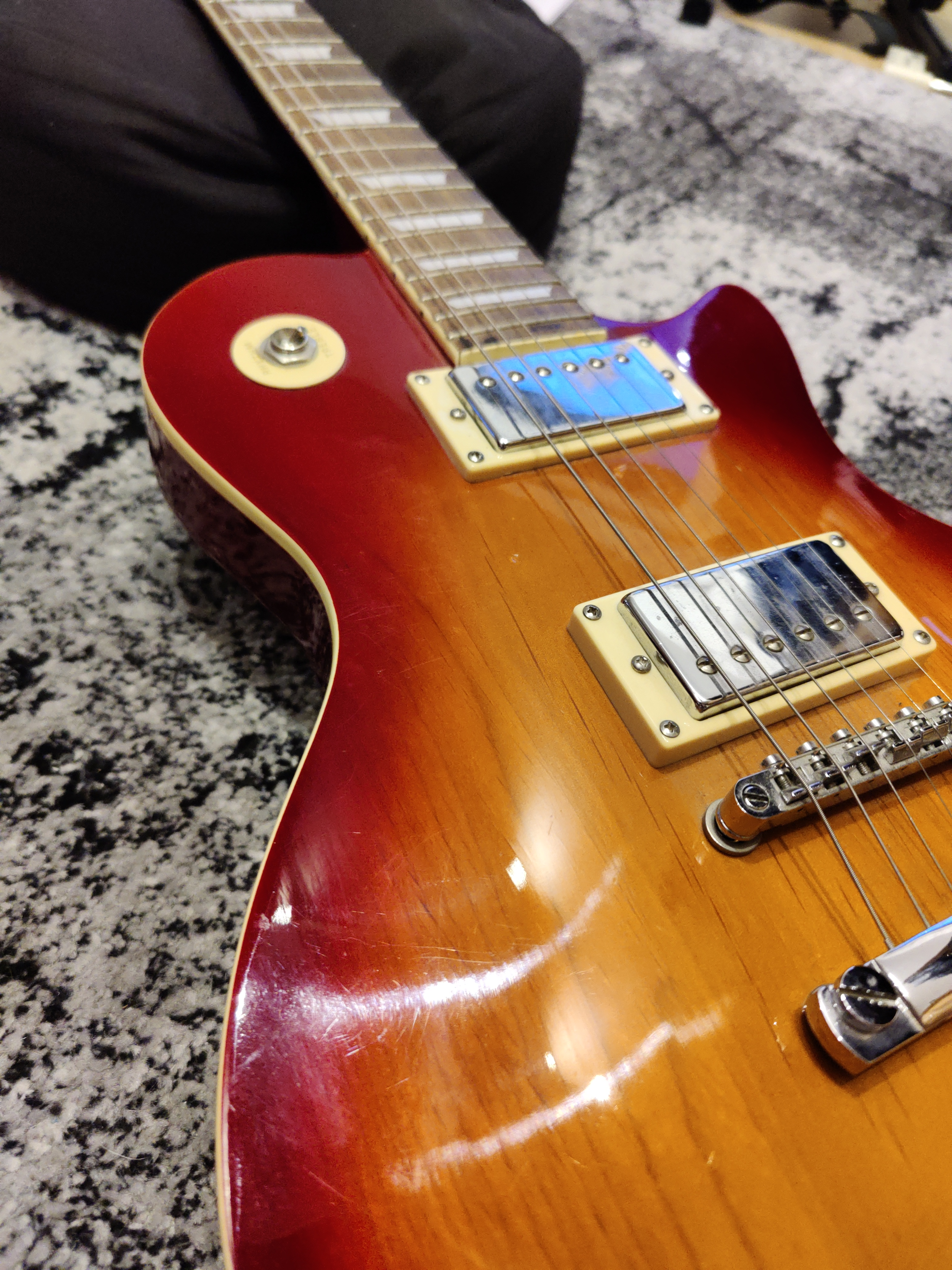
Single cut-model of the Harley Benton brand in sunburst finish

Harley Benton is the house brand for stringed instruments, their amplifiers, and harmonicas of Musikhaus Thomann, a large trader for instruments and audio equipment from Bavaria, Germany.

The brand generally targets the budget market, trying to provide higher quality instruments than usually found at the respective price points. For the lower mid-price range (the high end of the price bracket Harley Benton covers), this is achieved by offering features usually reserved for higher-priced instruments, such as torrified (roasted or heat treated) necks, special finishes, or stainless steel frets.

Most Harley Benton products are guitars of various kinds, including electric guitars, acoustic guitars, classical guitars, lap steel guitars, and bass guitars. Outside of its main business of guitars, the Harley Benton line of instruments also includes banjos, mandolins, ukuleles, diatonic harmonicas, electric violins, and electric violas. Harley Benton also sells amplifiers, pedals and strings.

Harley Benton guitars are manufactured in around 20 factories in China, Indonesia and Vietnam.

== Notable guitar models ==
- Electric guitars (ST series, TE series, SC series, DC series, Fusion series, HB series)
- Acoustic guitars (CLD series, CLA series, HBO series)
- Classical guitars (CG series, HBO series)
