= Lisberg (Verwaltungsgemeinschaft) =

- Verwaltungsgemeinschaft
- Location of Lisberg within Bamberg district
- Interactive map of Lisberg
- Location within Germany Location within Bavaria
- Coordinates: 49°53′N 10°44′E
- Country: Germany
- State: Bavaria
- Admin. region: Upper Franconia
- District: Bamberg
- Seat: Lisberg
- Subdivisions: 2 municipalities

Area
  - Total: 16.72 km^{2} (6.46 sq mi)

Population (2025-12-31)
  - Total: 3,198
  - Density: 191.3/km^{2} (495.4/sq mi)
- Time zone: UTC+01:00 (CET)
  - Summer (DST): UTC+02:00 (CEST)
- Website: www.vg-lisberg.de

Lisberg is a Verwaltungsgemeinschaft (municipal association) in the district of Bamberg in Bavaria, Germany. Its seat is in Lisberg. It consists of the following municipalities:

1. Lisberg
2. Priesendorf
