= Lisberg Castle =

Castle in Bavaria, Germany

Coordinates: 49.8841°N 10.7270°E

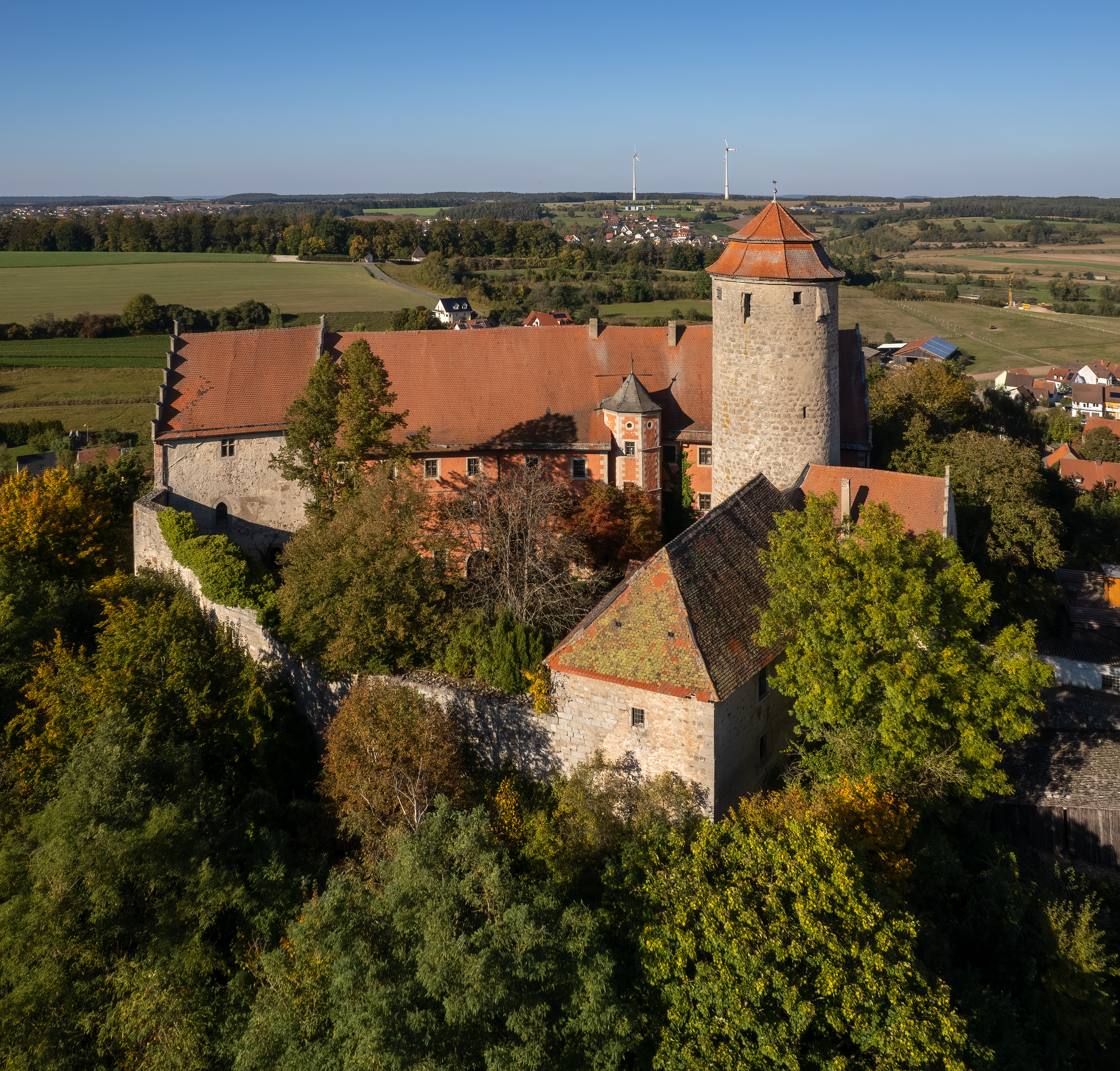
Lisberg Castle

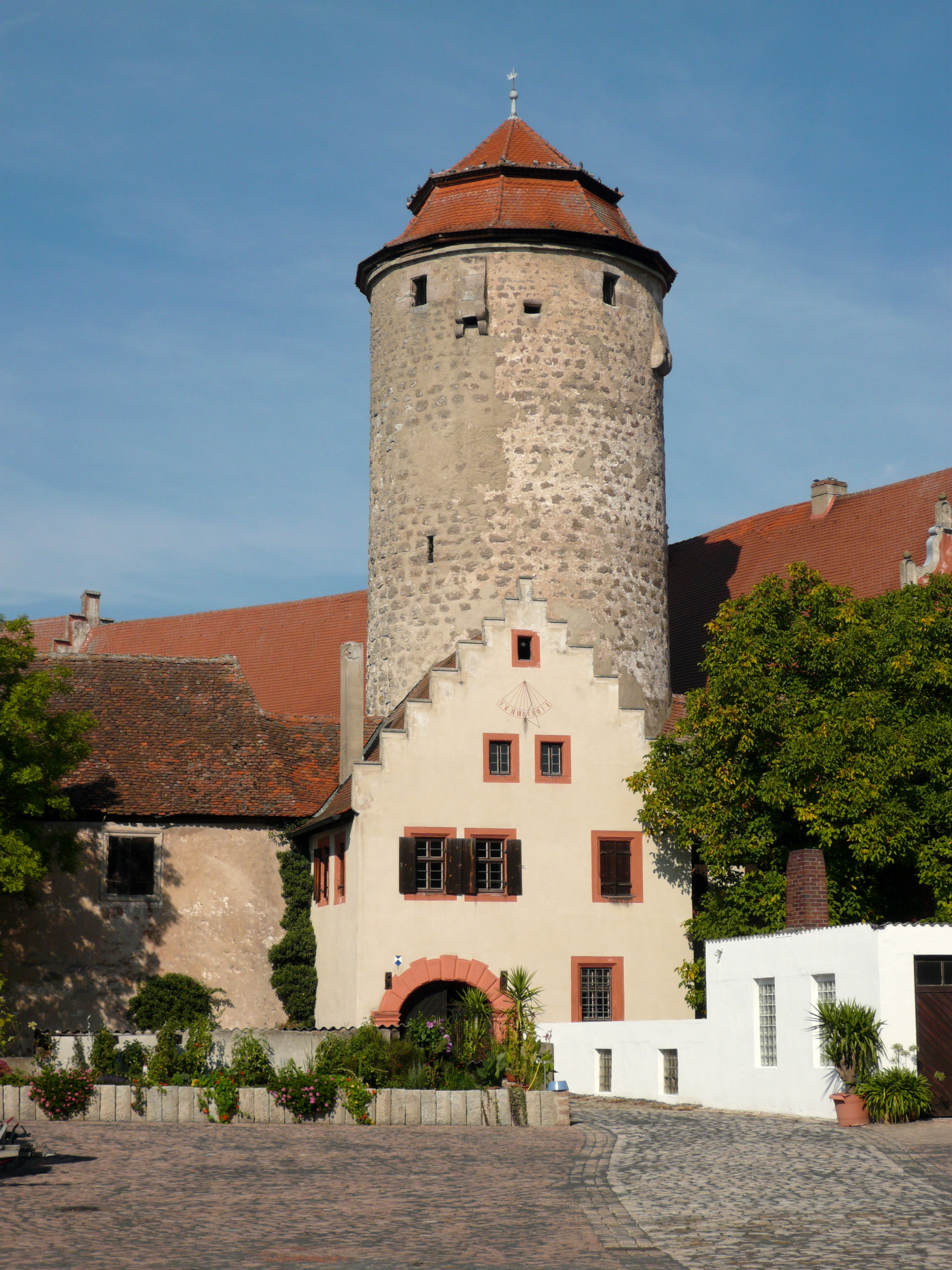
Tower of the castle in 2008

The Lisberg Castle (German: Burg Lisberg) is a spur castle from the Early Middle Ages that lies 328m above sea level in the Bavarian municipality of Lisberg near Trabelsdorf in the district of Bamberg.
