= Schönbrunn im Steigerwald =

Schönbrunn i.Steigerwald
- Municipality
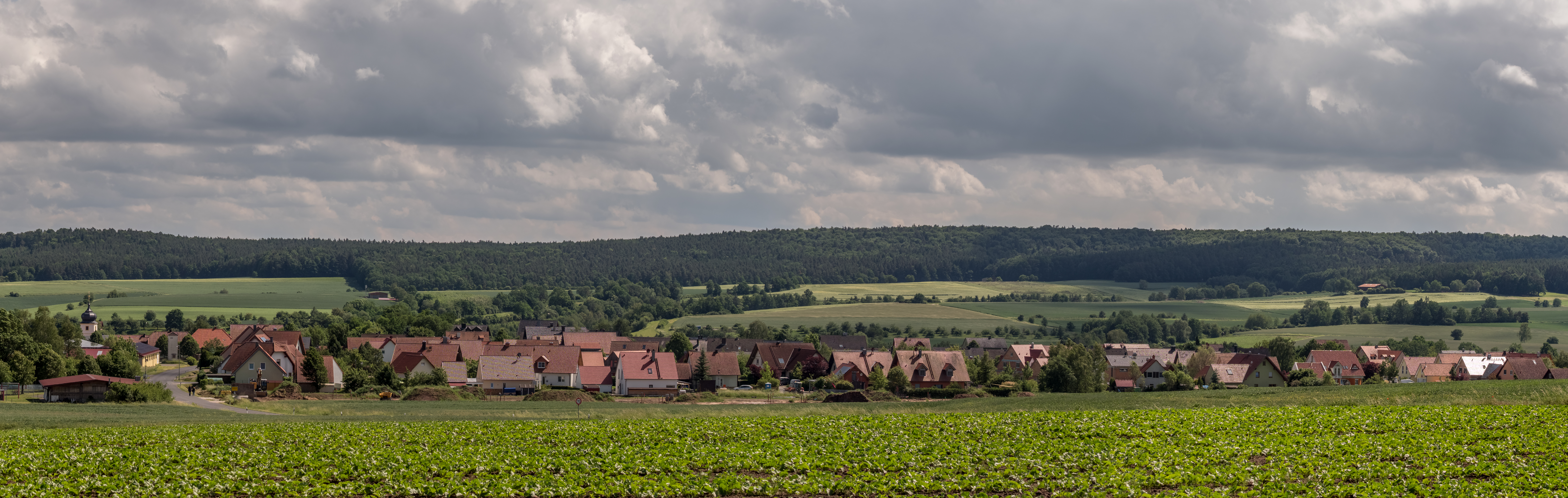
- Panorama view of Schönbrunn im Steigerwald

- Coat of arms

- Location of Schönbrunn i.Steigerwald within Bamberg district
- Interactive map of Schönbrunn i.Steigerwald
- Location within Germany Location within Bavaria
- Coordinates: 49°52′N 10°42′E
- Country: Germany
- State: Bavaria
- Admin. region: Oberfranken
- District: Bamberg
- Municipal assoc.: Burgebrach
- Subdivisions: 9 Ortsteile

Government
  - Mayor (2020–26): Dirk Friesen

Area
  - Total: 24.7 km^{2} (9.5 sq mi)
- Elevation: 280 m (920 ft)

Population (2025-12-31)
  - Total: 1,903
  - Density: 77.0/km^{2} (200/sq mi)
- Time zone: UTC+01:00 (CET)
  - Summer (DST): UTC+02:00 (CEST)
- Postal codes: 96185
- Dialling codes: 09546
- Vehicle registration: BA
- Website: www.vg-burgebrach.de

Schönbrunn im Steigerwald (German pronunciation: [ˈʃøːnbʁʊn ʔɪm ˈʃtaɪɡɐvalt], lit. 'Schönbrunn in the Steigerwald'; officially: Schönbrunn i.Steigerwald) is a municipality in the Upper Franconian district of Bamberg and a member of the administrative community (Verwaltungsgemeinschaft) of Burgebrach.

== Constituent communities ==
Schönbrunn’s main and namesake centre is the biggest of its Ortsteile with a population of 1,012. The community furthermore has these outlying centres, each given here with its own population figure:

- Frenshof: 174
- Fröschhof: 9
- Grub: 123
- Halbersdorf: 95
- Niederndorf: 69
- Oberneuses: 68
- Steinsdorf: 301
- Zettmannsdorf: 166

as of: 31 December 2004

The community also has 5 traditional rural land units, known in German as Gemarkungen, named Grub, Halbersdorf, Schönbrunn im Steigerwald, Steinsdorf and Zettmannsdorf, the same names as 5 of the constituent communities (it is traditional for a Gemarkung to be named after a town or village lying nearby).

== History ==
The Bamberg bishop Berthold von Leiningen (1257–1285) acquired the castle and the village of Schönbrunn in 1280. The Amt established here was bit by bit slowly incorporated into the Amt of Burgebrach between the early 16th and mid-18th century. As part of the territories of the Prince-Bishopric of Bamberg it passed with the Reichsdeputationshauptschluss of 1803 to Bavaria. In the course of administrative reform in Bavaria, today’s community came into being under the Gemeindeedikt (“Community Edict”) of 1818.

=== Population development ===
Within municipal limits, 1,793 inhabitants were counted in 1970, 1,732 in 1987 and 1,887 in 2000. On 30 June 2007, 1,932 inhabitants were counted. Over the next two and a half years, the population shrank slightly and on 31 December 2006 it was 1,902.

== Politics ==
The mayor is Dirk Friesen (CSU).

=== Community council ===
The community council is made up of x members, listed here by party or voter community affiliation, and also with the number of seats that each holds:

- CSU: 5
- BBL (Bürgerblock): 4
- CWG (Christliche Wählergemeinschaft): 2

In 1999, municipal tax revenue, converted to euros, amounted to €621,000 of which business taxes (net) amounted to €98,000.

== Economy and infrastructure ==
According to official statistics, there were 157 workers on the social welfare contribution rolls working in producing businesses, and in trade and transport none. In other areas, 39 workers on the social welfare contribution rolls were employed, and 696 such workers worked from home. In processing businesses there were eight businesses, and in construction six. Furthermore, in 1999, there were 56 agricultural operations with a working area of 1,118 ha, of which 982 ha was cropland and 199 ha was meadowland.

== Education ==
In 1999, the following institutions existed in Schönbrunn im Steigerwald:

- one kindergarten with 75 places and 72 children
- one elementary school with 10 teachers and 175 pupils
