= Lisberg =

- Municipality
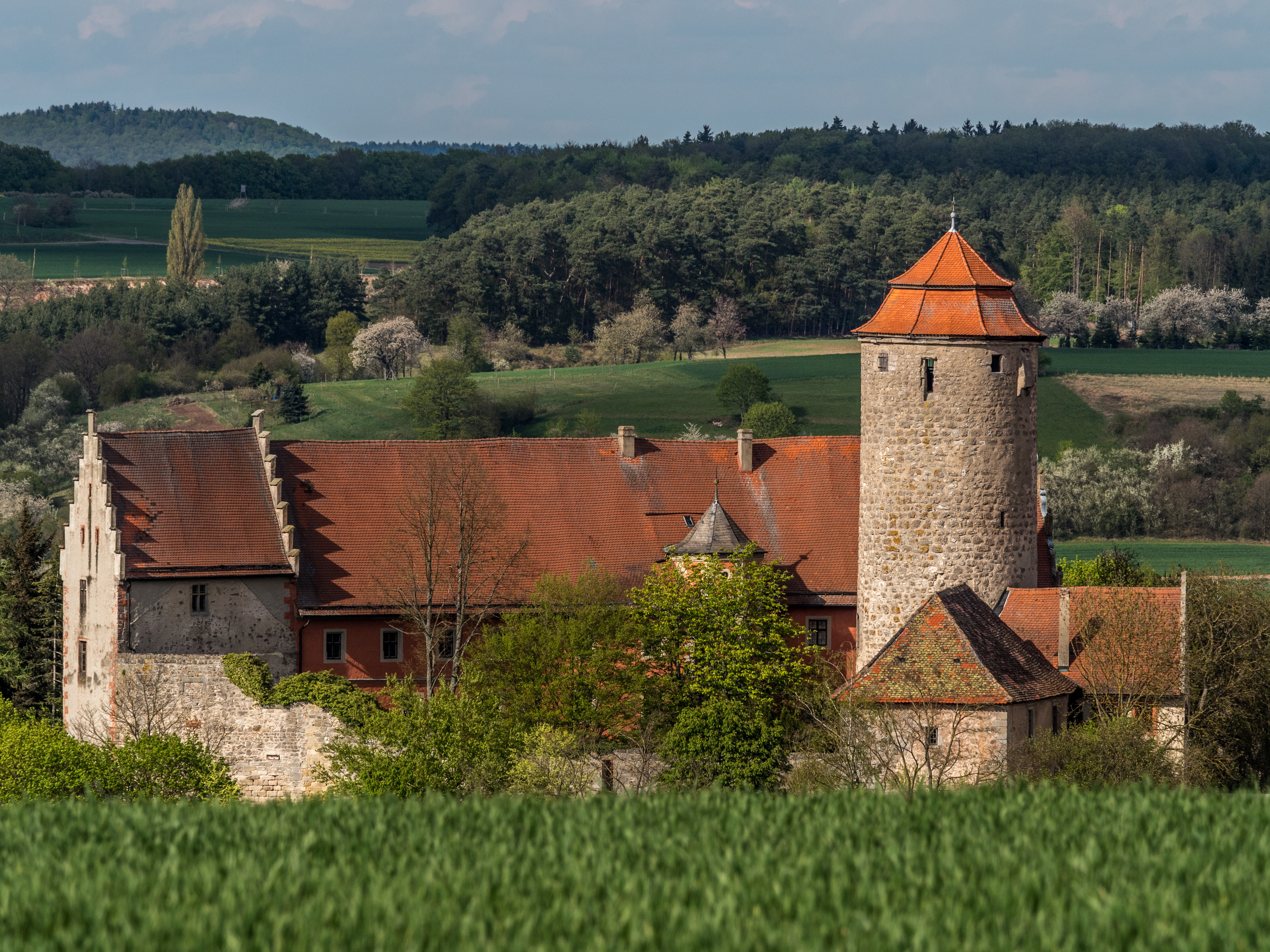
- Lisberg Castle

- Coat of arms

- Location of Lisberg within Bamberg district
- Interactive map of Lisberg
- Location within Germany Location within Bavaria
- Coordinates: 49°52′03″N 10°47′22″E
- Country: Germany
- State: Bavaria
- Admin. region: Oberfranken
- District: Bamberg
- Municipal assoc.: Lisberg
- Subdivisions: 4 Ortsteile

Government
  - Mayor (2020–26): Michael Bergrab

Area
  - Total: 8.36 km^{2} (3.23 sq mi)
- Elevation: 288–384 m (945–1,260 ft)

Population (2025-12-31)
  - Total: 1,745
  - Density: 209/km^{2} (541/sq mi)
- Time zone: UTC+01:00 (CET)
  - Summer (DST): UTC+02:00 (CEST)
- Postal codes: 96170
- Dialling codes: 09549
- Vehicle registration: BA
- Website: www.lisberg.de

Lisberg is a municipality in Bavaria, Germany. It is in the Upper Franconian district of Bamberg and a member of the administrative community (Verwaltungsgemeinschaft) of Lisberg, lying in the Steigerwald (forest).

== Geography ==
Lisberg lies west of Bamberg.

=== Constituent communities ===
Lisberg’s main and namesake centre is the biggest of its Ortsteile, although Trabelsdorf is not much smaller. The community has these centres, each given here with its own population figure:

- Lisberg: 998
- Neumühle: 1
- Trabelsdorf: 794
- Triefenbach: 15

The community also has 2 traditional rural land units, known in German as Gemarkungen, named Lisberg and Trabelsdorf, the same names as 2 of the constituent communities (it is traditional for a Gemarkung to be named after a town or village lying nearby).

== History ==
Lisberg is noticeable even from far away for the Burg Lisberg. This castle had its first documentary mention in 820 in a donation document, and it is among Germany’s oldest undestroyed castles. From 1600 to 1707, the Protestant line of the Barons of Münster held Lisberg as a fief, and then until 1790 the Catholic line did so. The castle is now privately owned. Concerts are sometimes held in the castle’s courtyard.

The palatial residence (Schloss) in the outlying centre of Trabelsdorf was acquired in 1664 by the Marshals of Ostheim and in 1700, it was newly built. It now houses the administrative community (Verwaltungsgemeinschaft) of Lisberg (whose member communities are Lisberg and Priesendorf) and a medical practice.

With the Act of the Confederation of the Rhine in 1806, the Barons of Münster-Lisberg saw their overlordship pass to Bavaria. The community of Lisberg has existed since 1978, consisting of the two formerly autonomous communities of Lisberg and Trabelsdorf.

South of Lisberg can be found a Jewish graveyard on a plot of higher ground with some 130 gravestones. In Lisberg, about 1825, there were 17 Jewish families. The number had shrunk so sharply by the early 20th century, however, that the synagogue was sold.

== Politics ==
Lisberg’s municipal council consists of 12 members besides the mayor, 6 of whom likewise belong to the ÜPL, and the other 6 of whom are CSU members.

In 1999, municipal tax revenue, converted to euros, amounted to €640,000 of which business taxes (net) amounted to €115,000.

== Culture and sport ==
Lisberg is regularly the venue for the so-called Donnersbergklassiker (“Thunder Mountain Classic”), a cycling race around the Steigerwald (forest).

== Notable people ==
- Maria Aloysia Löwenfels (1915–1942), German nun, born in Trabelsdorf and gassed in Auschwitz
