= Priesendorf =

- Municipality
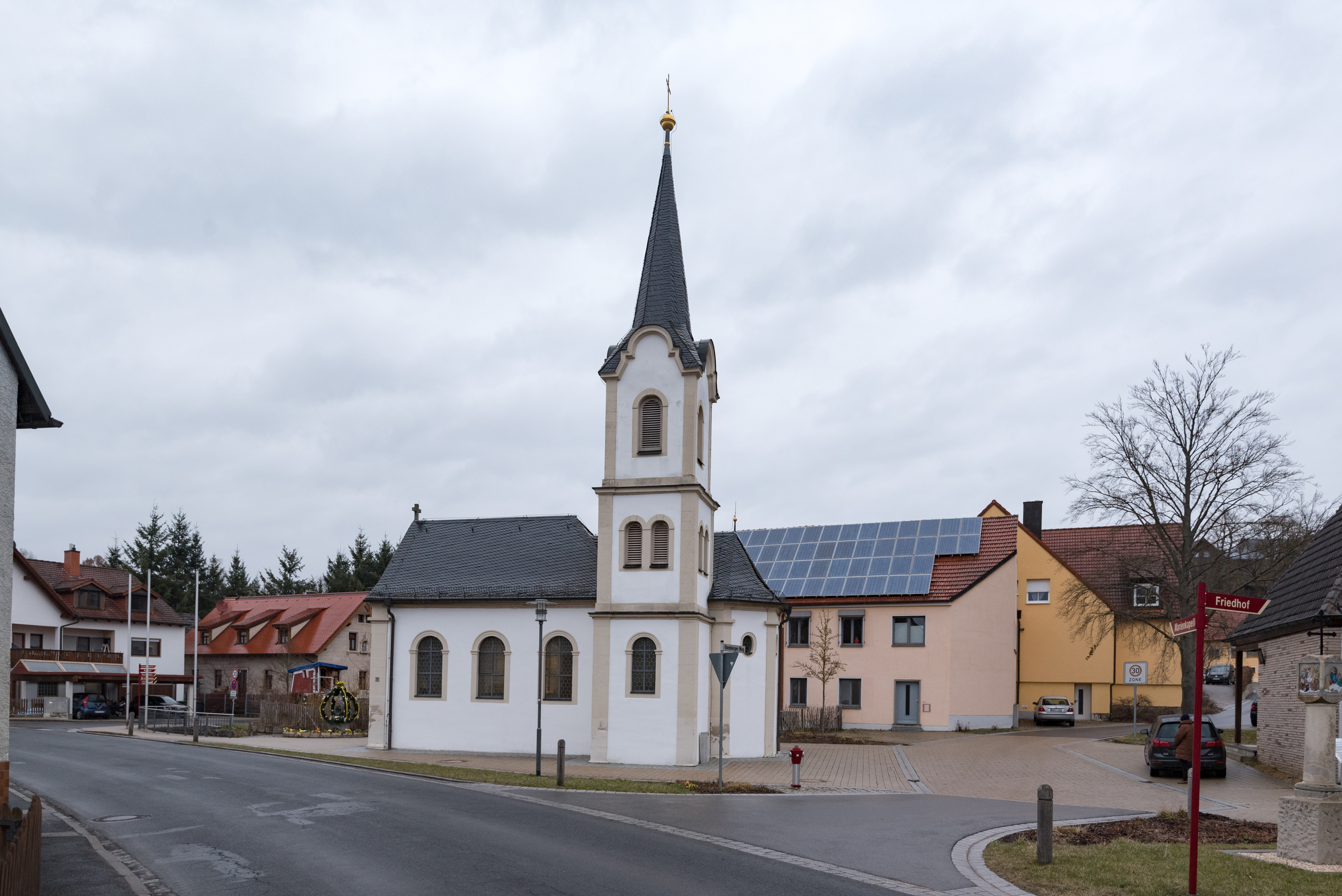
- Chapel of Virgin Mary on the main street

- Coat of arms

- Location of Priesendorf within Bamberg district
- Interactive map of Priesendorf
- Location within Germany Location within Bavaria
- Coordinates: 49°54′N 10°42′E
- Country: Germany
- State: Bavaria
- Admin. region: Oberfranken
- District: Bamberg
- Municipal assoc.: Lisberg
- Subdivisions: 2 Ortsteile

Government
  - Mayor (2020–26): Matthias Krapp (CSU)

Area
  - Total: 8.35 km^{2} (3.22 sq mi)
- Elevation: 297 m (974 ft)

Population (2025-12-31)
  - Total: 1,453
  - Density: 174/km^{2} (451/sq mi)
- Time zone: UTC+01:00 (CET)
  - Summer (DST): UTC+02:00 (CEST)
- Postal codes: 96170
- Dialling codes: 09549
- Vehicle registration: BA
- Website: Official website

Priesendorf is a municipality in the Upper Franconian district of Bamberg and a member of the administrative community (Verwaltungsgemeinschaft) of Lisberg.

== Geography ==
The community lies in the Steigerwald (forest) on the small river Aurach on the boundary between Upper and Lower Franconia.

=== Constituent communities ===
Priesendorf's main and namesake centre is by far the bigger of its Gemeindeteile with a population of 1,237. The community furthermore has the outlying centre of Neuhausen with a population of 264.

The community also has two traditional rural land units, known in German as Gemarkungen, also named Priesendorf and Neuhausen (it is traditional for a Gemarkung to be named after a town or village lying nearby).

== History ==
Priesendorf belonged to the Barons Münster at Lisberg and was part of the knightly estate of Lisberg. With the Act of the Confederation of the Rhine in 1806, the community passed to Bavaria.

=== Population development ===
Within municipal limits, 1,056 inhabitants were counted in 1970, 1,240 in 1987 and 1,456 in 2000. On 30 June 2007 it was 1,532.

== Politics ==
The mayor is Matthias Krapp (CSU), elected in 2020.

The community council is made up of 12 members, listed here by party or voter community affiliation, and also with the number of seats that each holds:

- CSU 7 seats
- Freie Wähler 2 seats
- SPD 2 seats
- Christliche Wählergemeinschaft 1 seat

In 1999, municipal tax revenue, converted to euros, amounted to €508,000 of which business taxes (net) amounted to €29,000.

== Economy and infrastructure ==
According to official statistics, there were 26 workers on the social welfare contribution rolls working in agriculture or forestry in 1998, 184 in producing businesses, and in trade and transport 5. In other areas, 28 workers on the social welfare contribution rolls were employed, and 546 such workers worked from home. In processing businesses there were three businesses, and in construction two. Furthermore, in 1999, there were 29 agricultural operations with a working area of 406 ha, of which 282 ha was cropland and 99 ha was meadowland.

== Education ==
In 1999, the following institutions existed in Priesendorf:

- One kindergarten with 100 places
- One primary school with 14 teachers and 273 pupils
