= History of Franconia =

The "Rake" – Franconia's coat of arms

Franconia (German: Franken) is a region that is not precisely defined, but which lies in the north of the Free State of Bavaria, parts of Baden-Württemberg and South Thuringia and Hesse in Germany. It is characterised by its own cultural and linguistic heritage. Its history began with the first recorded human settlement about 600,000 years ago. Thuringii, Alemanni and Franks, who gave the region its name, settled the area in the Early Middle Ages. From the mid-9th century, the Stem Duchy of Franconia emerged as one of the five stem duchies of the Empire of East Francia. On 2 July 1500, during the reign of Emperor Maximilian I, as part of the Imperial Reform, the empire was divided into Imperial Circles. The Franconian Circle, which was formed as a result of this restructuring, became decisive in the creation of a Franconian national identity. A feature of Franconia in the Middle Ages and Early Modern Period was its Kleinstaaterei, an extreme fragmentation into little states and territories. In the 19th century under Napoleon, large parts of Franconia were incorporated into the newly created Kingdom of Bavaria.

== Prehistory and Antiquity ==
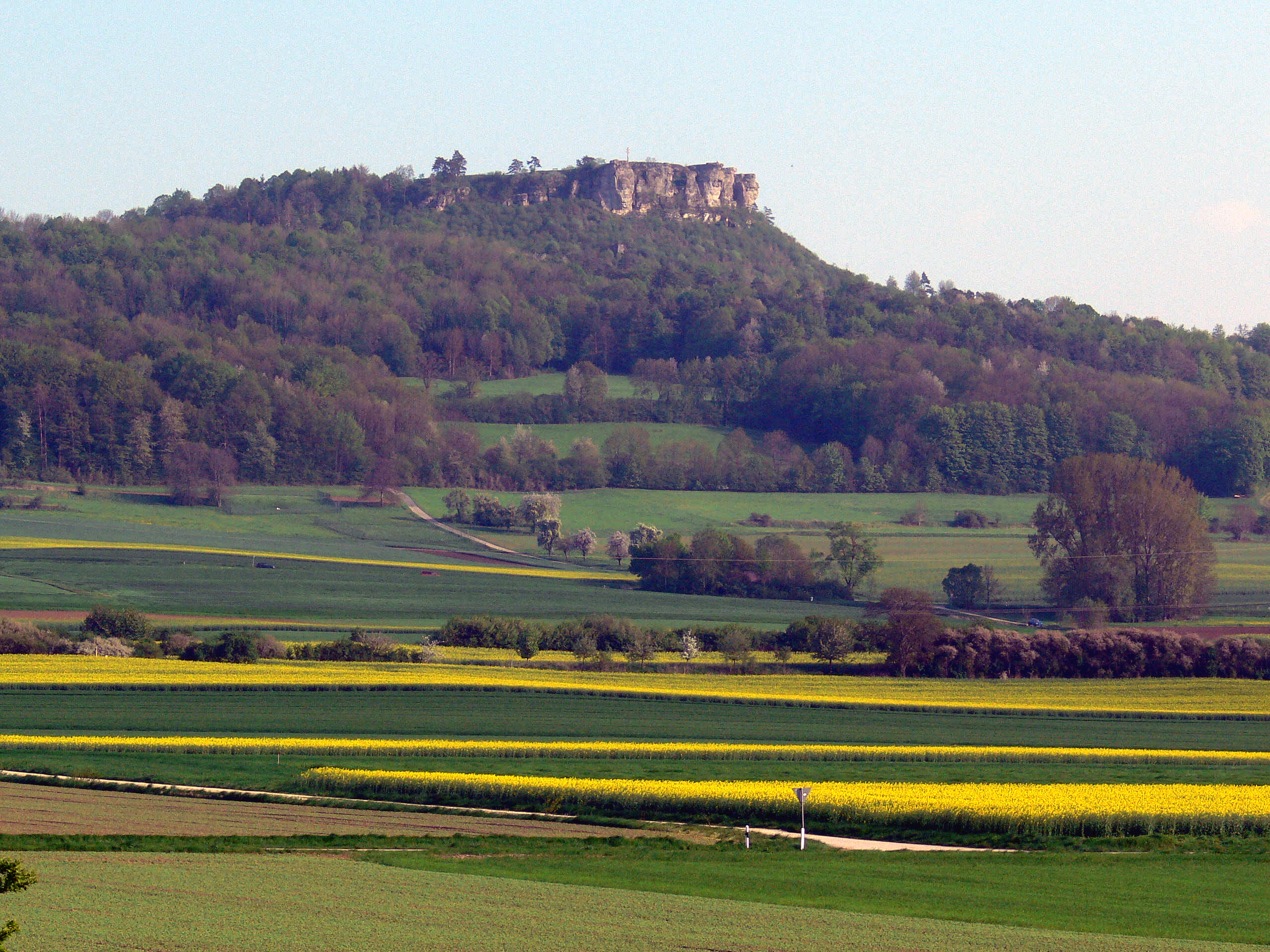
On the Staffelberg the Celts erected the mighty fortress of Menosgada.

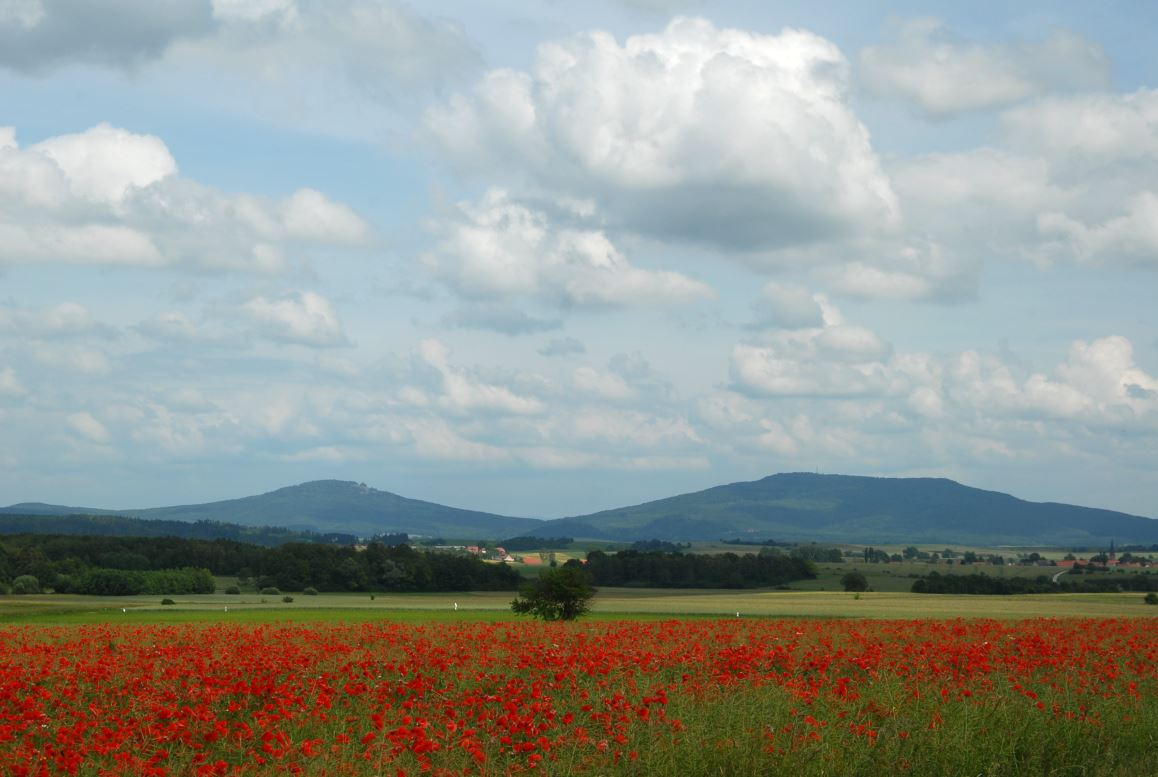
The Gleichberge

Archaeological finds of artifacts in Kronach and on the Schalksberg in Würzburg show that the region had already been settled by the middle ice age (the Pleistocene), about 600,000 years ago, by primitive man (Homo erectus). Fossils have also been found dating to the later phases of the Pleistocene. But the oldest find of human remains in Franconia comes from the cave ruins of Hunas at Pommelsbrunn in the county of Nürnberger Land.

In the early Bronze Age, the region was probably inhabited only relatively sparsely, as few noble metals occur here and the soils are only moderately fertile. However, in the late Bronze Age, a warrior elite of the so-called Urnfield culture (1200-800 BC) began to establish themselves on hilltops like the Ehrenbürg, the Hesselberg or the Marienberg above Würzburg. A particularly large site from this period was located on the Heunischenburg near Kronach in Upper Franconia. In nearby Thonberg, a helmet has been found dating to this period. Another helmet of this era was discovered at Ebing near Bamberg.

In the course of the Iron Age which followed (from about 800 BC), the Celts became the first identifiable tribe in the region. They built a chain of hillforts in northern Franconia as a defensive line against the Germani who were pressing in from the north. On the Staffelberg they built a mighty settlement, which was mentioned by Ptolemy under the name of oppidum Menosgada. Another was built on the Gleichberge: the largest surviving oppidum in Central Germany, the Steinsburg. With the accelerating expansion of Rome in the first century BC and the simultaneous advance of the Elbe Germanic tribes from the north, Celtic culture began to decline. A Germanic cemetery from this period, which was used for a long time, is located in what is now Altendorf in the county of Bamberg.

The southern parts of present-day Franconia soon fell under Roman control; however, most of the region was permanently in free Germania. This area was populated by the Marcomanni until, following their defeat by Rome roughly between 7 and 3 BC, they moved away further to the east into present-day Bohemia and were replaced by other Elbe Germanic tribes such as the Hermunduri. Initially Rome tried to extend its immediate influence far to the northeast, as witnessed by the legion camp at Marktbreit that was discovered in 1986 at the top of the River Main triangle. In the longer term, however, the Germanic-Roman frontier was established further southwest.

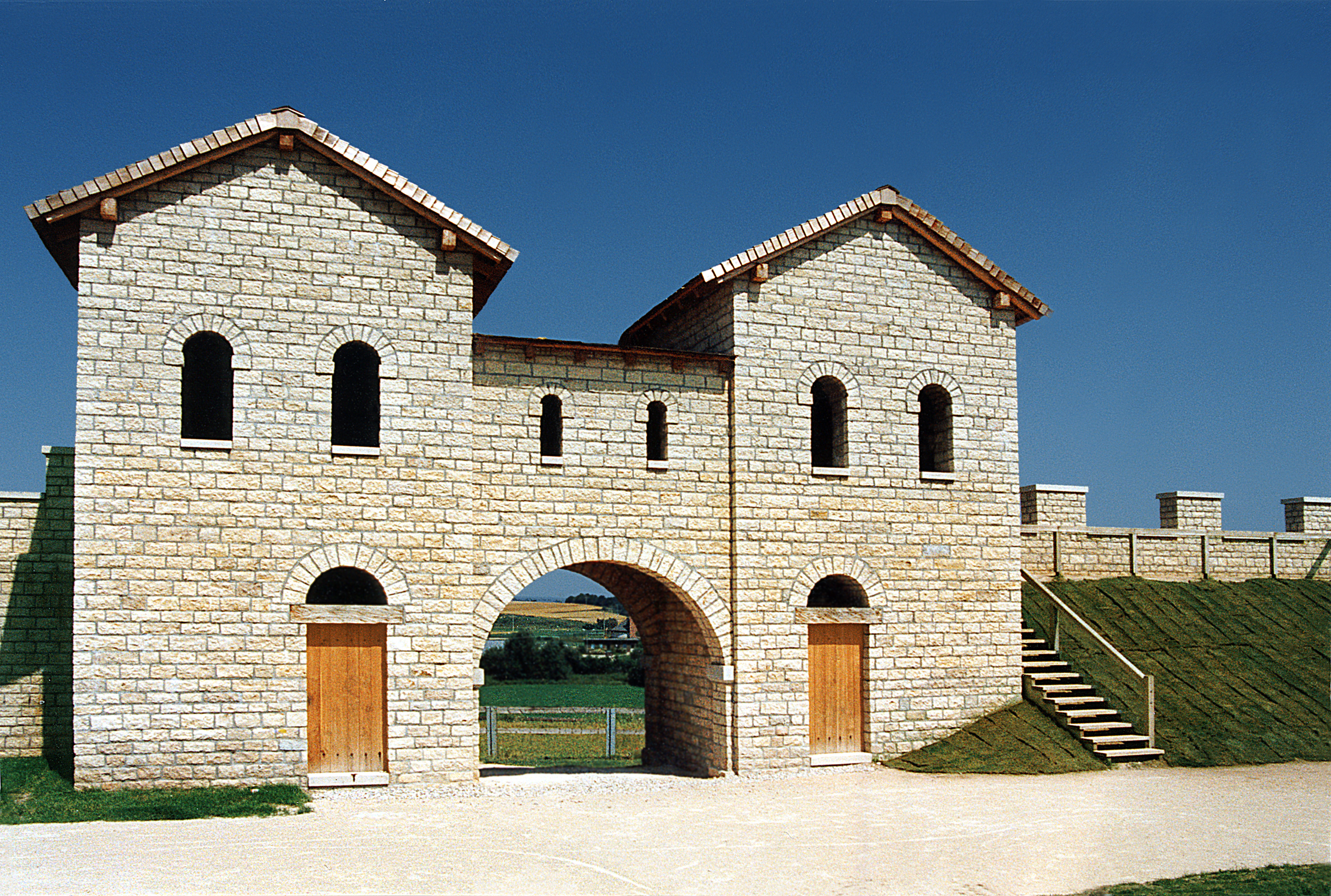
1990 replica of the Porta decumana of the Roman castle Biriciana. View over the camp ring road.

Under the emperors Domitian (81-96 AD), Trajan (98-117 AD) and Hadrian (117-138 AD) the Roman Limes formed the boundary with the tribes to the north. This defensive line bisected the south of Franconia and describes an arc through the region whose northernmost point was located at today's Gunzenhausen. To oversee it, the Romans built several forts, such as Biriciana near Weißenburg or Ruffenhofen at the foot of the Hesselberg. However, by the middle of the third century, the Limes border could no longer be maintained because by 250 AD the Alemanni occupied the areas south of the Limes as far as the Danube.

Fortified settlements as on the Gelbe Bürg near Dittenheim and Reisberg at Scheßlitz controlled the new regions. But north of the former Limes, for example on the Ehrenbürg, the Staffelberg or the Houbirg, more such "Gau castles" (Gauburgen) have been detected. What tribe their occupants belonged to is unknown in most cases. Especially in southern areas it might well have been the Alemanni and the Juthungi. On the lower and middle Main they were certainly Burgundians. They are also believed to have had a site on the Wettenburg near Urphar. But by no later than 500 AD, many of these hill forts appear to have been destroyed. The exact reasons for this are not clear, but they could have fallen prey to invasions by the Huns and the resulting mass migration of Vandals and Suebi that crossed southern Germany. In many cases, however, it was probably conquest by the Franks that spelt the end of these hilltop settlements.

== Middle Ages ==
=== Early Middle Ages ===
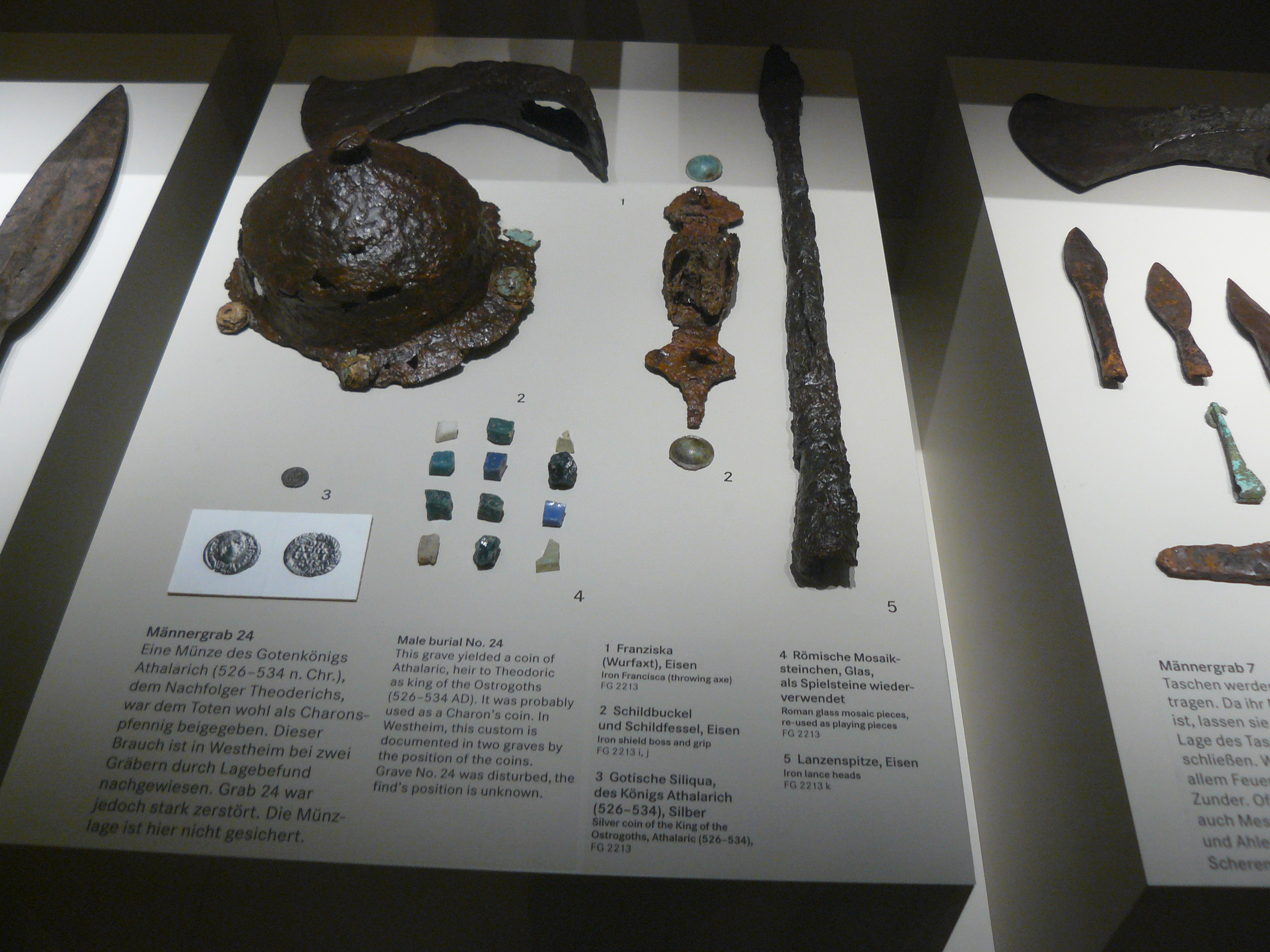
Frankish warrior grave from the early medieval burial site of Westheim

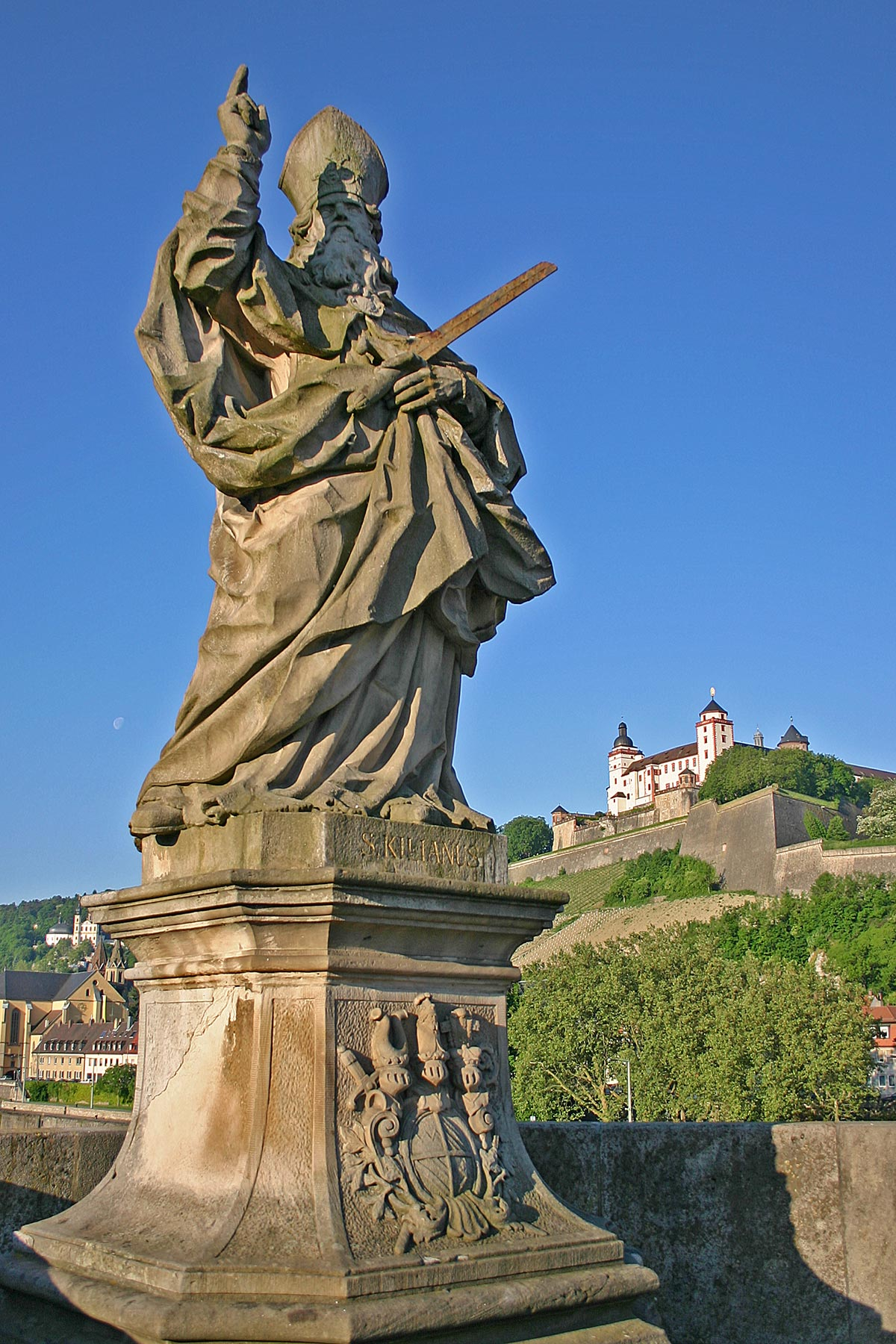
Saint Kilian, patron saint of the Franks

Until the beginning of the 6th century, the East Francian region was caught in the area of tension between the Thuringians and the Alemanni. For example, the Cosmographer of Ravenna in the 7th century, wrote that the rivers Naab and Regen in today's Upper Palatinate joined the Danube in the land of the Thuringians. He apparently obtained this information from older sources, which makes the periodic expansion of Thuringian influence in the 5th and early 6th centuries, at least into Upper Franconia, probable.

According to recent investigations, however, the expansion of Thuringian power into the area of the River Main is not established with certainty. Upper Franconia appears to have had a relationship with Bohemian culture groups until their conquest by the Franks. It is clear that an autochthonous Elbe Germanic people group dominated this area as a bearer of tradition. The heartlands of the present region of Franconia fell to the Franks following victories over the Alamanni in 507 AD and the Thuringians (529-534 AD). At first they were only loosely attached to the Francian Empire. However, it is established that by the 6th century the region was colonized by the Franks, primarily from the Lower Main. In the 7th century, Frankish settlers advanced to the area of the great arc of the Upper Main and the River Regnitz. Shortly thereafter, at least by the mid-7th century, Slavs from the east began to settle the northeastern parts of the region. The Frankish king Dagobert I appointed a man named Hruodi in the central communications hub of Wurzburg to be the duke over the Main lands. It is occasionally speculated that this was the Thuringian duke, Radulf. More likely, however, is that even at that time the Franks had established their own duchy, to create a counterweight to the powerful Thuringian duke. Typical linear burial grounds from this period have been discovered in Westheim, Dittenheim, Gnotzheim, Hellmitzheim, Hettstadt, Kleinlangheim, Klepsau, Neubrunn, Niedernberg, Sulzheim, Weißenburg and Zeuzleben. Individual graves or grave goods from this era have also been discovered in Bad Staffelstein, Hirschaid and Eggolsheim.

The majority of the population in the area probably continued to follow pagan practices well into the Early Middle Ages. Only the king and his subordinate leadership were likely to have been fully Christian. The first to try to spread the Christian faith strongly, were itinerant Irish Anglo-Saxon monks. One of the first was Kilian, who became the apostle to the Franks. Around 685 the Irish preacher and his companions, Colman and Totnan, went to Würzburg where he became a type of bishop. On being murdered, he and his companions became martyrs. Around 741/742, the first Franconian bishopric was founded under Saint Boniface: the Bishopric of Würzburg. In 742 or possibly even a little later, Saint Willibald founded the Bishopric of Eichstatt, which included the southeastern parts of Franconia, but also parts of Bavaria and Alemannic areas.

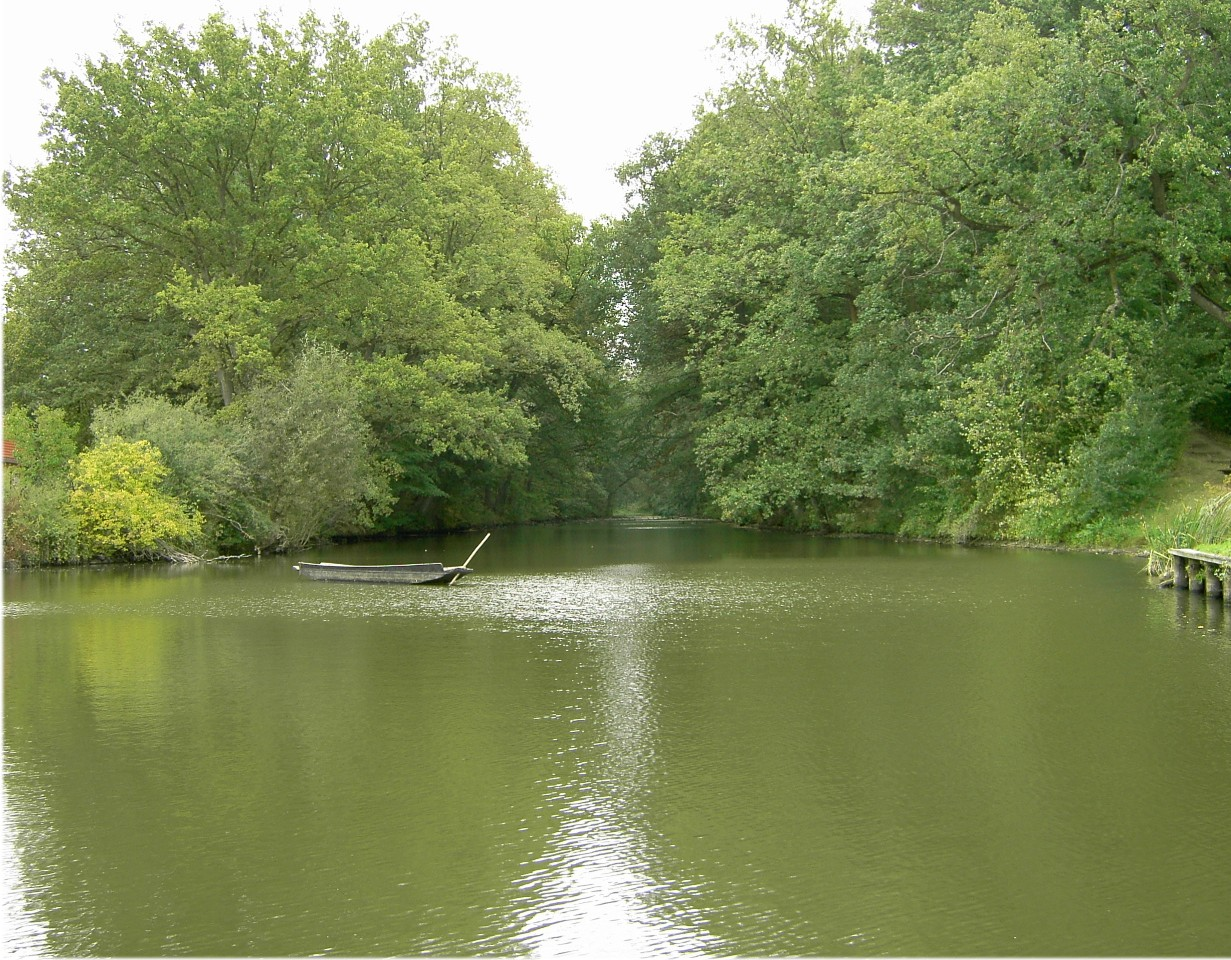
Remains of the Fossa Carolina

Until about the 8th century, the region, which was becoming increasingly important to the Empire, still had no independent name. From the 9th century on, the Main area was referred to as East Francia (Francia Orientalis). However, the same name was given to the whole of the East Francian empire by Charlemagne's successor. Under Charlemagne, attempts were made to build a navigable channel between the River Altmühl and the Swabian Rezat and thus between the Rhine and the Danube near the present site of Graben at Treuchtlingen. Whether this Fossa Carolina or Karlsgraben was ever completed, is still disputed.

=== High Middle Ages ===
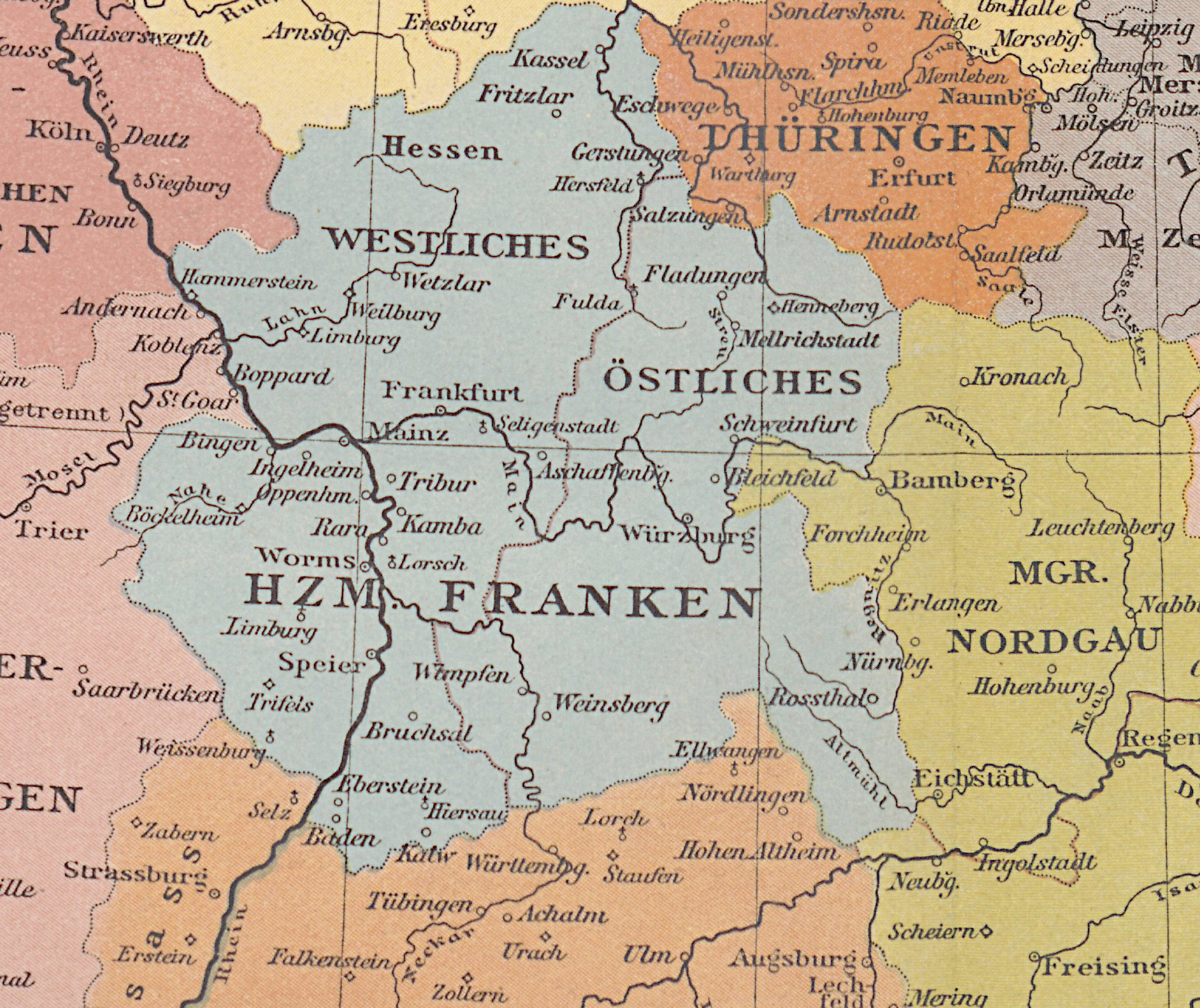
Duchy of Franconia around 800 AD

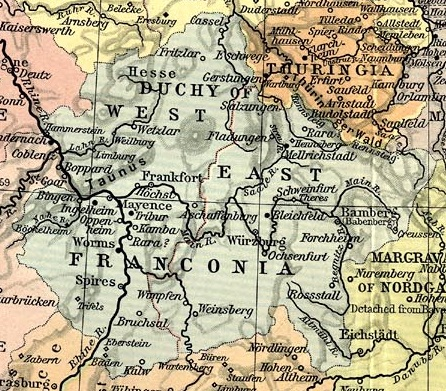
Franconia between 919 and 1125

In the mid-9th century, the Stem Duchy of Franconia emerged, one of the five stem duchies of the East Francian Empire. Present-day Franconia, however, only covers the eastern part of this duchy. Until the 10th century, Franconia also comprised Rhenish or West Franconia. This part covered present-day Hesse, Rhenish Hesse, the Palatinate region, and North Baden, and also included parts of modern Thuringia south of the Rennsteig path.

In the 9th century, the so-called older Babenberg family, also called the Popponids, had a significant position of power in the Main region until a rift developed with the Carolingian kings. The last Carolingian, Louis the Child, finally seized a number of their estates and granted it to members of the Conradine clan, a wealthy family from Rhenish Franconia. In the subsequent Babenberg feud, the Conradines fought the Babenbergs. In the end, most of their estates, including Bamberg, were seized.

When, in 911 AD, Louis the Child died, the Conradine, Conrad I, who had hitherto been Duke of Franconia, was elected in Forchheim as king of East Francia. He gave regional authority over the Duchy of Franconia to his brother, Eberhard of Franconia. After Conrad's death, Henry, Duke of Saxony was elected as the German king. Eberhard of Franconia fell in 939 in the Battle of Andernach fighting Henry's son, Otto the Great. Thereafter, no successor was appointed and the Frankish duchy was directly subordinated to the king. Unlike other tribal duchies, Franconia was from then on the homeland and power base of the East Frankish and German kings. As a result, it never became a strong regional power during the Middle Ages like the duchies of Saxony, Bavaria and Swabia.

Otto I endowed the Schweinfurt counts, who were probably descendants of the Frankish Babenbergs, with numerous offices such as the episcopal seat in Würzburg, and made them counts of the most important Frankish gaus. Consequently, the Franks therefore remained loyal to the crown under Otto and his immediate successors. Otto the Great often stayed in Franconia, including the time in 957 when he met with his rebellious son, Liudolf of Swabia, in Zenna (today Langenzenn) in the Palatinate near Nuremberg.

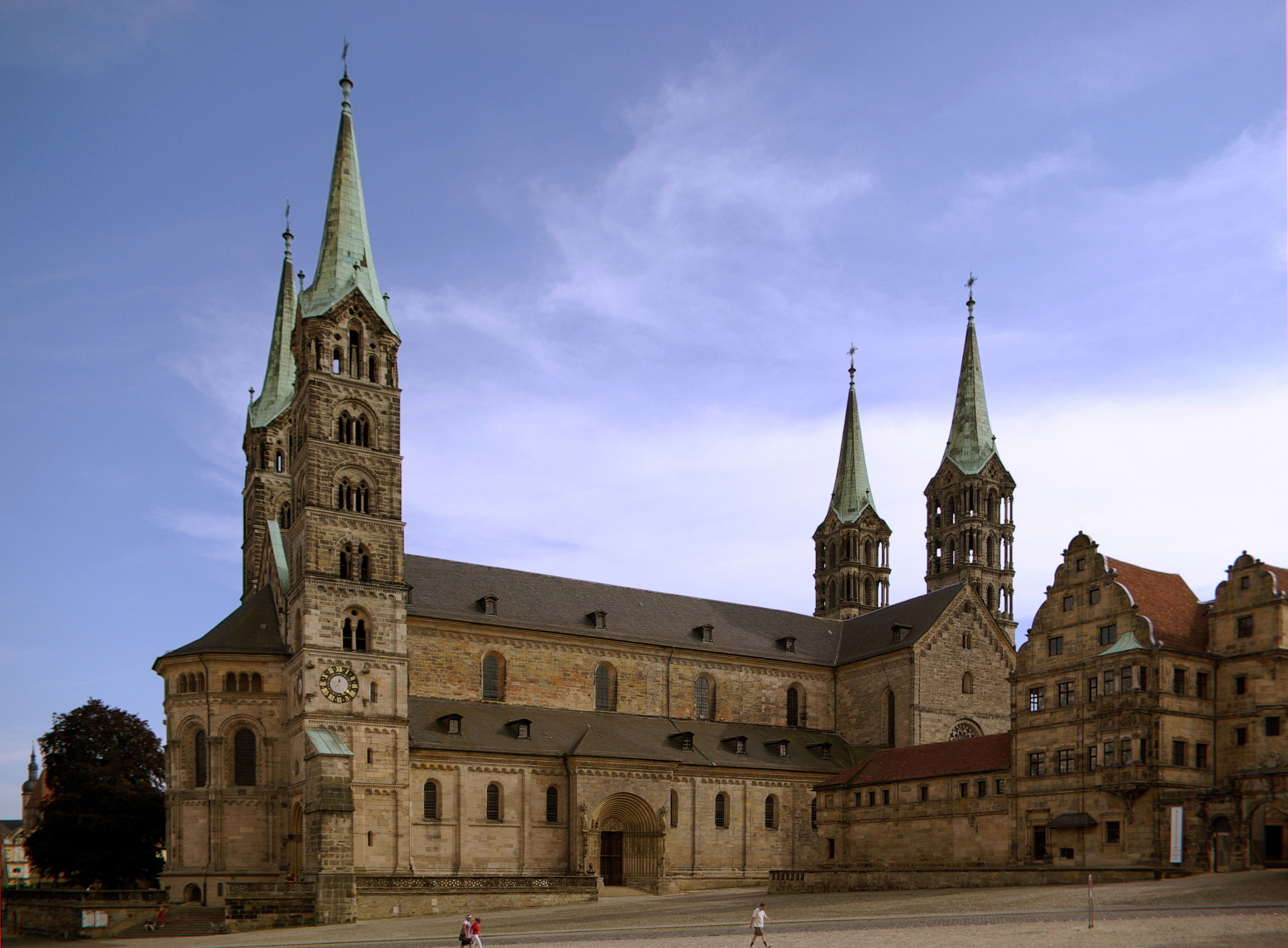
Bamberg Cathedral

In 973 Otto II transferred the important fortress of Babenburg (Bamberg) to the powerful Duke of Bavaria, Henry the Wrangler to win him over. This instigated a rebellion, which was defeated and the Bavarian duchy was smashed. Under Otto III, however, the son of Henry the Wrangler, Henry II, was given his Bavarian duchy back and was even elected king, as the main line of the Ottonians had died out with Otto III in the year 1002. He arranged beforehand to secure the support of the Schweinfurt counts in the elections for king and promised Henry of Schweinfurt the Duchy of Bavaria. However, he broke this promise upon his election in 1002. Thereupon the Schweinfurts joined the king's enemies and instigated the Schweinfurt Feud, but eventually lost. Although Henry of Schweinfurt kept the castles of Hersbruck, Creußen, Kronach, Burgkunstadt and Banz, he lost his comital estates and royal fiefdoms.

In 1007, the later canonized Henry II founded the Bishopric of Bamberg and provided it with rich estates. Bamberg became a preferred Pfalz and an important centre of the kingdom. In Bamberg Cathedral are the remains of Henry II and Pope Clement II who was once Bishop of Bamberg. It is the only grave of a pope north of Alps. Since parts of the Bishopric of Würzburg also fell to Bamberg, Würzburg received several of the royal estates from Henry II as a fiefdom in compensation, including Meininger Mark and the royal estate of Meiningen in Grabfeldgau.

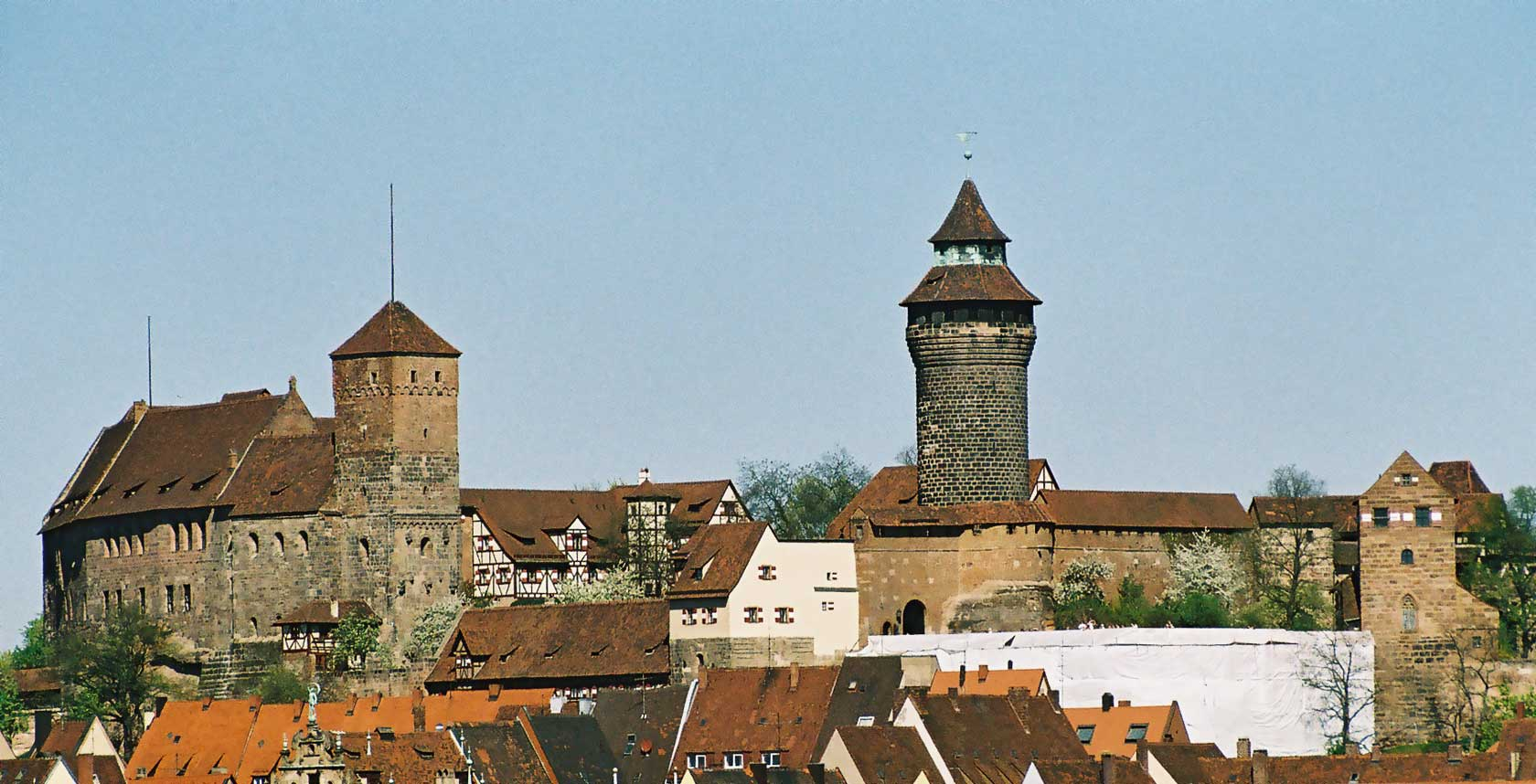
Nuremberg Castle

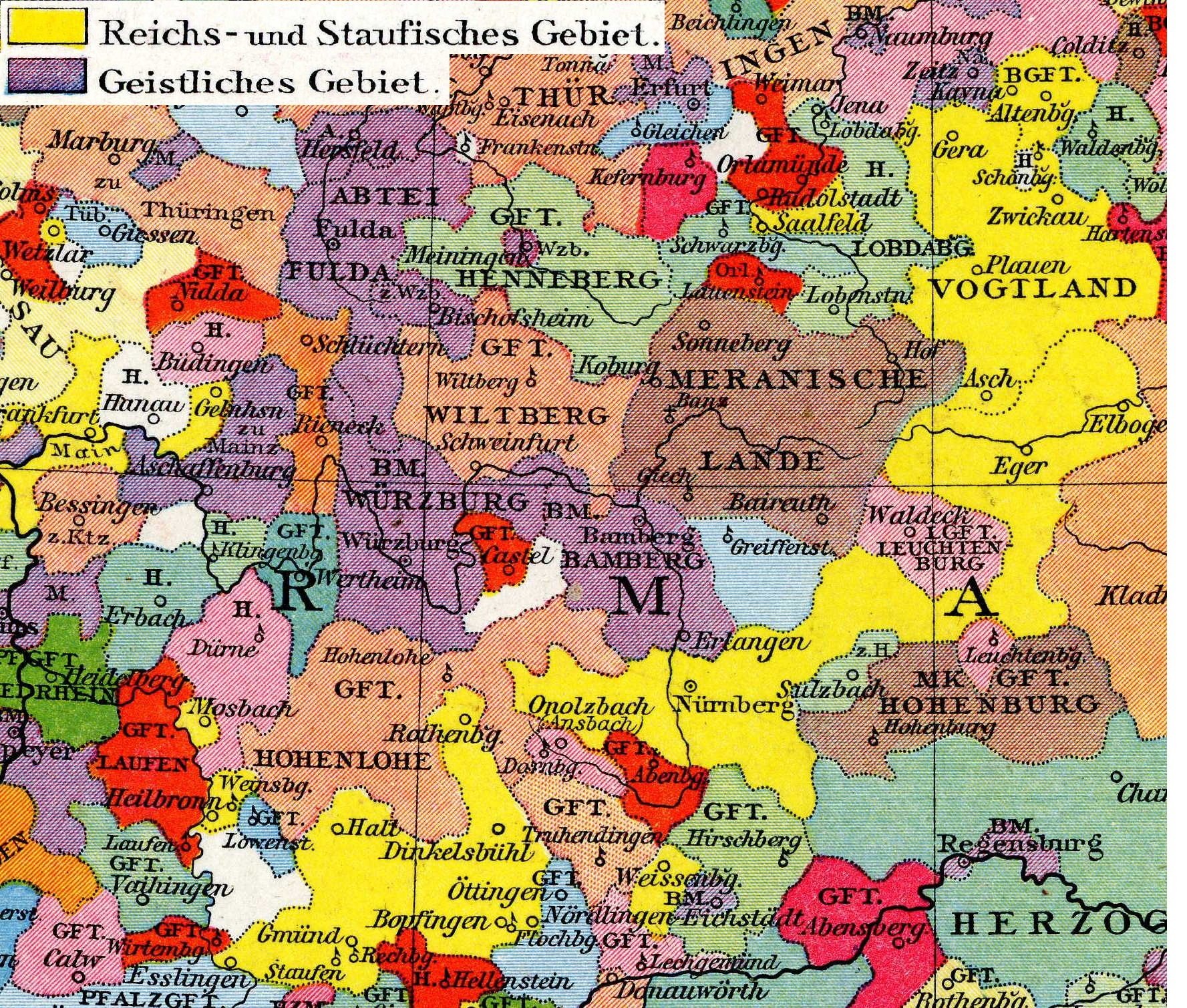
Franconia around the year 1200

The most important areas in the present day region of Franconia were, apart from bishoprics and Hohenstaufen allodial estates, the Meranian lands and the counties of Henneberg, Greifenstein, Wiltberg, Rieneck, Wertheim, Castell, Hohenlohe, Truhendingen and Abenberg.

Under the Salian, Henry III, Nuremberg, first recorded in 1050, was expanded into a new centre of power for the royal authority. The aim was to restrict the great influence of Bamberg, and in this way to cut off former Bamberg territories like Langenzenn or areas south of Forchheim from Bamberg itself. Bamberg forests in the vicinity of Nuremberg were declared as Imperial Forests (Reichswäldern) and the market rights of Fürth were transferred from Bamberg to Nuremberg. Under the turbulent reign of his son, Henry IV, however, Forchheim and Fürth fell to Bamberg again. When Bavaria, Swabia and Saxony rose up against the king, Franconia became one of the most important bases of support for the king. The Bishopric of Bamberg benefited again from this situation and remained loyal to the king in the ensuing Investiture Dispute. By contrast, the Bishop of Wurzburg joined the king's enemies who, in 1077 in Forchheim, elected Rudolf of Rheinfelden as counter-king. He was not able to prevail over Henry however.

Under the Hohenstaufen kings, Conrad III and Frederick Barbarossa, Franconia became the centre of gravity of their land. Important bases of support were Würzburg and Nuremberg. At that time Würzburg was one of the biggest towns north of the Alps with around 4,000 to 5,000 inhabitants. From 1190/1191, Philip of Swabia, the youngest son of Emperor Frederick Barbarossa, was the bishop elect, i.e. the chosen Bishop of Würzburg. After the death of his brother, Henry VI, he was supposed to take the throne as his successor. Originally destined for a career in the church, Philip was therefore one of the few German kings who could read and write. Barbarossa and his grandson, Frederick II built new Hohenstaufen centres of power with the imperial palaces (Pfalzen) of Gelnhausen, Seligenstadt and Wimpfen, and extended the Hohenstaufen imperial lands between Rothenburg, Nördlingen and Nuremberg. Around this time lived the famous poet, Wolfram von Eschenbach, who came from Wolframs-Eschenbach.

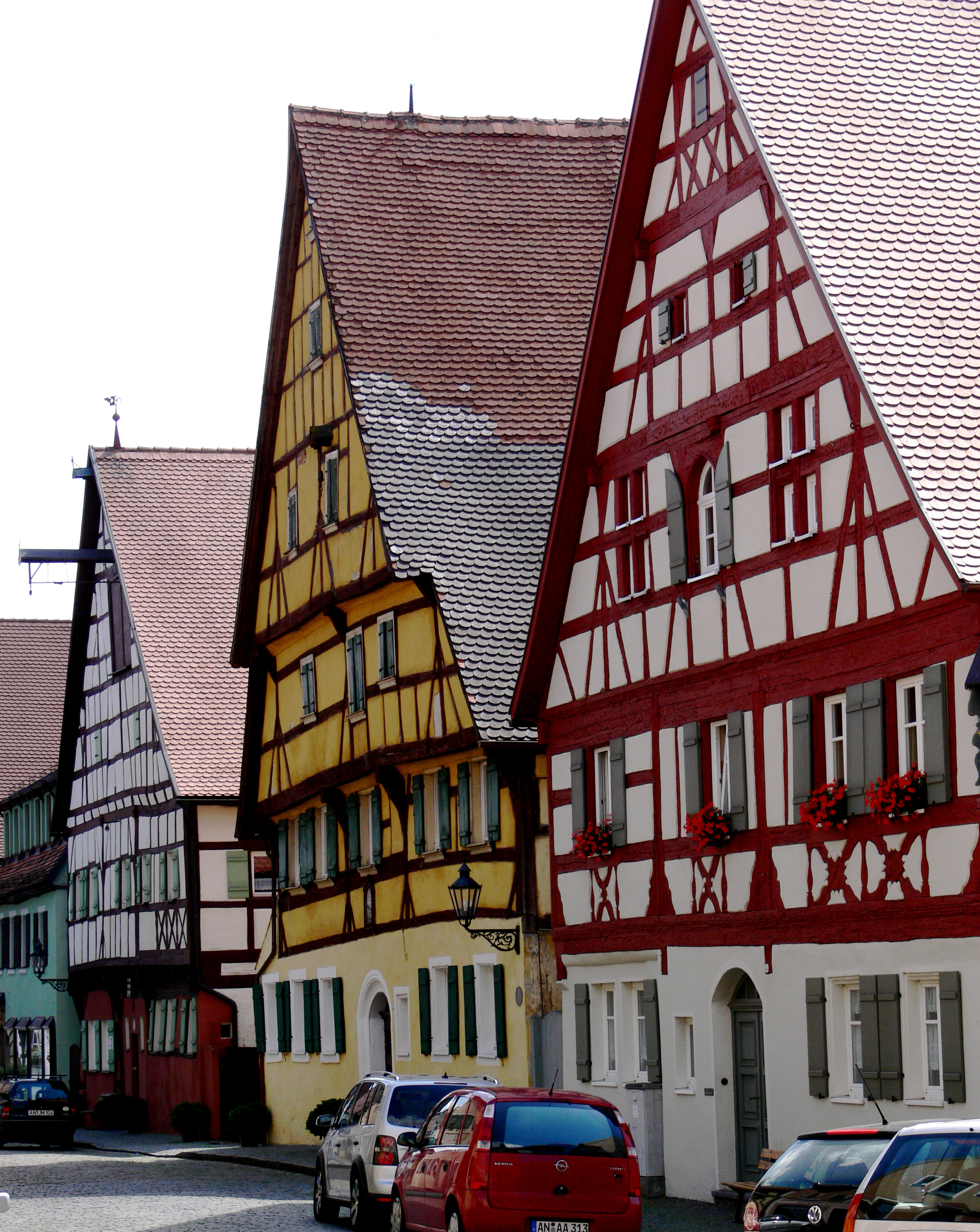
Timber-framed houses in Wolframs-Eschenbach

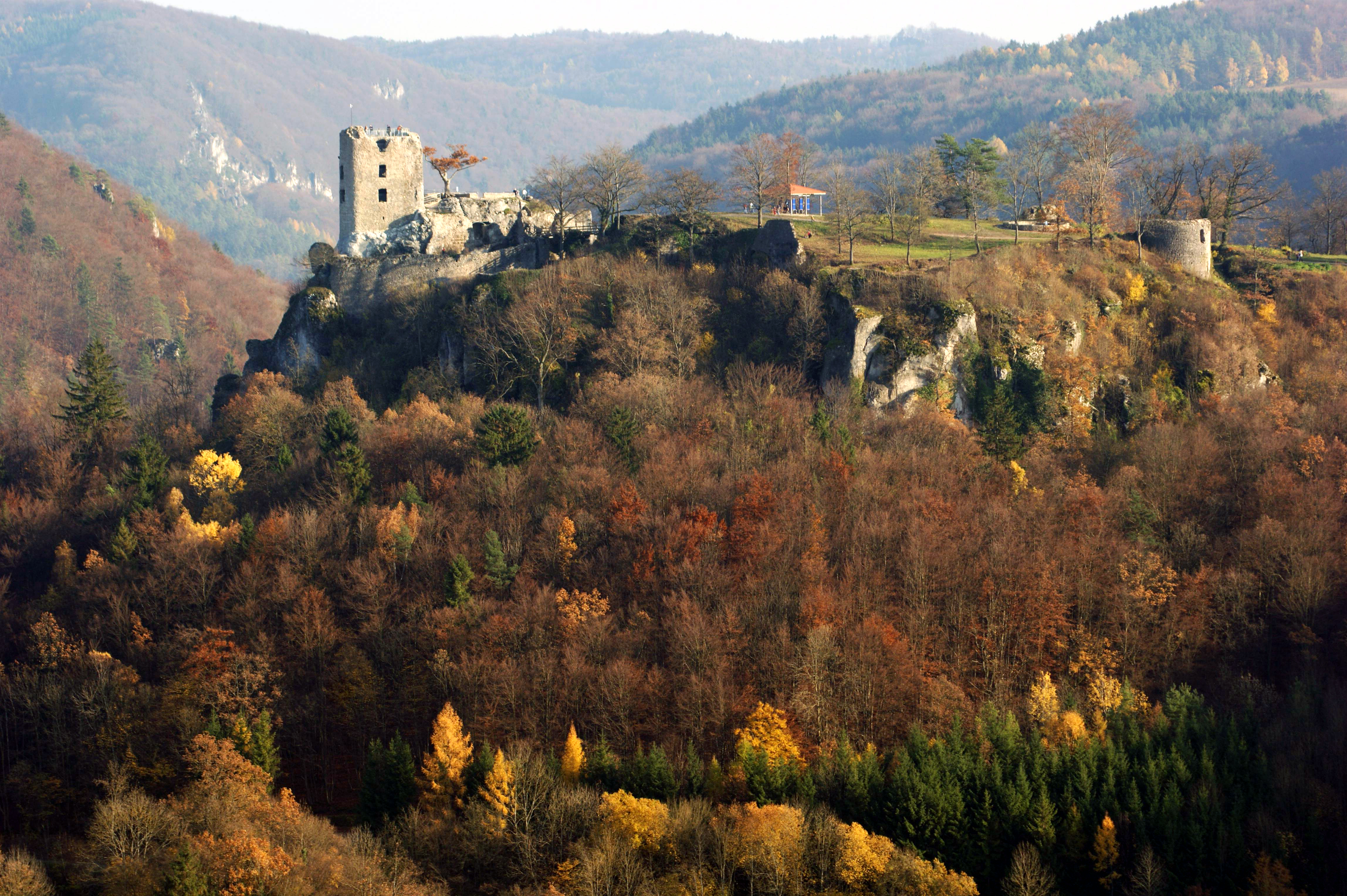
The ruins of Neideck Castle, once the seat of the Counts of Schlüsselberg

Originally the king's sovereignty was almost entirely supported by the bishops, but by the mid-13th century several powerful noble families also succeeded in securing stronger positions of power within Franconia. The most important were the counts of Rieneck, the counts of Wertheim and the House of Hohenlohe in the west, the counts of Henneberg, Truhendingen and Orlamünde in the north and the Schlüsselberg and counts of Castell in the centre. In the far south the ministerialis family of Pappenheim shielded Franconia from the Duchy of Bavaria. The Andechs family, originally Bavarian nobles, occupied a dominant position in Upper Franconia with the Duchy of Merania, until the death of Otto VIII in 1248 when it was divided among other ruling families. In addition, the Teutonic Order held wealthy estates in the region. The counts of Zollern achieved particular importance when they inherited the Burgraviate of Nuremberg in 1192. In the Late Middle Ages members of the princely family of Hohenzollern became electors of Brandenburg, in the Modern Era kings of Prussia and from 1871, emperors of the newly founded German Empire.

=== Late Middle Ages ===
In the emperor-less period, the Interregnum (1254-1273), individual princes became increasingly powerful. After the Interregnum rulers succeeded, however, in re-establishing a strong royal following in Franconia. Franconia played an important role for the monarchy as early as the reign of Rudolf of Habsburg and the Itinerariesof the kings that followed him demonstrated a preference for the Rhine-Main area. In spite of all that, Franconia fragmented into a Kleinstaaterei. In addition to the dioceses of Würzburg and Bamberg, and the greater nobility there were the numerous knightly estates (Ritterschaften) of the lower nobility.

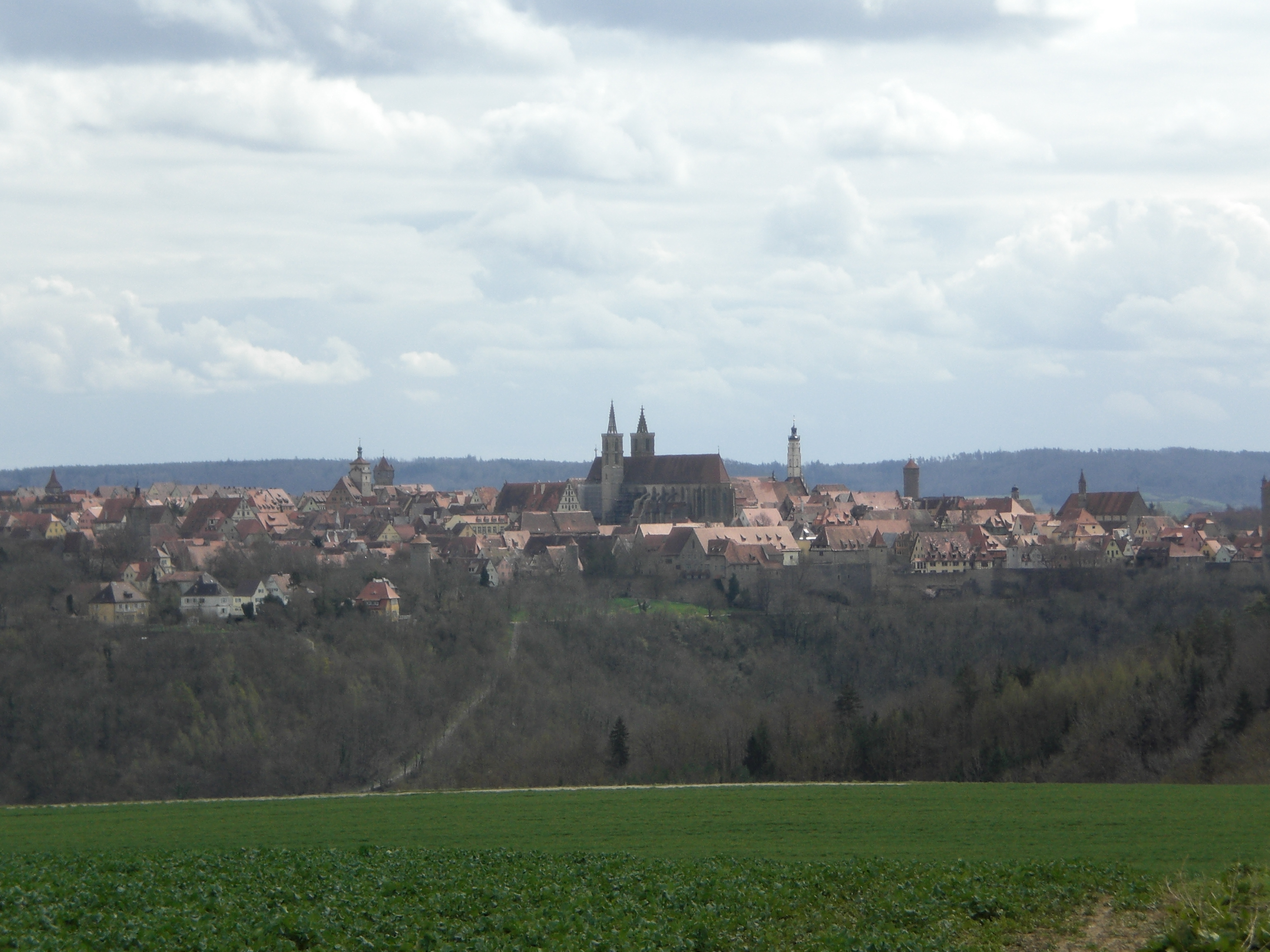
Rothenburg ob der Tauber, once a free imperial city

With the exception of free cities, which were subject directly to the empire, the influence of the emperor in all secular and spiritual territories was very restricted. Under Louis the Bavarian the Imperial City of Nuremberg benefited especially from many new privileges, which made it an economically, but also politically, important metropolis. For example, the Imperial Regalia were kept in Nuremberg from 1423 onwards.

From the time that the counts of Zollern were awarded with the March of Brandenburg in 1415, their Frankish possessions were also designated as margraviates. In First Margrave War (1449-1450) the Zollern, Albert Achilles of Brandenburg-Ansbach, tried to gain supremacy over Franconia and unsuccessfully besieged the free imperial city of Nuremberg. In the end the margrave failed and had to confine himself to his original estates. Albert bequeathed his eldest son and heir with the March of Brandenburg and his other sons, Frederick and Sigmund, with the areas around Ansbach and Kulmbach. Thus the Franconian territories of the Zollerns were gathered into independent principalities. Even other lords, such as the Prince Bishop of Würzburg, were not able to build a larger, contiguous, territorial power. By contrast, the free imperial city of Nuremberg emerged from the Margrave War victorious and, at the end of the Middle Ages, had the largest imperial municipal area in all of Germany.

The decline of chivalry at the end of the Hohenstaufen period and the increasing use of mercenaries, meant that numerous knights lost their livelihood and became impoverished. As a result, they often turned away from trading and became robber barons. An example was the notorious Eppelein of Gailingen.

== Modern Era ==
=== Emergence of the Franconian Circle ===
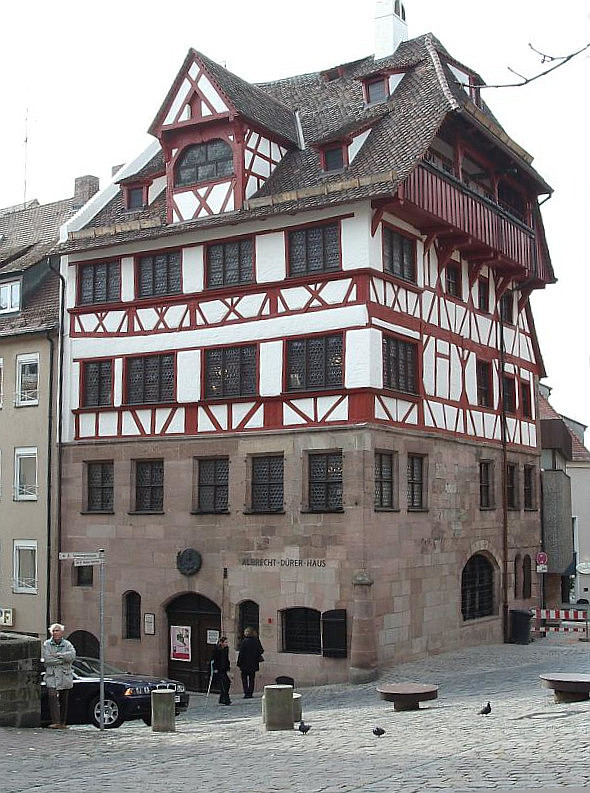
Albrecht Dürer's House in Nuremberg

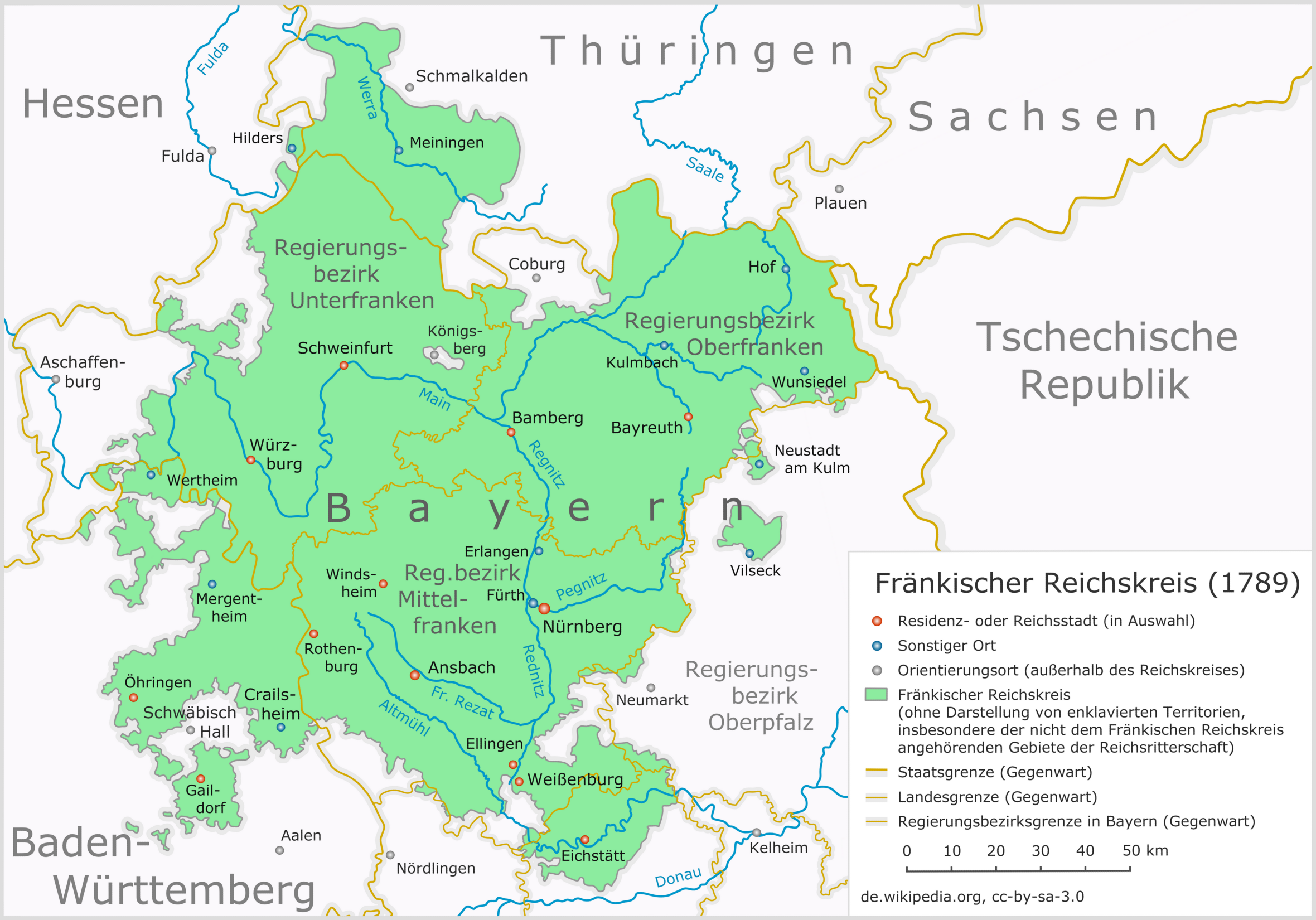
The Franconian Circle in 1789

On 2 July 1500, during the reign of Emperor Maximilian I, the Empire was divided into Imperial Circles in the wake of the Imperial Reform movement. This led to the emergence of the Franconian Circle. Initially, it was only called "Circle No. 1"; not until 1522 was it first referred to as the "Franconian Circle".

The Imperial Circles were not territories, but regional groupings of neighbouring imperial estates in order to carry out common tasks. These included the call up of forces for the Imperial Army in accordance with the Imperial Register, the election of judges to the Imperial Court, the supervision of the coinage, the preservation of peace under the Landfrieden and so on. The Franconian Circle which, like the other Imperial Circles, existed until the end of the Holy Roman Empire in 1806, appears from today's perspective to have been an important basis for the development of the present day sense of Franconian identity in this otherwise very politically fragmented region. Although the bishops of Würzburg continued to bear the ancient title of the dukes of Franconia, they had no practical sovereignty over the whole region. Instead, in the Late Middle Ages and Modern Era, Franconia was badly affected by the fragmentation that resulted in the Kleinstaaterei in Germany. Completely different forms of government jostled one another. For example, Nuremberg and Schweinfurt were Free Imperial Cities, while the areas around Würzburg and Bamberg were ruled by the Church as a bishopric. There were also medium-sized principalities like Ansbach and Bayreuth, and small territories such as the County of Henneberg. In places, the next-door village had yet another lord with his own little territory. In Fürth even individual houses were assigned to one of three lords ("triumvirate"). The Franconian Circle failed repeatedly to secure the peace. The Grumbach Feud, which reached its climax with the attack by William of Grumbach on Würzburg, and the Second Margrave War were decided and settled by powers that did not belong to the Franconian Circle.

=== Reformation in Franconia ===
Franconia, and especially the mighty imperial city of Nuremberg, had an important role in the spread of the Reformation movement triggered by Martin Luther. Very early on, in the two churches in Nuremberg open posts were filled by people from the group around Luther. Important Nuremberg citizens, such as Anton Tucher and Albrecht Dürer, were in close contact with the Wittenberg Circle where Luther was based. The Luther Bible was printed in Nuremberg and was dispatched across the German-speaking world in huge numbers to become the standard German Bible. Most other Franconian imperial cities such as Rothenburg, Schweinfurt and Dinkelsbühl, followed soon after and held masses in German, established evangelical preachers or approved Protestant communion services. Coburg Land, then part of the Electorate of Saxony, was actually one of the main centres of the Reformation movement. Even many of the Franconian Imperial Knights became converts to the new faith and through it hoped to gain greater independence from the power of the princes. In addition to the Lutheranism, the Radical Reformation Baptist movement began to spread early on across Franconia. Important centres of Anabaptists were Königsberg and Nuremberg. Meanwhile, the Hohenzollern areas around Ansbach and Kulmbach initially remained Roman Catholic until George the Pious introduced the teachings of Luther. Even in the dioceses of Bamberg and Würzburg there were many followers of the Reformation movement, although these areas remained Catholic at their core.

=== Franconian War ===
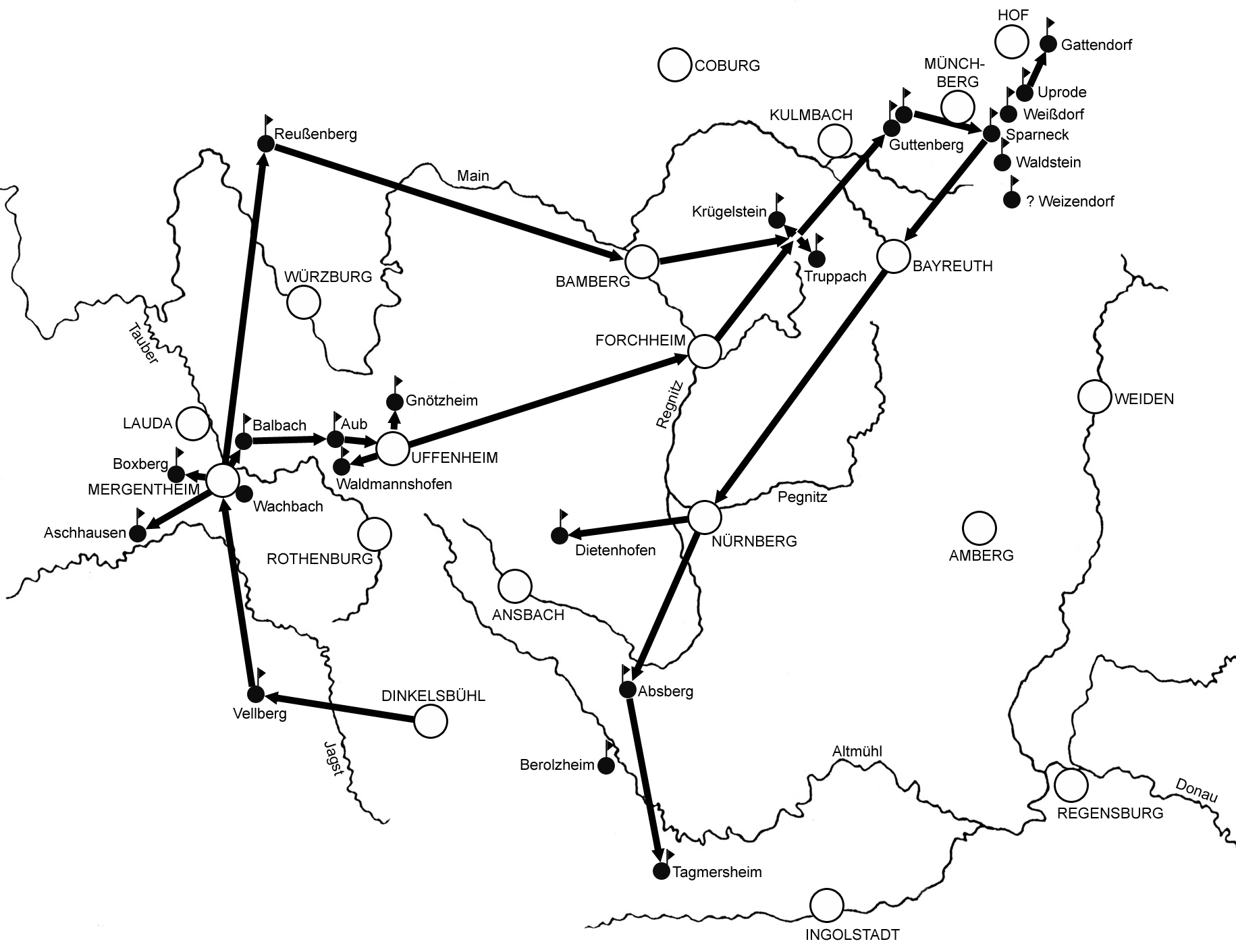
Route followed by the Army of the Swabian League

The notorious robber knight, Hans Thomas of Absberg, regularly kidnapped merchants and noblemen in the Franconian region. This resulted in the Emperor, Charles V outlawing Absberg by imposing the Imperial Ban. Following the kidnapping of Hans Lamparter of Greiffenstein, the Emperor's spokesman, and Johann Lucas, who handled financial business at the personal direction of the Emperor, Charles V secured the support of the Swabian League for a more targeted effort to defeat Absberg and the Franconian nobility that supported him. This led in 1523 to the Franconian War: after offering an amnesty to many of the knights, the Swabian League embarked on a military campaign against those who remained allied with Hans Thomas of Absberg and destroyed numerous castles, including Absburg and Boxberg, events portrayed in the wood carvings of war correspondent, Hans Wandereisen.

=== Peasants' War in Franconia ===
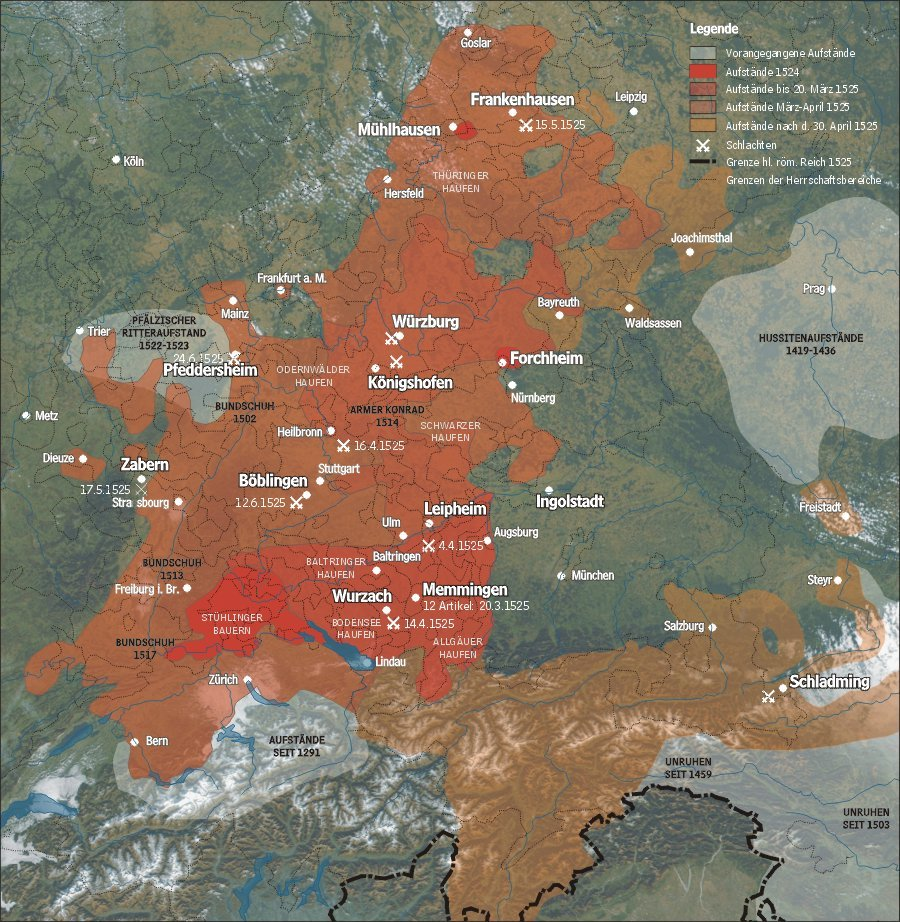
Spread of the uprisings in the Peasants' War

A combination of discontent due to increasing taxation and socage, new ideas of social liberty and the religious attractions of the Reformation movement, unleashed the German Peasants' War in 1525. First, farmers in Swabia demanded a say in the selection of their priests, the restoration of traditional rights, such as hunting and fishing, limitations on socage and fairer taxes. These demands also met with broad approval in large parts of Franconia. In mid-March, 1525, a radical peasant group of about 4,000 men called the Tauberhaufen, gathered in the villages around Rothenburg. Their leaders, who included Florian Geyer, declared that all men were equal before God and that serfdom was wrong. Further west, a similar group, the Odenwald Haufen was formed, led by Götz von Berlichingen. However, the rebellious peasants were unable to persuade any of the senior princes to make decisive changes and so they went on the rampage, attacking and plundering official buildings, stately homes and monasteries. In doing so they particularly targeted the tax rolls and interest books. The nobility initially gave in and the Count of Henneberg even provided the farmers with arms and food. At the same time they recruited experienced mercenaries in Italy, led by George, Steward of Waldburg known as "Farmer George" (Bauernjörg).

Soon the uprisings had spread and affected the bishoprics of Bamberg and Würzburg. In the Würzburg area numerous castles and monasteries were burned down. In contrast, the Nuremberg Land and the areas around Kulmbach were largely spared. At the end of April nearly 20,000 peasants assembled outside Würzburg, where the bishop had moved into Marienberg. The Wurzburg citizens, among whom Tilman Riemenschneider played an important role, allied themselves surprisingly with the farmers. But they were unable to capture the Marienburg fortress. As the princely mercenary army advanced with 3,000 horsemen and 9,000 Landsknecht infantry, the farmers under Götz von Berlichingen positioned themselves for battle at Lauda-Königshofen, but their situation in the face of well-equipped troops was hopeless. At the express command of the army, no prisoners were taken and by the evening of 4 June, 5,000 farmers lay dead on the battlefield. A further battle occurred near the town of Meiningen in the Bishopric of Würzburg between episcopal troops and the peasant mob known as the Bildhausen Haufen, in which the peasants were defeated. The victors went on to commit numerous mutilations and executions (including that of the priest at Meiningen). The peasants suffered heavy losses both in terms of life and crops. For centuries afterwards, the lower levels of society were excluded from political life as a result of this rebellion and threat to law and order.

=== Second Margrave War and Counter-Reformation ===
In 1552 Margrave Albert Alcibiades of Kulmbach-Bayreuth tried to break the supremacy of Nuremberg and to secularise the bishoprics. He attacked Bamberg and Würzburg and extorted money from Nuremberg. During the fighting large areas of Franconia were laid waste until King Ferdinand I with several dukes and princes agreed to overthrow Albert. In 1553 Albert's place of retreat, the Plassenburg, was captured and totally destroyed. His successors demanded high levels of compensation from the Imperial City of Nuremberg, which itself had suffered badly from this war.

In the wake of the Roman Catholic Counter-Reformation, Julius Echter in Würzburg and Neidhardt von Thüngen in Bamberg acted ruthlessly against the Protestant Circle of the two bishoprics. Lutheran priests were driven out and subjects offered the choice of leaving or converting. The power of the Protestant knighthood was broken. Following the Counter-Reformation in Franconia, the number of witch trials escalated.

=== Thirty Years' War ===
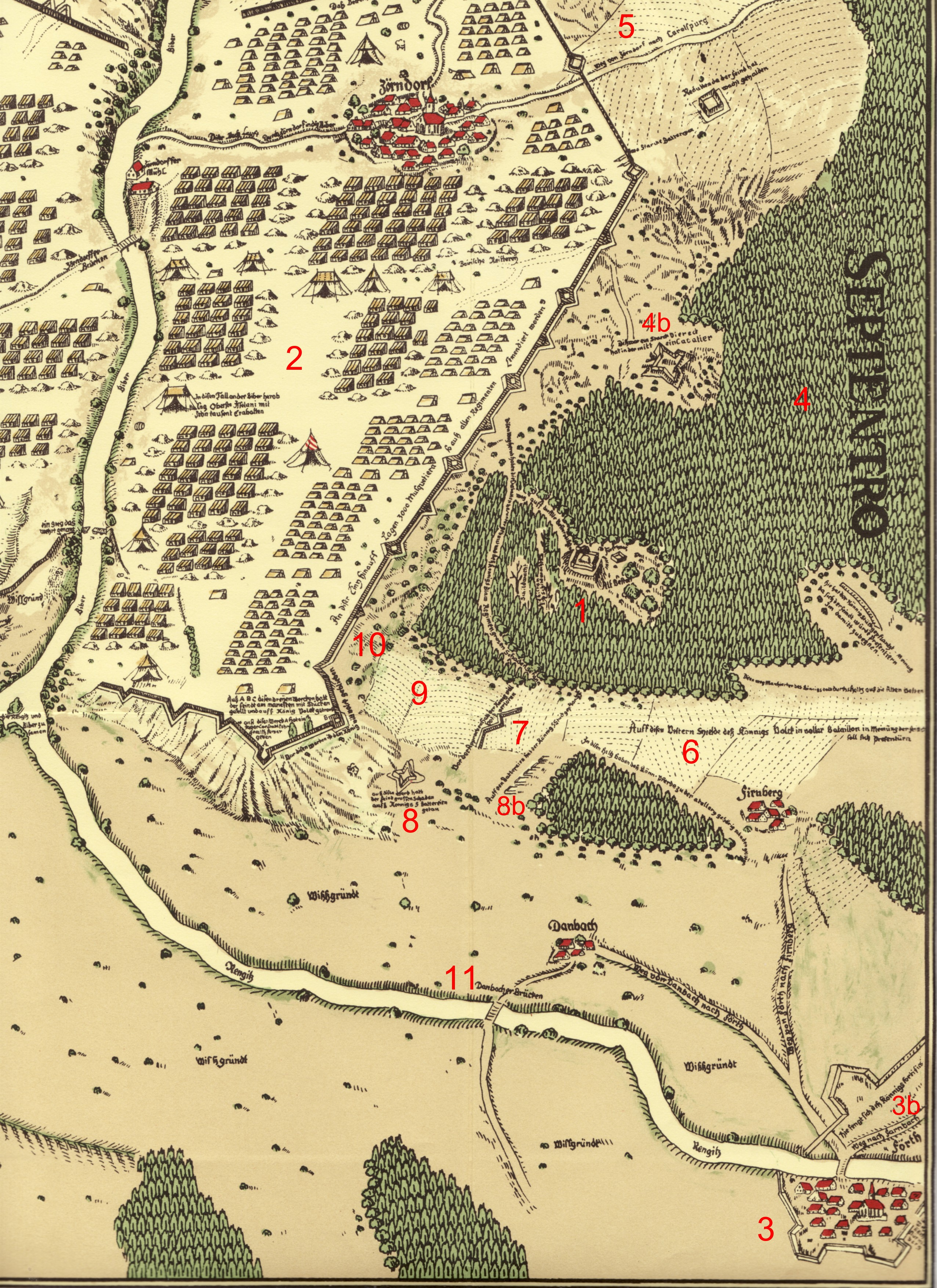
Part of Wallenstein's encampment around Zirndorf and the Alte Veste

In 1608 the territorial princes of the Empire that had adopted the Reformation formed a Protestant Union. In Franconia the margraves of Ansbach and Bayreuth and the Imperial Cities belonged to this military and political alliance. The Catholics responded in 1609 by forming a counter-alliance, the Catholic League, in which princes, especially the prelates, gathered themselves under Maximilian I of Bavaria. The antagonism between the two sides finally resulted in the Thirty Years' War, which began in Bohemia, but eventually spread to the whole Empire and to Europe.

Franconia itself was initially no immediate battleground, but due to its central location within the Empire it was frequently traversed by plundering armies. After the Battle of the White Hill in 1620, where the Catholic League were victorious, Emperor Ferdinand II began a comprehensive re-Catholicisation. The bishops of Franconia received back all the estates that they had lost since 1552. In connexion with this the Bishop of Wurzburg received Kitzingen, which hitherto had been enfeoffed to Brandenburg-Ansbach for centuries. After the Battle of Breitenfeld in September 1631 Swedish troops under Gustavus Adolphus advanced to Franconia. They invaded Würzburg and stormed Marienberg Fortress, hitherto thought to be impregnable. While many Imperial Knights welcomed the Swedish invasion, the majority of Protestant territorial princes and the Imperial Cities resisted. Only the Duke of Coburg switched immediately over to the Swedish side. Nuremberg concluded an alliance with Sweden under public pressure and supplied troops and cannon. When Wallenstein entered the war again, Gustavus Adolphus set up a huge camp around Nuremberg in summer 1632. Wallenstein took up position west of Nuremberg around Zirndorf, but did not allow himself to be lured onto the offensive. As a result, the Swedes started the Battle of the Alte Veste and suffered heavy losses. Two weeks later the Swedish king withdrew from Franconia and the theatre of war moved to central Germany. Nevertheless, for a further 16 years, Franconia was beset by raids, the quartering of troops, the passage of armies, the extortion of financial contributions and plague epidemics. When in 1648 the war was finally ended by the Peace of Westphalia, the confession boundaries were fixed as at the year 1624. The Franconian estates had to pay huge sums of money to Sweden as war compensation which, due to the depopulation and devastation of the region was scarcely possible. Half the population had died; in Coburg Land as many as 70 to 80 percent of the population had disappeared. In the Protestant areas after the war about 150,000 Protestant refugees were settled. Some were Austrian exiles and were accepted in great numbers by the Margrave of Ansbach, who settled them around Ansbach, Gunzenhausen and Wassertrüdingen. One year after the peace treaty there a subsequent peace congress took place in Nuremberg, the Nuremberg Peace Execution Day, at which remaining issues were resolved.

=== Incorporation of Franconia into new territories ===
Typical of the territorial lordship in Franconia continued to be the territorium non clausum (German: nichtabgeschlossenes Gebiet or "non-contiguous area"), i.e. princely territories that were not precisely delineated by a continuous geographical boundary. Instead territorial lordship in the region was often expressed through individual legal titles. So there were villages in which the land was owned by one lord, but jurisdiction exercised by another. An example of that is Fürth, where the Imperial City of Nuremberg, the Margrave of Ansbach and the Bishop of Bamberg all had sovereign rights. In the Principalities of Ansbach and Bayreuth this did not change until the late 18th century. In 1791, the last Margrave of Ansbach-Bayreuth, Charles Alexander, gave up his sovereign territory and transferred both principalities to Prussia. Immediately after this transfer of power the Prussian provincial governor (Provinzstatthalter), Hardenberg, secured sole dominion for Prussia in these areas with military force and thus forcibly replaced territorium clausum with Prussian national sovereignty. This created a relatively large state on the territory of the present day region of Franconia, giving a major power significant influence over the Franconian Circle and destroying its fragile balance of power, even though the Circle formally existed until the dissolution of the Holy Roman Empire in 1806.

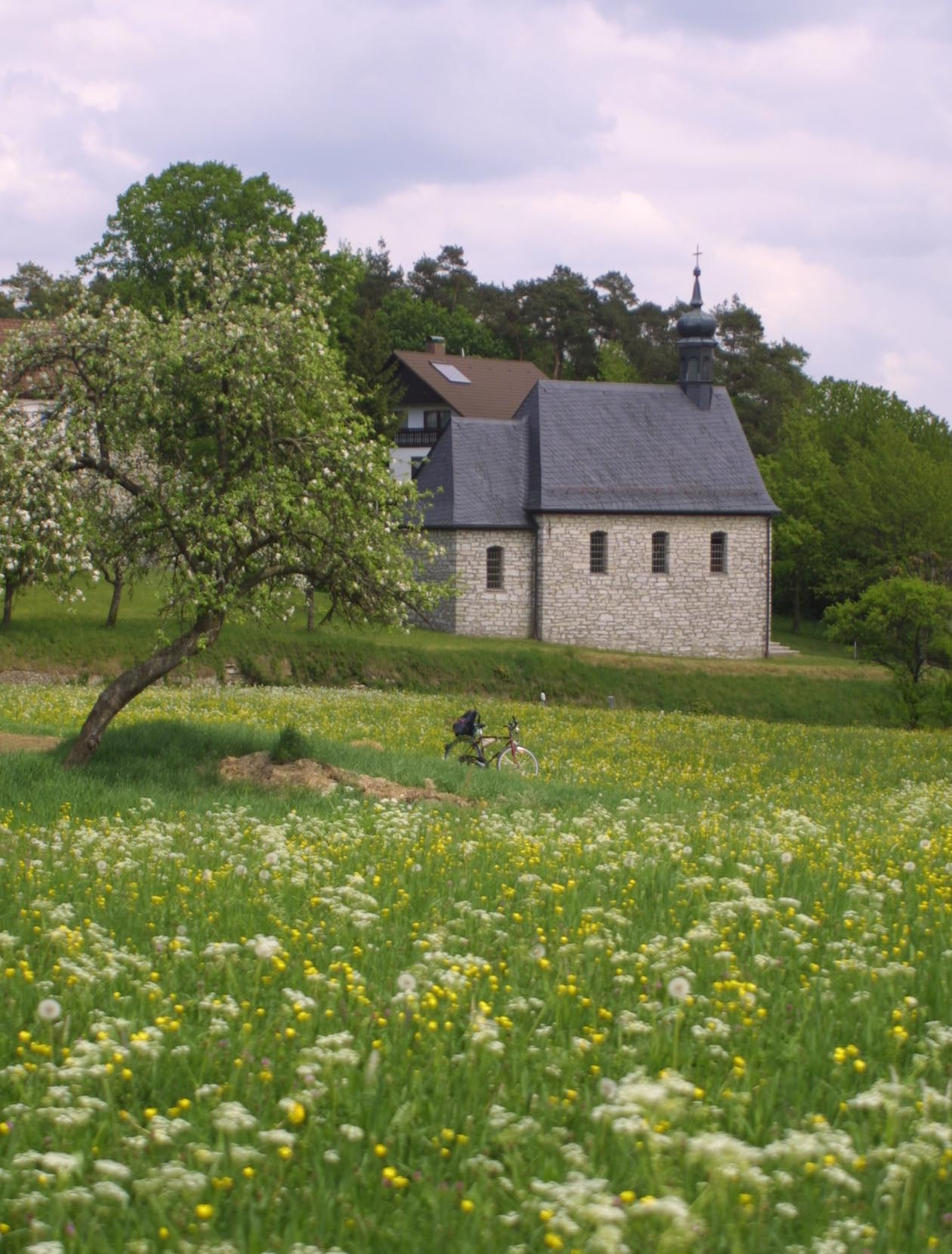
Franconian village church near Bamberg

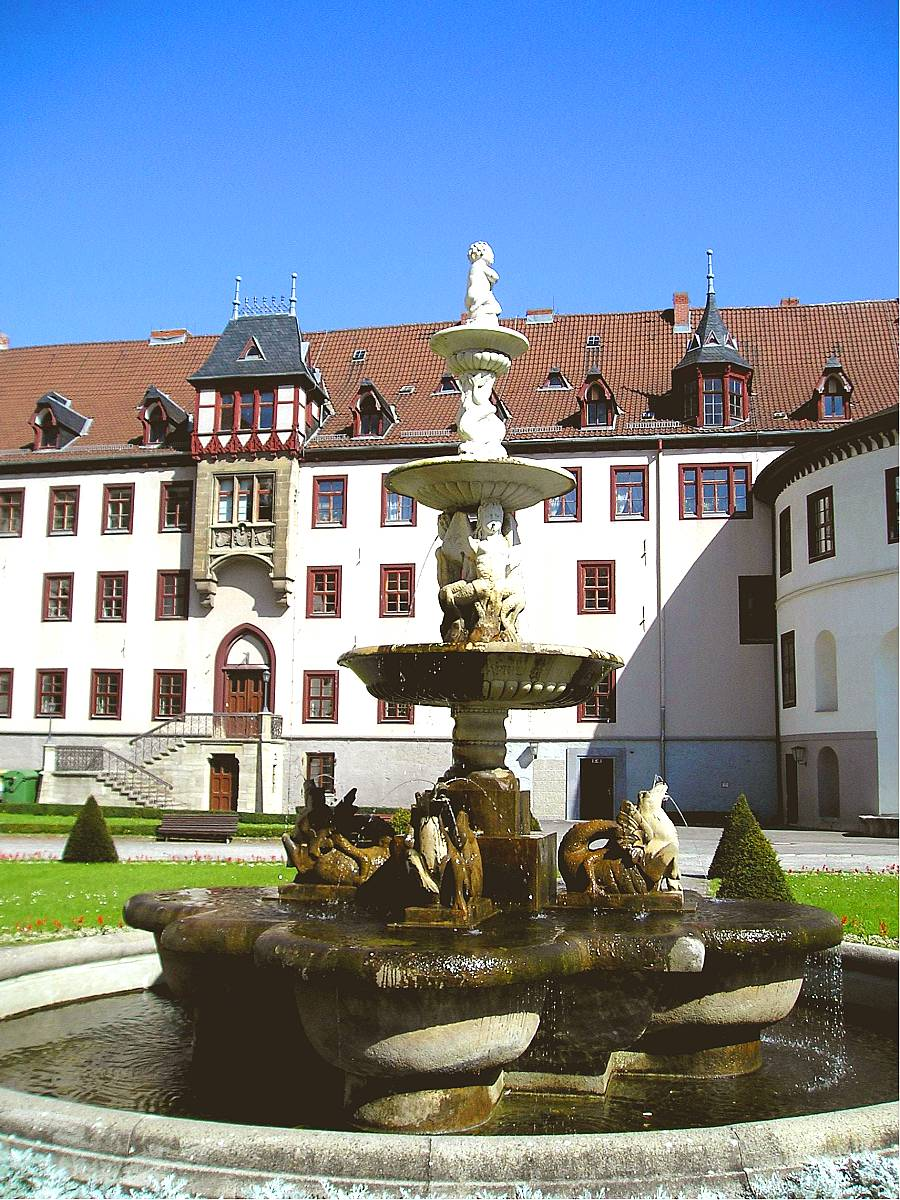
The Bibrasbau, an important part of Wurzburg Castle in Meiningen, built in 1511 by the Bishop of Würzburg Lorenz von Bibra, today part of Schloss Elisabethenburg

Overall, however, Franconia continued to be sharply politically as well as religiously divided. For example, the various states were divided into Roman Catholic or Protestant territories based on the Imperial legal principle of cuius regio, eius religio ("whose land, his religion").

This fragmentation and its status as a classical imperial landscape made Franconia in the early 19th century a bankruptcy asset and centre of disposal for the Old Empire following the Treaty of Lunéville. Under Napoleon's influence Bavaria, which he saw as a potential bulwark against Austria, was one of the winners among the southern German states. In 1803, parts of Franconia were occupied by the army of Electoral Bavaria. A few months later, the Reichsdeputationshauptschluss officially granted the bishoprics of Bamberg and Würzburg, the imperial cities of Weissenburg, Windheim, Rothenburg, Schweinfurt and the imperial villages of Gochsheim and Sennfeld near Schweinfurt to the Electorate of Bavaria, which had been previously linked historically and politically to Franconia. This represented the largest part of Franconia. But because Prussia retained possession of the principalities of Ansbach and Bayreuth it also had a large territorial presence in Franconia and sought to broadening its local power base. However, the Bishopric of Eichstätt went initially to Ferdinand III of Tuscany before falling to Bavaria two years later as a result of the Treaty of Pressburg; Grand Duke Ferdinand moving to Würzburg. In the Major State Border and Purification Compromise (Haupt-Landes-Grenz- und Purifikationsvergleich) of 1802 Bavaria and Prussia agreed, following the Reichsdeputationshauptschluss, an exchange of territory, which inter alia placed the town of Weissenburg under Prussian sovereignty with effect from 1803 before it returned to Bavarian ownership after Prussia's defeat in 1806.

Similarly, in 1806, Bavaria was able to exchange the Prussian Principality of Ansbach for the Duchy of Berg. The Treaty of the Confederation of the Rhine (Rheinbundakte) - again in 1806 - ended the independence of the city of Nuremberg and its incorporation into what was now the Kingdom of Bavaria. In 1803, in the so-called Rittersturm ("Knights' Assault"), the great territorial states of Bavaria, Württemberg and Baden also seized the little territories, often of just a few villages, belonging to the Imperial Knights and the Franconian nobility, although the Reichsdeputationshauptschluss had not mentioned them. The Rheinbundakte sanctioned these unilateral actions in Article 25. In 1810 Bavaria purchased the former Prussian Principality of Bayreuth, which had been French-owned since 1807, and thus finally drove Prussia as a major power out of the region. In 1805, in an exchange of land with Bavaria, the House of Habsburg secured for itself the territory of the former Bishopric of Würzburg as a foundation for its Tuscan side line, while Bavaria was compensated with the lands of the former Bishoprics of Eichstätt, Trient and Brixen and the County of Tyrol. Würzburg, with its capital city, was a short-lived electorate and, from 1806, formed the Grand Duchy of Wurzburg under Ferdinand III of Tuscany, which as a member of the Confederation of the Rhine (Rheinbund) – like Bavaria – was one of Napoleon's allies. Bavaria in turn exchanged the Würzburg area at the Congress of Vienna for the Habsburg territories right of the River Inn.

At the Congress of Vienna, Bavaria was also originally promised the Fulda and Electoral Mainz territories of Bad Brückenau and Aschaffenburg together with their surrounding areas that had historically belonged to the Upper Rhenish and Electoral Rhenish Circles and thus had never been part of Franconia (in the sense of the Franconian Circle). As part of the Bavarian administrative structure, these areas were allocated to the province of Lower Franconia and are now seen accordingly as Franconian.

In the Franconian territories there was, in places, considerable resentment towards any affiliation with Bavaria. These were intermingled with liberal demands for republican structures. The constitutional lawyer and Mayor of Würzburg, William Joseph Behr, was arrested for treason in 1832 when he declared before 6,000 people at the Gaibach Festival that Bavaria's was the worst constitution imaginable. In the spring of 1849 tensions escalated as the democratic opposition in Franconia demanded recognition of the decisions of the Constitution of St. Paul's Church and openly threatened the secession from Bavaria. In Würzburg and Miltenberg weapons caches were raided; in Schweinfurt six cannon and 1,100 rifles were counted at one meeting. The Franconian landed classes and bourgeoisie, as well as the churches and officials decided ultimately against violence and for a reconciliation with Munich. When Bavaria had become part of the German Empire in 1871, perspectives changed completely and antagonism between Franconia and Bayern eased significantly.

In 1920, the Free State of Coburg decided in a referendum against joining the state of Thuringia and went instead to Bavaria. Thanks to the Accession Treaty of 1920 with the Free State of Bavaria, Coburg enjoys certain administrative and cultural privileges. For example, Coburg is exempt from the authority of the Upper Franconian State Archive at Bamberg and has its own state archives. In Saxe-Meiningen, which then comprised about two-thirds of today's South Thuringia, there was no referendum on this question. There, the SPD-led parliament decided to join the new state of Thuringia. There were certainly loud protests against this move and, immediately after the establishment of the state of Thuringia, an "Out of Thuringia" (Los von Thüringen) movement was founded that was active until 1932. At that time, Schmalkalden, Suhl and Schleusingen belonged to Prussia until 1945 or 1947.

=== Nazi era ===
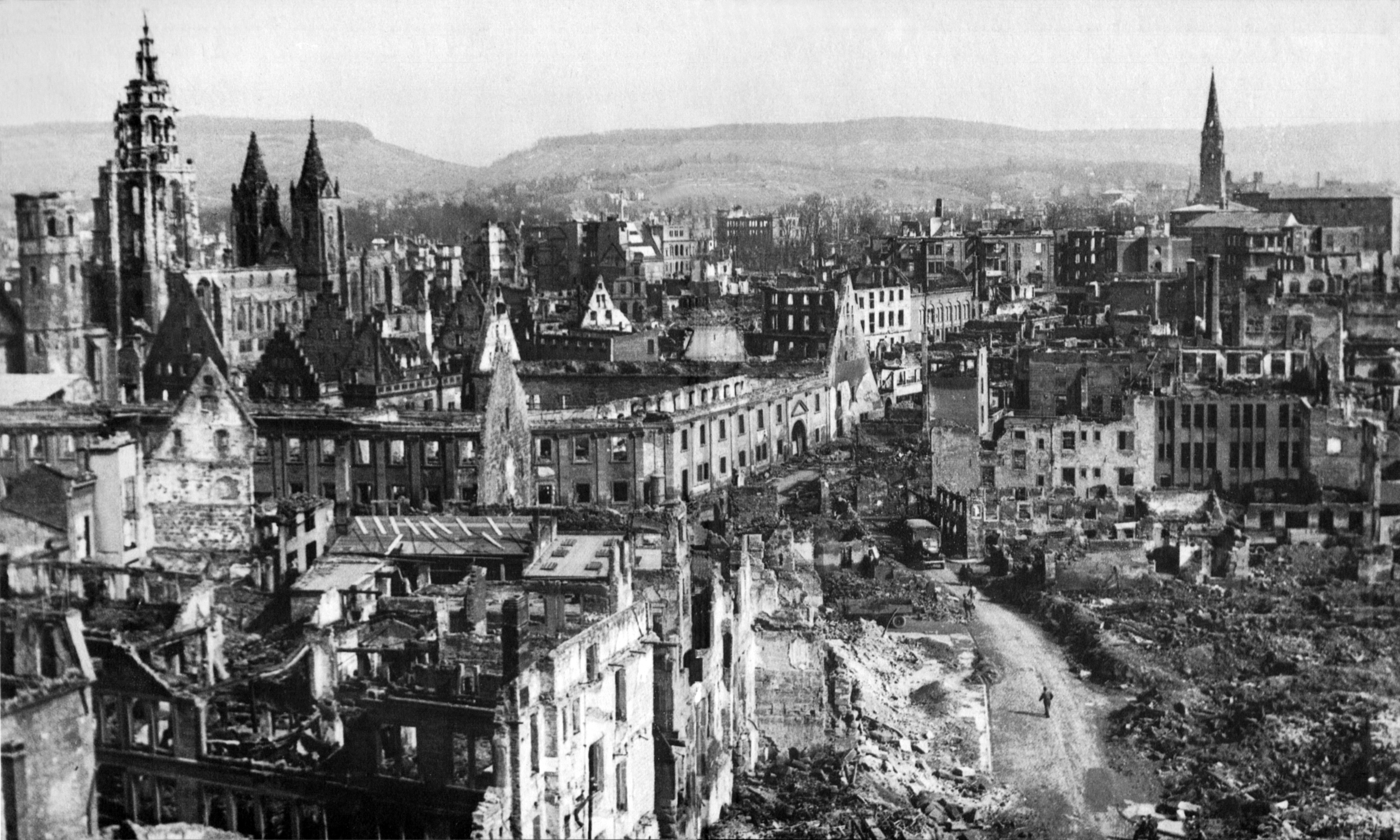
Heilbronn after its destruction

In the Nazi era parts of Franconia - the NSDAP Gaue of Main-Franconia (Mainfranken) and Franconia (Franken) were give their own party structures at the middle level of party government. By contrast, Upper Franconia, together with Lower Bavaria and Upper Palatinate, formed the Bavarian Ostmark (Bayerische Ostmark). The Protestant areas of Franconia had proved to be particularly receptive to National Socialism. The NSDAP won 83 per cent of the vote in Rothenburg Land in 1929, compared with only 32.9% for the rest of Bavaria. In Coburg town hall, the Nazi party governed with an absolute majority from 1929 under mayor, Franz Schwede, who later became Gauleiter of Pomerania. As the venue for Nuremberg Rallies, the city of Nuremberg played a prominent role in the self-expression of the Nazis who consciously fed the reminiscences and sentimentality of the city for its imperial past, by 'repatriating' the Imperial Crown. Gunzenhausen was one of the first cities in the Reich itself to openly discriminate against the Jewish population. It was there that the first Hitler Monument in the German Empire was erected in April 1933 and, on 25 March 1934, the first Jewish pogrom in Bavaria took place. The attack brought Gunzenhausen negative press coverage across the world. The political affiliation of Franconia to Bavaria and other states remained beyond questions during the Nazi era, however, but was inconsequential as a result of the Nazi policy of Gleichschaltung of the states.

Like all parts of the German Third Reich, Franconia was badly affected by Allied air raids. Nuremberg, as a major industrial centre and transport hub, was hit particularly hard. Between 1940 and 1945, the city was the target of dozens of air raids. Many other cities were also exposed to air raids. The Würzburg Residence was heavily damaged. The town of Bamberg, however, was almost completely spared. To protect cultural artefacts, the Historic Art Bunker was built below Nuremberg Castle where, among other things, the Imperial Regalia, the Cracow altarpiece, the Erdapfel and the Codex Manesse were kept. In the closing stages of the Second World War, at the end of March and April 1945, the Franconian towns and cities were captured by units of the US Army that had advanced from the west after the failure of the Battle of the Bulge and Operation Nordwind. The Battle of Nuremberg lasted five days and resulted in at least 901 deaths. The Battle of Crailsheim lasted 16 days and the Battle of Würzburg seven days. The Battle of Merkendorf lasted three days. The 7th United States Army took these strongholds.

=== Post-war era ===
==== Federal Republic of Germany ====
After the unconditional surrender of 8 May 1945 the Bavarian part of Franconia went into the American occupation zone while South Thuringia, with the exception of smaller enclaves like Ostheim, became part of the Soviet zone. Württemberg-Baden was also part of the American zone. In the autumn of 1945 the Bavarian Constitution came into force, founding the Free State of Bavaria. The state of Württemberg-Baden was founded on 19 September 1945. On 25 April 1952, this state merged with Baden and Württemberg-Hohenzollern ( both from the former French zone) to form the present state of Baden-Württemberg. On 1 December 1945, the state of Hesse was founded.

In addition to the reconstruction, Bavaria accepted more imperial Germans and refugees than any other German state. At the end of the Second World War, these dispossessed people streamed from Germany's former eastern territories as well as from Eastern and Southeastern Europe to Bavaria, since it had been conquered by American troops at the end of the war. Numerous refugee camps sprang up, such as the Wülzburg. In 1945, Bavaria and Baden-Württemberg shouldered the structural transformation of their land from a largely agriculturally-dominated region into a leading industrial region.

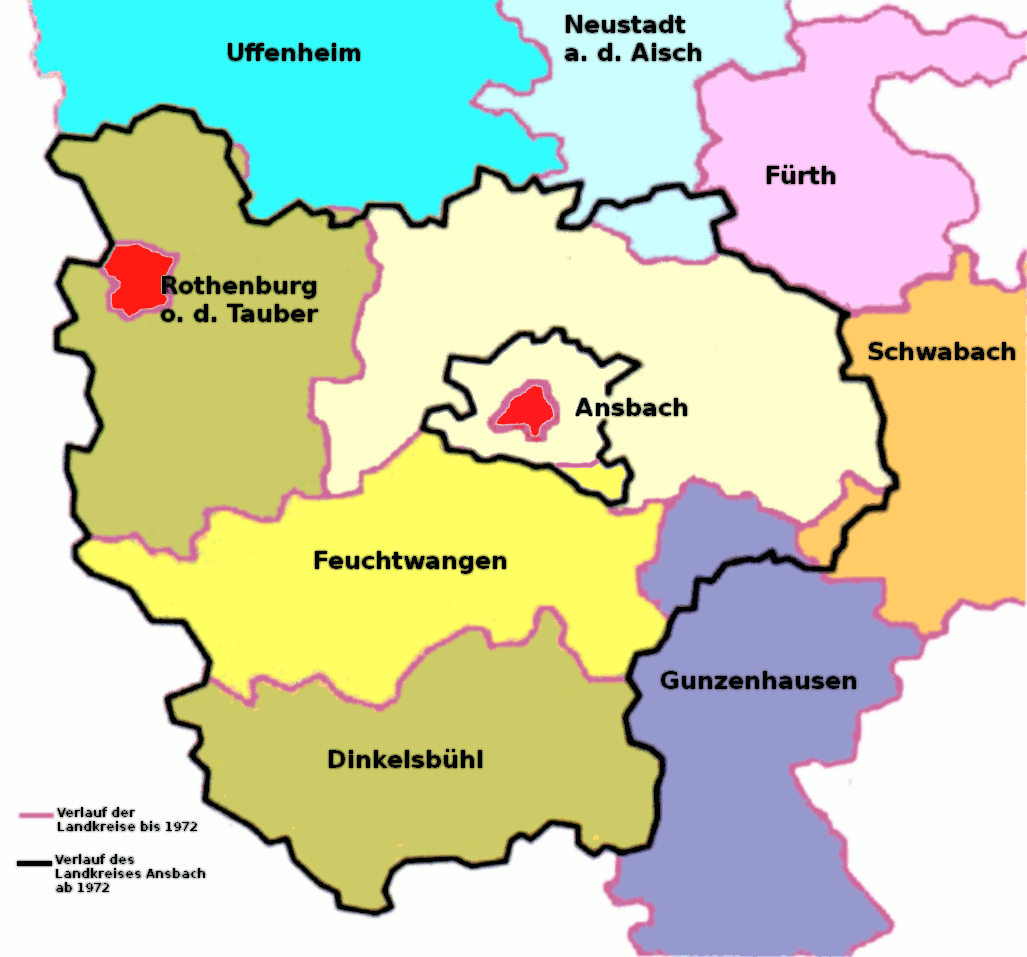
The municipal reform in Bavaria using the example of Franconia's county of Ansbach

In the years 1971 to 1980, a municipal reform in Bavaria was undertaken with the goal of creating more efficient municipalities and counties or districts. This was to be achieved by introducing larger administrative units (Gemeindefusion) which, in the opinion of the Bavarian government would operate more efficiently. Under sometimes major protests by the population, the number of municipalities was reduced by two thirds and the number of counties by about a half. The hitherto Middle Franconian county of Eichstätt went to the province of Upper Bavaria.

==== East Germany ====
The state of Thuringia, however, was restored in 1945 by the Soviet Military Administration in Germany and expanded in 1947, on the dissolution of Prussia, with Schmalkalden, Suhl and Schleusingen. On 7 October 1949, the German Democratic Republic (GDR) was founded, commonly known as East Germany. On 25 July 1952, in the course of administrative reform in East Germany, its Parliament passed the "Law on the Further Democratization of the Structure and Operation of the State Organs in Thuringia". Thus the state was relieved of its functions. From then on, it was run through the districts of Erfurt, Gera and Suhl. After Die Wende, the peaceful revolution in the GDR, the state of Thuringia was reinstated by the State Introduction Act of 22 July 1990 (effective 14 October 1990), eleven days after the German reunification, from the Bezirke of Erfurt, Gera and Suhl and the districts of Altenburg and Schmölln and Artern. Like its predecessor in the Weimar Republic, it was called the Free State of Thuringia. The Franconian part of today's state of Thuringia was then relatively closely coincident with the county of Suhl, popularly known as the "Autonomous Mountain Republic of Suhl".

Since 1990, the term South Thuringia has been very well established. The Franconian history of the region south of the Rennsteig had ceased to be taught or was only very sketchily taught in schools since the 1960s. Today, the region's residents identify themselves mainly with Thuringia. This is markedly different from the present situation of Franconia in Bavaria and Baden-Württemberg. However, in southern Thuringia, knowledge of its linguistic links to Franconia has been fairly widespread. In those areas that were heavily affected by the exclusion zone around the old Inner German Border - the districts of Sonneberg and Hildburghausen the inhabitants were constantly confronted with their broken links to Upper Bavaria and Lower Franconia, which anchored and heightened their sense of belonging to Franconia across the border. This becomes clear, for example, in the close cooperation between the districts of Sonneberg and Hildburghausen with Coburg after Die Wende, in the fields of culture and tourism, and even by Sonnenberg's membership of the Nuremberg Metropolitan Region.

== Literature ==
- Werner K. Blessing, Dieter Weiß (eds.): Franken. Vorstellung und Wirklichkeit in der Geschichte, (= Franconia. Supplements to the Yearbook for Franconian State Research, Vol. 1), Neustadt (Aisch), 2003.
- Jürgen Petersohn: Franken im Mittelalter. Identität und Profil im Spiegel von Bewußtsein und Vorstellung (Vorträge und Forschungen, Sonderband 51), Ostfildern, 2008 (cf. the review).
- Michael Peters: Geschichte Frankens. Vom Ausgang der Antike bis zum Ende des Alten Reiches. Katz Verlag, 2007. ISBN 978-3-938047-31-6 (cf. the review).
- Conrad Scherzer: Franken, Land, Volk, Geschichte und Wirtschaft. Nürnberg: Verlag Nürnberger Presse Drexel, Merkel & Co., 1955, 489 pp., IDN: 451342119.
- Martin Bötzinger: Leben und Leiden während des Dreißigjährigen Krieges in Thüringen und Franken, Langensalza, ²1997. ISBN 3-929000-39-3.
- Reinhold Andert: Der fränkische Reiter, Dingsda-Verlag Querfurt, Leipzig, 2006, ISBN 3-928498-92-4.
- Ada Stützel: 100 berühmte Franken. Sutton Verlag, Erfurt, 2007, ISBN 978-3-86680-118-9.
- Wolfgang Wüst (ed.): Frankens Städte und Territorien als Kulturdrehscheibe. Kommunikation in der Mitte Deutschlands. Interdisciplinary Conference from 29 to 30 September 2006 in Weißenburg i. Bayern (Middle Franconian Studies 19) Ansbach, 2008, ISBN 978-3-87707-713-9.
- Anna Schiener: Kleine Geschichte Frankens. Verlag Friedrich Pustet, Regensburg, 2008. ISBN 978-3-7917-2131-6.
