= Reisberg (Scheßlitz) =

Mountain in Bavaria, Germany

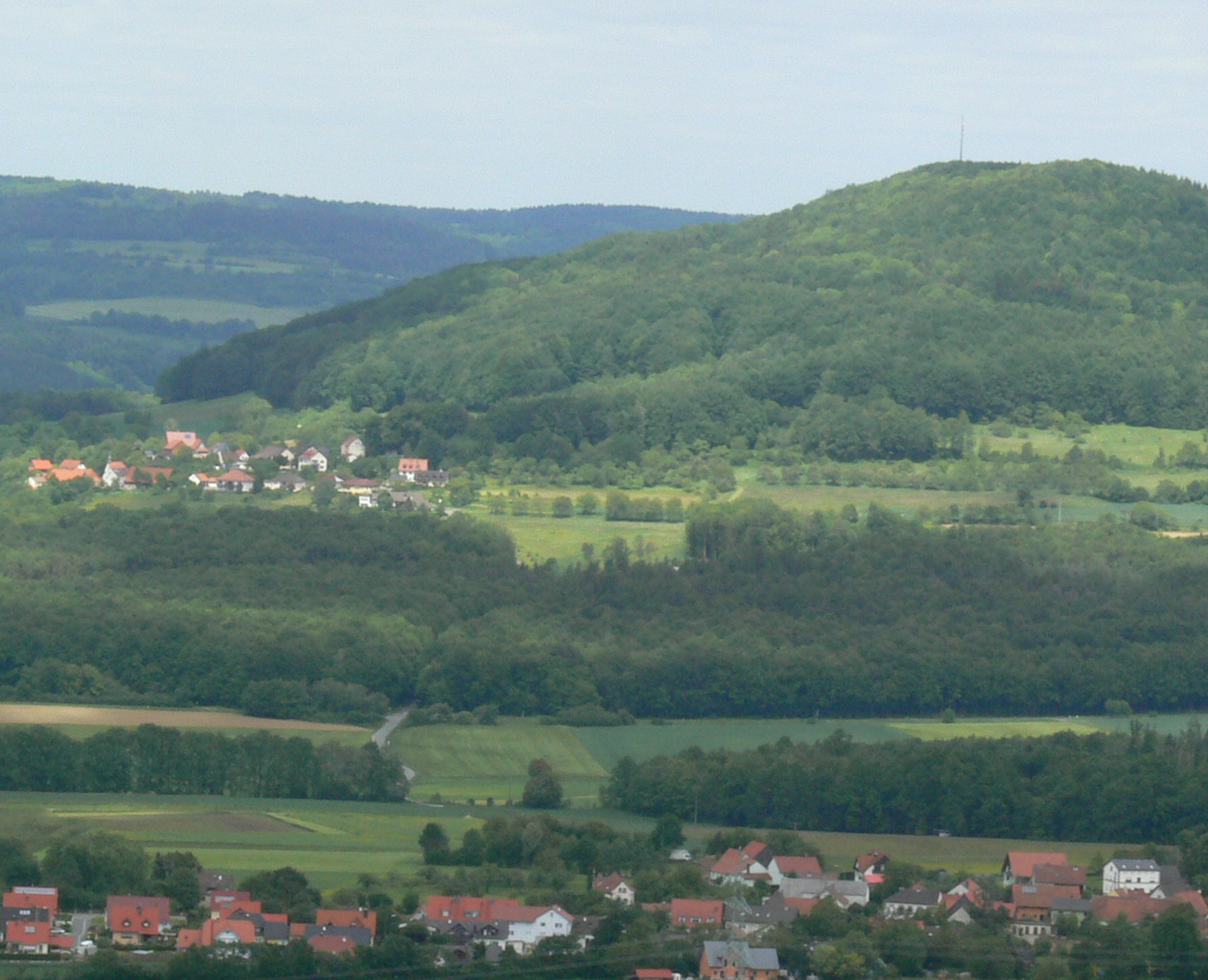
- The Reisberg

Highest point
- Elevation: 553.9 m (1,817 ft)
- Coordinates: 49°59′18″N 11°04′05″E

Geography
- Location within Bavaria
- Location: Bavaria, Germany

The Reisberg is a hill in Bavaria, Germany.
