= South Thuringia =

Southern region of the German state of Thuringia

South Thuringia (German: Südthüringen) refers to all areas of Franconia within the German state of Thuringia south of the Rennsteig and the Salzbogen, but including the entire former county of Bad Salzungen. The region is, if the Eisenach area is excluded, almost identical with the Southwest Thuringian Planning Region (Planungsregion Südwestthüringen) in the state of Thuringia.

The Rennsteig is a historical border road, that marked the boundary between the Duchy of Franconia and the Thuringian-Saxon sovereign territory, and today still represents the language boundary between the Main-Franconian dialects and the Thuringian-Upper Saxon language area of Thuringia.

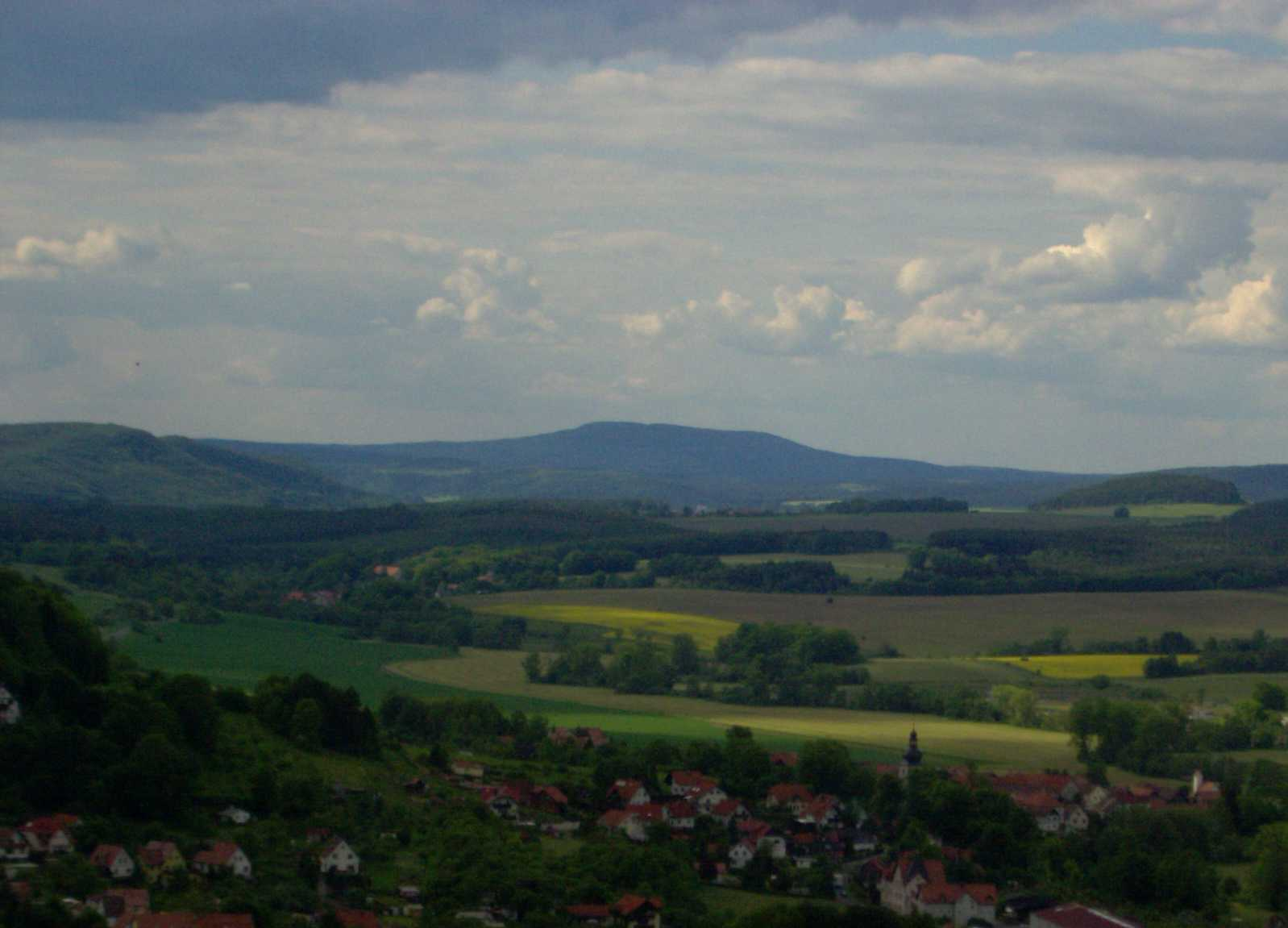
The Dolmar near Kühndorf, Christes and Metzels in the county of Schmalkalden-Meiningen, between the Central Upland mountains of the Rhön and Thuringian Forest

== Literature ==
- Zwischen Rennsteig und Sonneberg. Edition no. 1 Akademie-Verlag Berlin, Berlin 1986 (Werte unserer Heimat. Vol. 39). p. 27–31.
