= Menosgada =

Iron Age Celtic settlement

Coordinates: 50.092222°N 11.024722°E

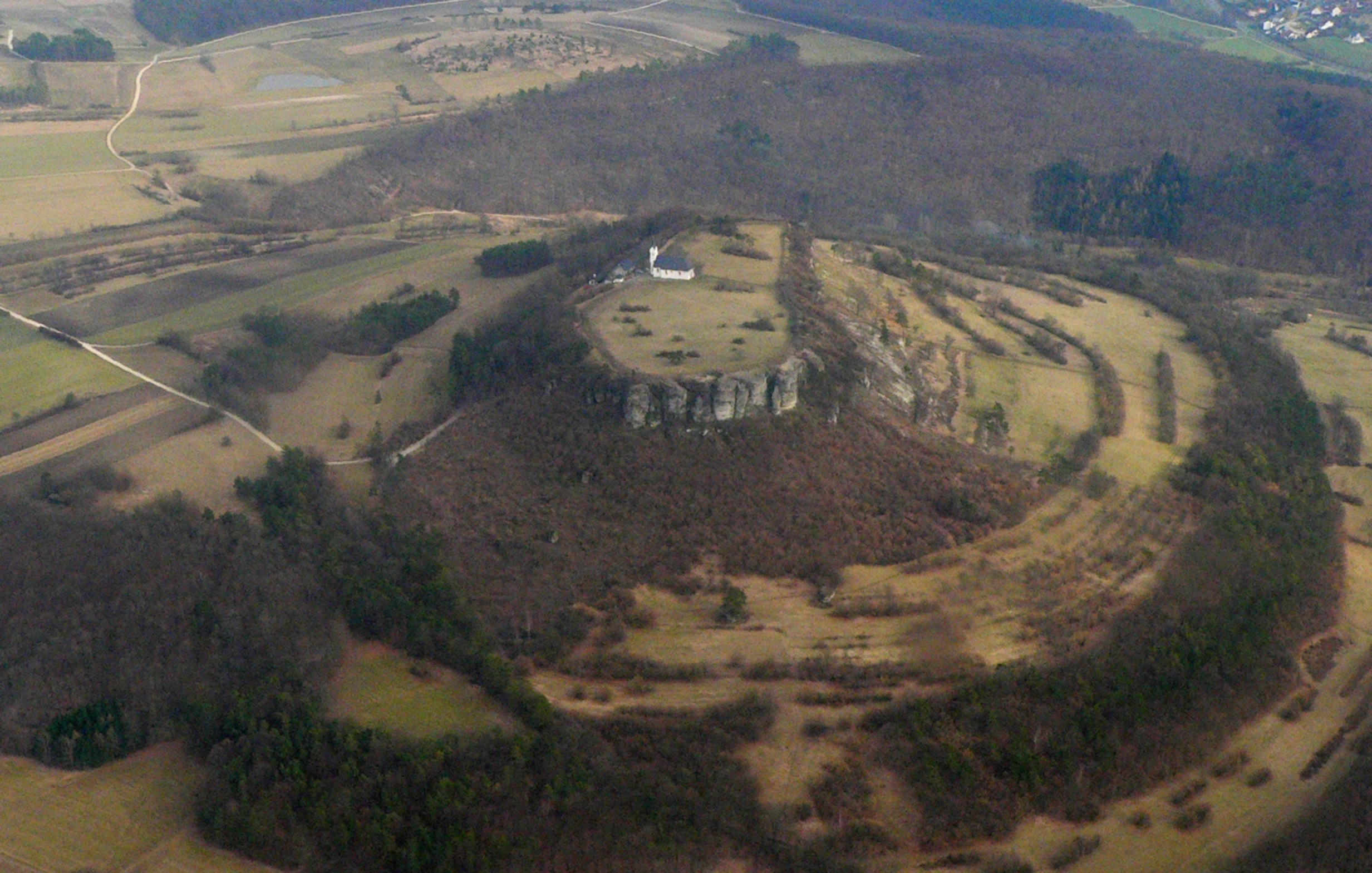
Site of the Menosgada oppidum.

Menosgada ("town above the Main valley") was a Celtic metropolis on the Upper Main (river) that was mentioned by the Greek geographer, Ptolemy. It was probably located on the hill known today as the Staffelberg.

In the 1st millennium BC, Celts settled on the Staffelberg. Around 200 BC, the simple Early Celtic fortification was expanded into an oppidum, covering an area of 49 hectares, that was protected by a 2,800-metre-long defensive wall and ditch against the inhabitants of the neighbouring Jura lands. Menosgada was the northernmost oppidum in Bavaria. In the centre of the site is an acropolis measuring 3 hectares in area.

Menosgada met its demise around 50 BC when the Romans tried unsuccessfully to advance eastwards along the Main graben to the Elbe river, but ran into massive opposition from the Germanic tribes. The times were too turbulent, and the site was abandoned by its inhabitants. In 50 AD, Menosgada was at the northernmost point of the area occupied by the Varisci. The immediate area was settled later after the Migration Period.

== Gallery ==
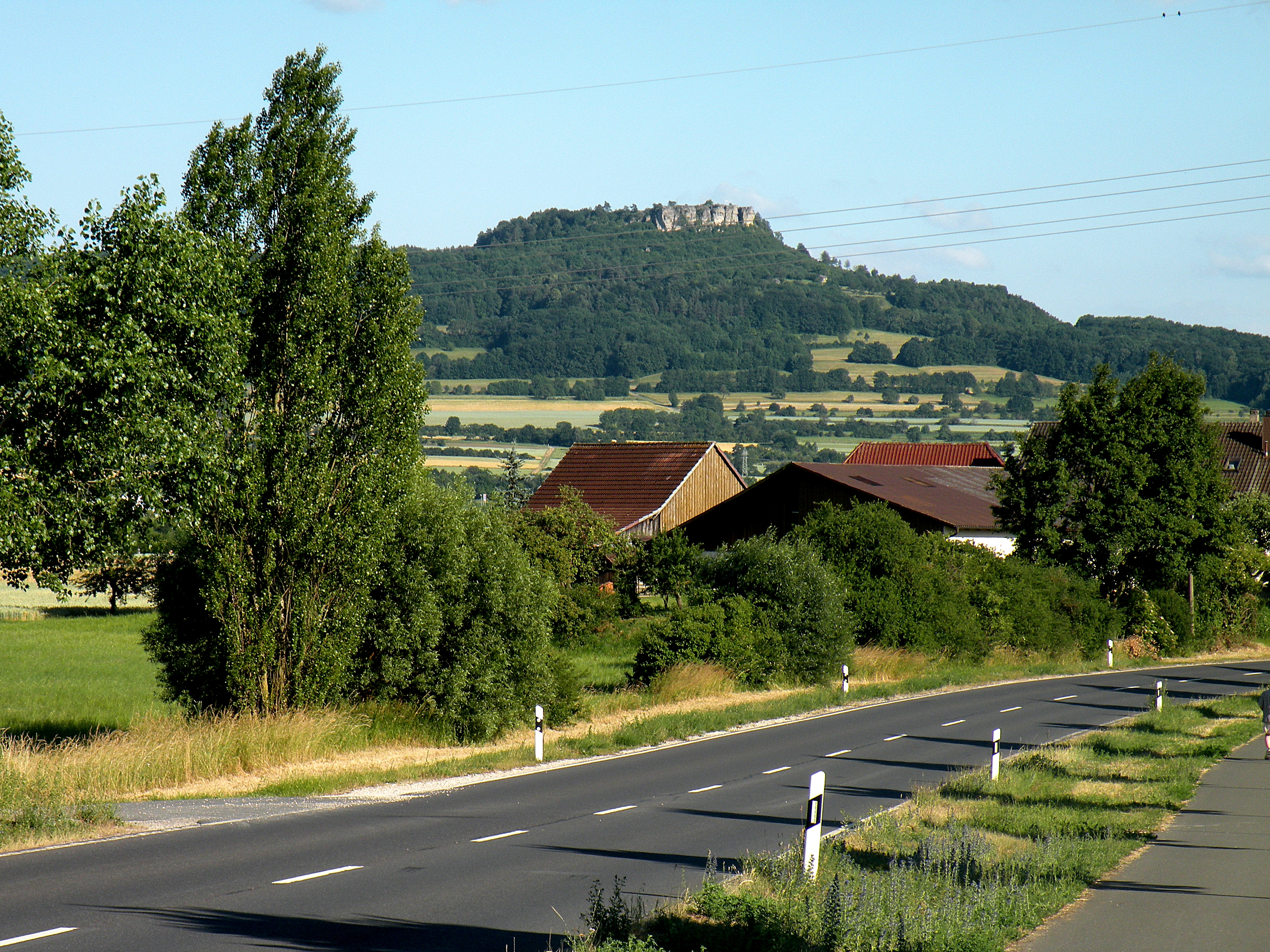
View of the Staffelberg

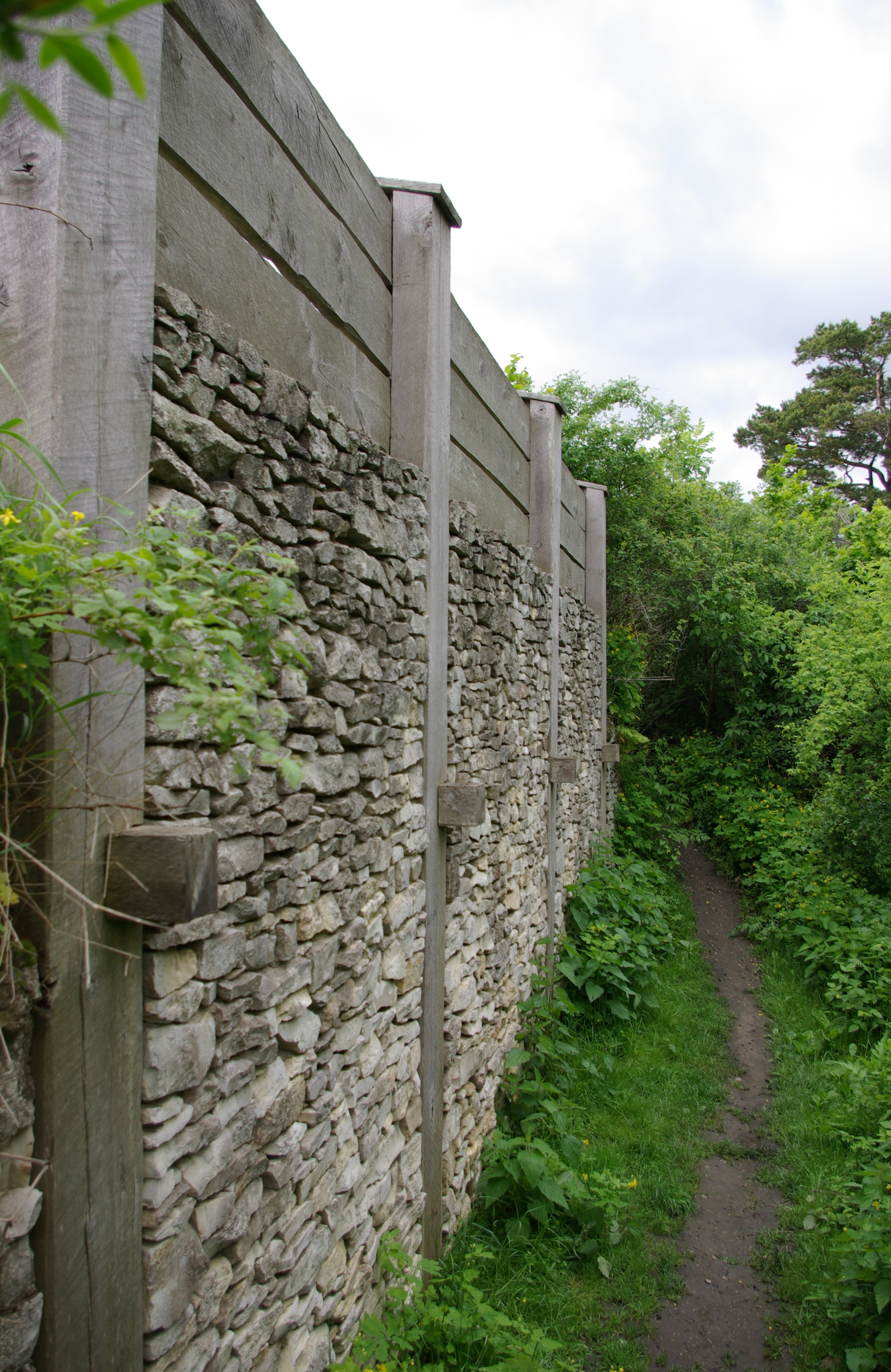
Reconstruction of a Celtic Pfostenschlitzmauer on the Staffelberg, 2010

== Literature ==
- Josef Motschmann: Altenkunstadt - Heimat zwischen Kordigast und Main. Gemeinde Altenkunstadt, Altenkunstadt, 2006
- Jörg W. E. Fassbinder, Florian Becker, Sarah Abandowitz: Vom Datenpuzzle zum Gesamtbild: das latènezeitliche Oppidum Menosgada auf dem Staffelberg, München, 2018
- Markus Schußmann: Menosgada: Die keltische Stadt auf dem Staffelberg, Regensburg, 2022
