= Staffelberg =

Mountain in Germany

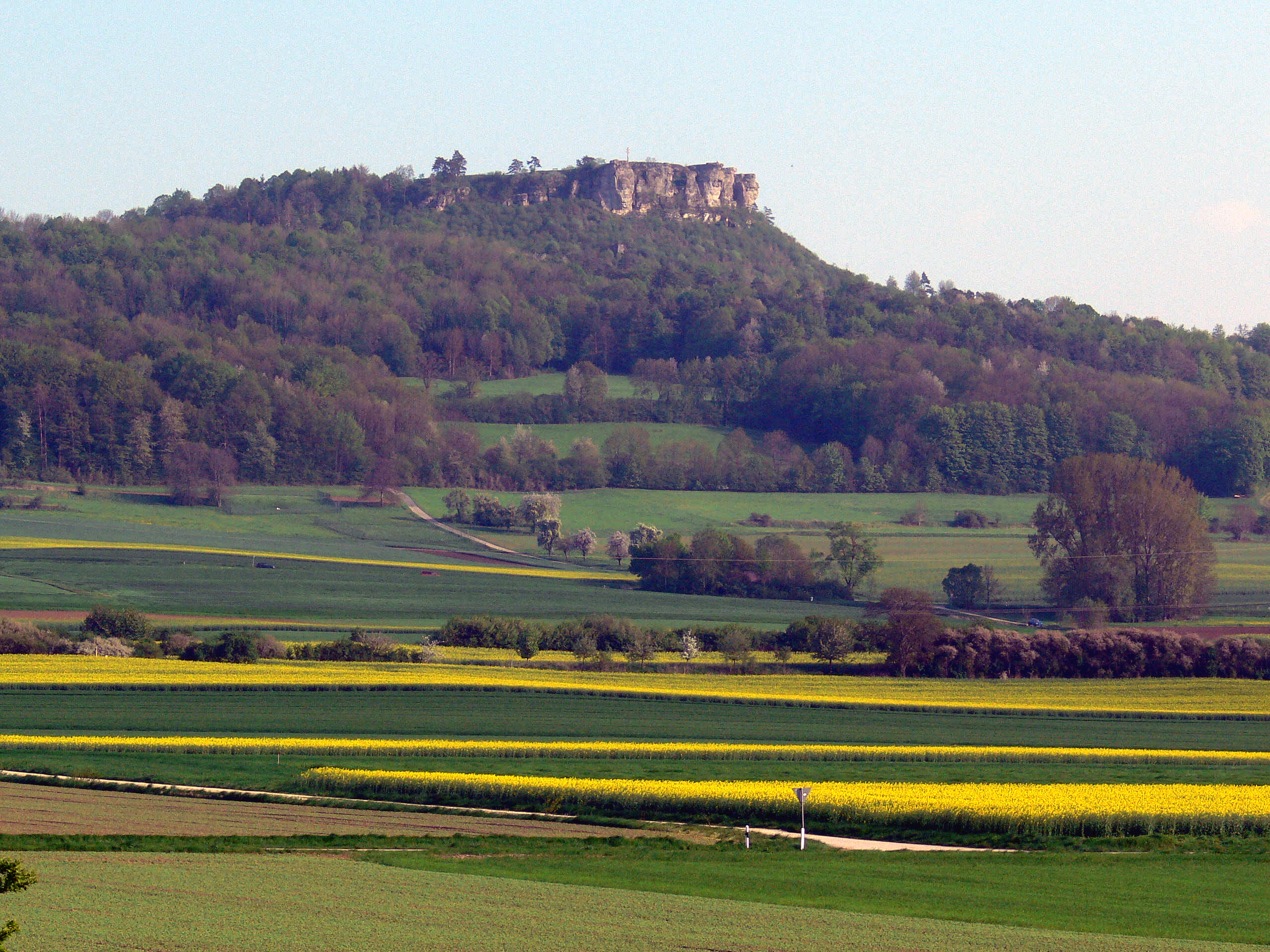

Highest point
- Elevation: 539 m (1,768 ft)
- Coordinates: 50°05′32″N 11°01′29″E

Geography
- Location within Bavaria
- Location: Bavaria, Franconia, Lichtenfels (district), Germany

The Staffelberg is a hill in Bavaria, Germany. It is part of the Franconian Switzerland and one of the most important landmarks in Franconia. First settlements date from the Neolithic. Romans, Celts and Franconians followed. During the La Tène period the Celtic oppidum of Menosgada was built on the plateau of the Staffelberg.

Nowadays, it is a famous tourist attraction – not only because of the view over the Main valley. The Staffelberg is located close to Vierzehnheiligen and the district capital of Lichtenfels. At the foot of the hill lies the town of Bad Staffelstein.

On the peak of the hill there is a little chapel (Adelgundiskapelle) and a restaurant. The entire hill is protected by environmental laws.
