= Biriciana =

Former Roman ala castellum in Weißenburg, Germany

Weissenburg Roman Fort (Kastell Weißenburg)
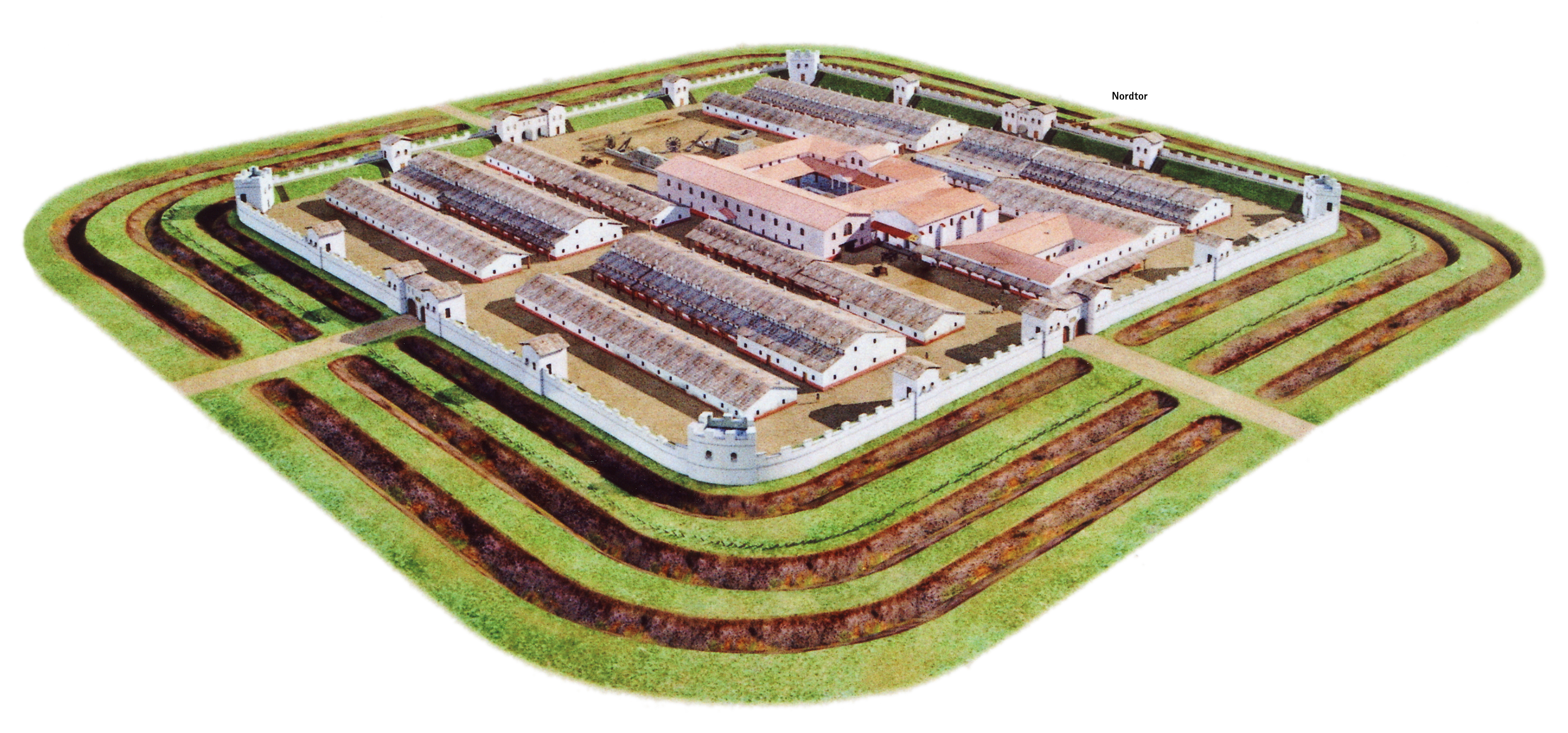
- Artist's impression of the camp. Some details are speculative.
- Alternative name: Biriciana
- Limes: ORL 72 (RLK)
- Section (RLK): Rhaetian Limes, Section 14
- Date(s) occupied: around 90 A. D. up to 253 A. D.
- Unit/Formation: Ala I Hispanorum Auriana
- Size: a) ca. 2.8 ha b) 3.1 ha
- Construction: a) wood and earth b) rock
- Condition: Parts of the outer defences were lightly walled in places and have visibly survived. The North Gate has been reconstructed. the subterranean interior building structures are marked by stones on the terrain.
- Location: Weißenburg in Bayern
- Coordinates: 49.03083°N 10.96250°E
- Height: 415 m
- Previous fort: ORL 71a Kastell Theilenhofen (west), Kastell Ellingen (north)
- Following fort: Kastell Oberhochstatt (east); Burgus Burgsalach (east)
- Fort behind: Kastell Munningen (west-southwest); Kastell Faimingen (southwest); Kastell Pfünz (southeast)
- Fort in front: Kleinkastell Gündersbach (north)

The Roman fort at Weissenburg (German: Kastell Weißenburg), called Biriciana in ancient times, is a former Roman ala castellum, which is a UNESCO World Heritage Site located near the Upper Germanic-Rhaetian Limes. It lies in the borough of Weißenburg in the Middle Franconian county of Weißenburg-Gunzenhausen in Germany. Today the castellum is one of the most important sites of research in the Roman limes in Germany. The site contains partly subterranean building remains, a reconstructed north gateway, large thermal baths and a Roman Museum with an integrated Limes Information Centre.

== Literature ==
- Dietwulf Baatz: Der Römische Limes. Archäologische Ausflüge zwischen Rhein und Donau. 4th edn. Gebr. Mann, Berlin, 2000, ISBN 3-7861-2347-0, pp. 289 ff.
- Wilhelm von Christ: Das römische Militärdiplom von Weissenburg. Franz, Munich, 1868.
- Wolfgang Czysz et al.: Die Römer in Bayern. Nikol, Hamburg 2005, ISBN 3-937872-11-6
- Thomas Fischer and Günter Ulbert: Der Limes in Bayern. Von Dinkelsbühl bis Eining. Theiss, Stuttgart, 1983, ISBN 3-8062-0351-2
- Ernst Fabricius, Felix Hettner and Oscar von Sarwey (eds.): Der Obergermanisch-Raetische Limes des Römerreiches. Abt. A, Bd. 7, Strecke 14: Der raetische Limes von Gunzenhausen bis Kipfenberg. Berlin, 1927.
- Eveline Grönke: Das römische Alenkastell Biricianae in Weißenburg in Bayern. Die Grabungen von 1890 bis 1990. (Limesforschungen, Bd. 25). Zabern, Mainz, 1997, ISBN 3-8053-2318-2
- Eveline Grönke, Edgar Weinlich: Die Nordfront des römischen Kastells Biriciana-Weissenburg: Die Ausgrabungen 1986/1987. Prähistorischen Staatssammlung München, Laßleben, Kallmünz, 1991. ISBN 3-7847-5125-3.
- Ute Jäger: Römisches Weißenburg. Kastell Biriciana, Große Thermen, Römermuseum. Keller, Treuchtlingen/Berlin, 2006, ISBN 3-934145-40-X
- Hans-Jörg Kellner: Der römische Schatzfund von Weißenburg. 3. erweiterte Auflage. Schnell & Steiner, Regensburg, 1997, ISBN 3-7954-1104-1
- Hans-Jörg Kellner, Gisela Zahlhaas, mit Beiträgen von Hans-Gert Bachmann, Claus-Michael Hüssen, Harald Koschik, Zsolt Visy und Ulrich Zwicker: Der römische Tempelschatz von Weissenburg i. Bay., von Zabern, Mainz, 1993, ISBN 3-8053-1513-9.
- Martin Pietsch, Jörg Faßbinder, Ludwig Fuchs: Mehr Tiefenschärfe durch Magnetik: Der neue Plan des Kastells Weißenburg. In: Das Archäologische Jahr in Bayern 2006. Stuttgart, 2007, pp. 98–101.
- W. Kohl, J. Tröltsch, J. Jacobs, W. Barthel and Ernst Fabricius: Der obergermanisch-raetische Limes des Roemerreiches. Abt. B, Bd. 7, Nr. 72: Kastell Weißenburg. Berlin, 1906.
- Johann Schrenk und Werner Mühlhäußer: Land am Limes. Auf den Spuren der Römer in der Region Hesselberg – Gunzenhausen – Weißenburg. Schrenk, Gunzenhausen, 2009, ISBN 978-3-924270-57-5, esp. pp. 107–114.
- Ludwig Wamser: Biriciana – Weißenburg zur Römerzeit. 2nd edn. Theiss, Stuttgart, 1986. (Guide to Archaeological Monuments in Bavaria: Franconia 1), ISBN 3-8062-0323-7
