= Uwe Behrendt =

German far-right extremist

- Born: 1 April 1952; Pößneck, Thuringia German Democratic Republic (East Germany)
- Died: 16 September 1981, allegedly by suicide; probably at or near the “Bir Hassan” PLO training camp near Beirut in Lebanon
- Education: Ilmenau University of Technology; University of Tübingen
- Occupations: Far-right extremist WSG deputy leader Arms dealer
- Known for: His alleged role in the double murder of Shlomo Lewin and Frida Poeschke along with the many questions surrounding it which remain unanswered more than forty years later.

Uwe Behrendt (April 1952 – September 1981) was a German far-right extremist. In 1976 he became de facto deputy leader of the "Wehrsportgruppe Hoffmann" (WSG-Hoffmann), a network of between 400 and 600 politically like-minded activists and terrorists (according to the perspective of the commentator) which concealed its underlying mission, rather unconvincingly, by presenting itself as a paramilitary sports club. Behrendt was widely considered as the group member closest in terms of (informal) seniority and personal support to the leader, Karl-Heinz Hoffmann. He came to wider attention because of a notorious double murder and questions posed by the subsequent handling of it when, on 19 December 1980, believed to have been motivated by antisemitic race-based hatred, Behrendt murdered a rabbi-publisher (and known anti-fascist) called Shlomo Lewin and Lewin's life-partner, Frida Poeschke in Erlangen. From the perspective of the German legal system, no one was ever convicted in connection with the murder. Behrendt was able to escape to Lebanon where, following further controversy involving allegations of torture and more killing, he is believed to have committed suicide in 1981.

Because evidence was never proven in a court of law that Hoffmann had either mandated the killing or had any prior knowledge of it, Behrendt is classified in public records as a lone killer. Following research undertaken during the intervening four decades by investigative journalists and specialist scholars it has nevertheless become accepted in some quarters that Uwe Behrendt was part of a network of far-right terrorists who were involved in violent attacks and killings in a number of European countries at the time.

== Life ==
=== Provenance and early years ===
Uwe Behrendt was born in Pößneck, a small town in the hill country south of Jena. It was here, in the recently launched Soviet-sponsored German Democratic Republic (East Germany) that he spent his childhood and in 1970 passed his school final exams, after which he embarked on an apprenticeship in the agriculture sector. However, following the usual break for a period of military service, he returned not to an agricultural education but to study for a degree in Electro-technology at the Ilmenau University of Technology. He remained dissatisfied with his life, however, and by 1973 was ready to escape from the country. Escaping to the west had become a feature of life in East Germany and was known as Republikflucht: it had become progressively more firmly stigmatized by the authorities through the 1950s. By 1961 “Republikflucht” had become extremely difficult, and was treated, under most circumstances as a criminal offence. Behrendt's flight attempt failed and the Czechoslovak authorities returned him to East Germany after a few weeks: he was then sentenced to a 20-month jail term. It was during 1974 that Behrendt was “sold” by the East German government to the West German government for 50,000 (western) marks under the still highly secret ”Häftlingsfreikauf” programme, under the terms of which East German political prisoners could be selected by the East German authorities for release to the west. West Germany received young people identified by agreement as “political prisoners” and East Germany received large amounts of western currency, of which there was a desperate shortage east of the Iron Curtain. The programme was applied, almost exclusively, to people of working age. The slaughter of war had left both versions of Germany desperately short of working age population, and for the former Soviet occupation zone the problem had been exacerbated by the several million “East Germans” who had fled to the west before the authorities moved first to discourage and then to prevent the practice. On 24 July 1974 Behrendt was delivered by bus with a number of others picked out for the same process to West Berlin. Several of those handed over to the west at around the same time had already been involved in Neo-Nazi activism in East Germany, and once arrived in West Germany would lose no time in joining the WSG. These included Ralf Rößner and, indeed, Behrendt himself.

At the end of summer 1974 Behrendt enrolled at the University of Tübingen to study Protestant Theology and Germanistics. He became a member of the Strasbourg “Arminia” student fraternity. According to the quarterly journal “Burschenschaftliche Blätter” produced by the German "Burschenschaft" (umbrella organisation for German student fraternities) he took part in two “Mensuren” (fencing duels). During 1976/77 he was a member of the “Universities Policy Committee” of the German Burschenschaft. He was also active in the right-wing extremist “Hochschulring Tübinger Studenten” (HTS) student association which at that time was led by Axel Heinzmann, who was another of the young men recently “traded” from East to West Germany under the secret ”Häftlingsfreikauf” programme For Behrendt, meeting Heinzmann was a key experience: "From him I heard, for the first time, clarity about the German political situation". In 1976 Behrendt stood for election to the Tübingen ” AStA” (university students’ committee) as an HTS candidate. In his contributions to university politics he spoke out for anti-communism, advocated legal rehabilitation for Nazi criminals and supported apartheid racism in South Africa.

=== Leading Neo-Nazi activist in the WSG Hoffmann ===
As a Theology student at Tübingen, through his student fraternity connections and, in particular, through the HTS, Behrendt came into contact with the ”Wehrsportgruppe Hoffmann” (WSG-Hoffmann), which in 1976 already had perhaps 440 members. That made it West Germany's largest paramilitary sports club. On 4 December 1976 the extremist HTS (right-wing extremist student association) invited the WSG leader, Karl-Heinz Hoffmann to address them on the theme of “Black-communist aggression in South Africa”. Counter-protestors turned up to greet him, and Behrendt was one of a number of the HTS representatives present to take the opportunity to attack them savagely. Several of the anti-fascist demonstrators had to be hospitalised. The incident formed the basis for a criminal trial, known as the “Prinz Karl Trial" which opened in September 1977 and received extensive media coverage across West Germany. There were eleven people before the court, including both Behrendt and Hoffmann himself. The charges involved Breach of the Peace and causing Bodily Harm. The hearing ended after 18 days and Behrendt walked free. He may already have been actively engaged with the WSG by 1976: he was certainly prominently involved after the trial in 1977, quickly becoming identified as second-in-command only to Hoffmann himself.

Behrendt was one of the WSG members who was frequently invited to guard meetings, and he soon became one of the “inner core” surrounding Hoffmann. He was often involved on behalf of the group in brawls and in attacks on pet targets such as left-wing bookshops, meetings and left-wing demonstrations by those whom group members derided as “Kommunaken”. As economic growth stalled across Europe in the aftermath of the 1973/74 oil price shocks, the late 1970s became a period of intensifying street violence. Some alarmed eyewitnesses and commentators reported the attacks in which, armed with knives and “chemical clubs” (tear-gas canisters), Behrendt and other WSG activists participated as nothing less than “eruptions of naked terror", described in one report as “one of the most terrible things that has happened since 1945". The security services, even in West Germany, came under pressure to take a less relaxed approach to the situation. At one stage Hoffmann received and served an eighteen-month prison sentence because of his involvement in the violence relating to a demonstration in Tübingen; and while he was forced to step back a little from WSG frontline activism, Behrendt's own position, as the leader's most trusted lieutenant within the loosely defined hierarchy of the group became even more central. In prison Hoffmann was not kept completely ”incommunicado” by the authorities, and Behrendt continued to be selected by him to undertake “special missions”. One of the more thoroughly publicised of these, if only retrospectively, was Hoffmann's instruction that he kill Ralf Rößner, a former comrade who had also been traded for cash by the East German authorities in the early 1970s, who more recently had left the group and, for his own purposes, removed a large stash of forged dollar bills from a secret underground WSG storage location. Behrendt made arrangements to carry out his mission with dramatic effect, using a hand grenade. He failed in his mission only because when he turned up at Rößner's apartment, neither Rößner nor his girl-friend were there. The planned killing of Ralf Rößner only came to light some years later, in 1984, following Behrendt's own death.

In the summer of 1977 the WSG convened a large meeting for holocaust deniers, in Nuremberg, with participants invited from all over West Germany. The prospect of a “revisionist Auschwitz Congress” was greeted with horror by political opponents who formed an “anti-fascist action alliance” to try and persuade the Bavarian state government to ban the event. The most prominent representative of this alliance on the public stage was the rabbi Shlomo Lewin, who at that time was a leader in the Jewish religious community at Nuremberg. Lewin also took a lead in organising demonstrations against the WSG, notably to the north of the city at Ermeuth which had historical Hitlerite connections and where, more recently, the WSG, had established a headquarters. Hoffmann responded to the anti-fascist campaign with well-publicised targeted threats against Rabbi Lewin. These he followed up, some time later, in a hostile and defamatory article about Lewin, published in March 1979 in “Kommando”, a monthly political publication over which the WSG leadership exercised significant control.

Meanwhile, between April and 1979, Behrendt was in South Africa, from where he wrote to an uncle that he had joined the South African army. Details are hard to pin down, but it is known that during this period a number of German “neo-nazis” did indeed travel to South Africa and participate as mercenaries in the defence of Apartheid, a cause which was evidently dear to the hearts of a number of them. While he was in South Africa Behrendt was issued with a new passport by the West German consulate there, having reported the loss of his old passport and identity card. (In 1982 a suspect identified in sources as “an Arab” would be arrested and searched in Stockholm. The man was found to be carrying a number of “genuine” passports. These included the passport which Behrendt has reported as lost in 1979.)

In January 1980 Interior Minister Gerhart Baum, having identified the WSG as an “anti-constitutional organisation”, had it banned across the country. The membership of the organisation had swollen to at least 600 by this time, and though it did not disappear overnight, its operational effectiveness was diminished by the development: its strategic approach seems to have changed correspondingly. Hoffmann and Behrendt determined that Behrendt should base himself in Lebanon, where he arrived during or before May 1980. Lebanon was undergoing a lengthy period of ungovernability interspersed with eruptions of civil war. Behrendt's contribution involved delivering aging second-hand German military vehicles, for which the West German army no longer had any use, Palestine Liberation Organization (PLO), which had been directed from Lebanon since 1971. Details of the trade in used German military vehicles remain unclear: an important aspect of the deal between the WSG and the PLO – possibly its principle purpose from the WSG perspective – was that the Palestinians supplied weapons to the “overseas section” of the WSG and made available a training camp in Lebanon where “German Nazis” were able to continue with their “war gaming”. Behrendt's involvement included arranging procurement and the delivery of the vehicles from West Germany.

Both Behrendt and Hoffmann undertook a number of trips between West Germany and Lebanon during the second half of 1980. On 26 September 1980, while the focus media attention was brutally drawn to the Oktoberfest bombing in Munich, the two men were finalising plans for another overland “military convoy” to Lebanon. A disruptive development that they had not foreseen was the arrest of a number of WSG members in the immediate aftermath of the beer festival atrocity in Munich. The authorities searched Hoffmann’s apartment where they found a photo report about the WSG that had been cut from the pages of the Milan-based news magazine ”Oggi” (‘’Today’’). The article presented Hoffmann and Shlomo Lewin as political opponents According to at least one source it reported warnings about the WSG that Lewin had shared with the Italian journalists. On 29 September 1980 West German Intelligence notified the Bavarian Criminal Office that Hoffmann had used the article in Oggi to persuade PLO negotiating partners that he was a true “enemy of Zionism and Jewry”. (For the PLO leadership, locked in a bitter existential struggle against the state of Israel this was very important.) The intelligence service believed that persuading PLO interlocutors to support their organisation's cooperation with the WSG was central to Hoffmann's plans for his organisation. It was also on 29 September that WSG members, rounded up three days earlier in the wake of the Oktoberfest bombing in Munich were released, indicating that the prosecuting authorities were convinced that the WSG had not been implicated in that event. Just a week later, on 6 October 2022 Hoffmann returned to Lebanon. Here he gave vent to an antisemitic conspiracy theory: he told anyone listening that Israeli intelligence had planned and carried out the Oktoberfest atrocity, and that they had been motivated in their actions by the wish to torpedo collaboration between the WSG and the PLO and at the same time to eliminate Hoffmann. This version of events was published as a printed pamphlet. The pamphlet was circulated among WSG members. Irrespective of how many people believed the purportedly factual aspects of it, it fuelled the rage of the right-wing extremist against those who, allegedly, had conspired to destroy Hoffmann and the WSG. In Germany, and especially in the region surrounding Nuremberg (in which both Shlomo Lewin and, when he was in Germany, Hoffmann lived) it gave renewed impetus in many quarters to an enduring belief in some form of personal vendetta between Hoffmann and Lewin.

=== Double murder in Erlangen ===
Since the latter part of 1979 and during virtually all of 1980, when not progressing WSG priorities abroad, Behrendt lived, like the WSG leader Karl-Heinz Hoffmann, at Schloss Ermreuth, the headquarters of the movement, set in the hill country north of Nuremberg, and some 14 km (8 miles) from Erlangen. Erlangen was home to Shlomo Lewin, who remained openly and implacably hostile to everything the WSG stood for and did. On 19 December 1980 Behrendt set out for Erlangen, having first taken the precaution of disguising himself beneath an eye-catching wig and behind a large pair of women's dark glasses. At approximately 19:00 he arrived at Ebrardstraße 20, the ground-floor apartment in which Shlomo Lewin lived. Investigators subsequently determined that he had approached through the garden and peered through the window of the living room before making his way round to the front door and ringing the bell. Rabbi Shlomo Lewin opened the door. Behrendt shot him with a Beretta machine pistol that he had brought along. Frida Poeschke, Lewin's partner, emerged from another room in the apartment to see what was going on: Behrendt shot her too. Reported details are mostly vague, but according to the most precise account of the matter, Behrendt fired three shots into the torso of each of his victims and then, once they had fallen, ensured their quick deaths with a further well-aimed shot to the head of each. He left in some haste, leaving behind a pair of "Schubert" branded sunglasses and part of an improvised homemade gun silencer. The bodies were found by acquaintances of the deceased at 19:04.

=== Flight ===
After the killing Behrendt returned at once to Ermreuth, and supplied what seems to have been a very full confession to Hoffmann. Hoffmann moved fast. He immediately warned his girlfriend to be ready with an explanation when the police came to ask her why her sunglasses had been found at the scene of a suspected double murder. He then gathered up from the basement at their castle home all the bullets and any other ammunition for his weapons collection, crushed them beyond recognition, and disposed of the resulting detritus. He made Behrendt hand over all the clothes he had worn for his murderous trip into town and burned them in the tiled heating oven that in cold weather warmed his apartment in the building. He urged his friend to leave Germany at once and handed over 1000 marks for a flight ticket to Lebanon. Already Behrendt had a visiting visa for East Germany, having apparently planned to visit his mother in Pößneck, and when he left West Germany on 21 December 1980 it was the so-called “Inner German border” that he crossed in order to visit his mother at her home. He returned to Ermreuth on 26 December, however, packed a bag and, while many security service personnel were presumably still, at their own homes celebrating the Christmas holiday, took a train to Bonn, stopping off at the Syrian embassy where he collected a visa. He then took a flight from the little “Köln/Bonn” airport to Damascus from where he took a connecting flight across to Beirut (Lebanon). From there he made his way back to the nearby “Bir Hassan” PLO training camp with which he was already familiar from previous visits. His friend and partner in activism, Hoffmann, had arrived at the camp a day earlier and conferred on him the rank of WSG “Lieutenant Colonel”, a seemingly more formal status that had been in place hitherto, and which was conferred along with overall responsibilities for “WSG-Ausland”, the name by which the organisation's operations in the “Bir Hassan” training camp were identified. (Note: Sources differ over the precise sequence of Behrendt’s movements and certain related dates for the ten day period starting on 20 December 1980. The sequence set out here is the closest available to a consensus between various similarly plausible sources.)

=== Kai Uwe Bergmann ===
The focus of Behrendt's WSG duties in Lebanon was to keep the "WSG-Ausland" together, applying “robust disciplinary methods”. At this time the group still had 15 members in the camp, several of whom are believed to have suffered physical mistreatment amounting, on occasion, to severe torture. A particularly brutal case involved Kay Uwe Bergmann who breached the smoking prohibition under which the “WSG-Ausland” operated. Bergmann was forced to undertake a forced march in the full heat of the day while carrying a filled rucksack and wearing a gas mask. He was forced to drink salted cooking oil and then to eat his resulting vomit. Overnight he was chained to his bed, still encumbered by all the gear with which he had been sent out on the desert march, and scared half to death with a waterboarding torture. In or before February 1981 Bergmann was transferred to a ““PLO hospital” from where he attempted to escape. After that Hoffmann beat him badly before ordering a further round of torture, which was performed by Behrendt and another group member, Joachim Bojarsky. Some years later, invited to testify before a court on the fate of Kay Uwe Bergmann, Hoffmann would assert that by the time of the alleged fatal torture session, he had himself already left the camp: responsibility for Bergmann's death was down to Behrendt (who by the time Hoffmann addressed a court on the subject was long dead). According to statements subsequently provided by two former WSG men, Odfried Hepp and Peter Hamburger, Hoffmann was present. By the end of February 1981 Kay Uwe Bergmann had disappeared. According to rumours circulating within the WSG he died as a result of this latest torture session and his body was buried in a still undisclosed location somewhere in Lebanon. Bergmann's death, resulting from the torture inflicted on him in Lebanon in February 1981, is described in at least one source as “an open secret”, though the verdict delivered on the matter by investigative journalists was never confirmed in a court of law. The assessment is nevertheless widely shared, along with the determination that Behrendt and Hoffmann were responsible for the death.

=== Final months ===
According to information subsequently obtained from West German government sources, in May 1981 Behrendt was using a false passport. There are reports that during the first half of 1981 he returned from Lebanon to Europe where he performed another murder.

Karl-Heinz Hoffmann also decided to return to West Germany where he was arrested at Frankfurt Airport on 16 June 1981. (Note: Although there is no question about the place and date of Hoffmann’s arrest, sources differ over whether Hoffmann was about to board a flight for Lebanon, or had just arrived from Lebanon, when he was arrested.) By this time Behrendt seems to have been back in Lebanon, where he reacted to his friend's arrest by plotting a series of atrocities with WSG comrades. These included a raid on an oil refinery back in West Germany, and, closer to their Lebanese base, attacks on a UN convoy, the United States army and an Israeli ship. Former members who had left the group were identified as traitors and listed for future killings. There was an idea for a west-facing “freedom radio station”. There were contingency plans drafted for kidnapping embassy staff and shooting judges and state prosecutors if Hoffmann should be imprisoned by the authorities in West Germany for longer than six months. Their hit list included from the outset the name of Gerulf Schmidt, the Nuremberg district prosecutor leading the initial phase of investigations into Hoffmann's case.

=== Death ===
On 5 September 1981 Behrendt wrote a farewell letter to his mother and sisters from the PLO camp in which he was still living. He told them that once he had finished the letter he would shoot himself. He made no mention, in his letter, of the actions or motives that had led him to this decision.

The PLO sent the letter with their own report of Behrendt's death to the Ministry for Homeland Security (Stasi) in East Berlin. The apparent cause of death had been a single bullet through the skull. The letter was presumably passed on to the intended recipients once they had made the copies necessary for their own purposes. The text of the handwritten letter found its way from the ministry files into the public domain after 1990. An officer at the ministry recorded receipt of the information and added his own comments to the inevitable file, noting that the PLO had “reconstructed the suicide” and referenced “major differences of opinion” within the so-called “WSG-Ausland” of which Behrendt had been the leader in the group's Lebanese camp homebase. The Stasi notes also record that Behrendt himself had been increasingly calling into question the usefulness of his [WSG] activities.

The wave of extremist terrorism that had swept through West Germany and Italy through the 1970s continued to fascinate investigative journalists and their readers during the years that followed, especially in cases where new snippets of knowledge surfaced periodically, often in the context of court hearings, providing opportunities for regular re-evaluations. Uwe Behrendt's murderous life and subsequent suicide were a case in point. In 1983 three former WSG activists, Klaus Hubel, Joachim Bojarsky and Leroy Paul, told West German investigators that Uwe Behrendt had died in Lebanon An Associated Press Agency report dated 23 August 1984 stated that Lebanese police had found the dead body of Uwe Behrendt. The Lebanese Civil War had become less intensive than formerly following a withdrawal from Lebanon by the Israeli army, but significant civil conflict remained a feature of Lebanese life, and the Civil War was followed by continuing disturbances on the ground in the south of the country, meaning that reports sourced to “Lebanese police” were not always accepted at face value by western commentators. This report indicated that shortly before his death Behrendt had left the “Guerrilla training camp” where he lived, having been recruited to the Red Army Faction, a West German terrorist association associated not with “Neo-nazism” but with far-left anti-capitalist militancy. It was reported that he had then been detained in a ”PLO prison”. He had attempted to escape and been shot as he did so. His body, it was written, had been buried by his "murderer". Within a couple of weeks Criminal Investigators from West Germany arrived in Lebanon and exhumed a body from the location where, on account of information received from the former WSG activist Leroy Paul, they had expected to find it. They returned to Munich with the corpse which they handed over to the Legal-Medical Institute. It was indeed the body of Uwe Behrendt. Uncertainties as to the cause of his death had now surfaced, however, and these doubts began to fester. In January 1985 Leroy Paul told a West German court that he had personally witnessed Behrendt's suicide and had also been present when the body had been buried “in a Palestinian cemetery”. Doubts have persisted.

Although reports that Behrendt had died by suicide were initially accepted as reasonable, it subsequently occurred to the more thoughtful among the commentators that all the reports of a suicide were seemingly based solely on eye-witness testimony from former WSG activists at a time when they faced criminal investigation by the West German authorities. They were, by definition, men with a background as political extremists with a personal interest in doing everything necessary to reduce the severity of any future criminal penalty that they might suffer. It was in the context of continuing unease about the reliability of the suicide reports that in 2017 members of the ”Linke” party submitted a superficially innocuous parliamentary question in the “Bundestag” (German national parliament) about the circumstances under which Uwe Behrendt had died. In their reply, the government stated that the determination that Behrendt had committed suicide was based on witness testimonies and on the forensic examination of his body performed in Munich in 1984. The obvious question that remained unanswered was how it could be determined, by means of a post mortem performed on a badly decomposed body that had been rotting in a desert grave for three years, that the hole in the skull was the result of a suicide rather than of a gun shot fired by an unknown third party.

== Murder investigation and a posthumous criminal trial ==
The murder of Shlomo Lewin and Frida Poeschke was naturally thoroughly investigated. The death, reportedly by suicide, of one of the two principal suspects in September 1981, did not put an end to the investigation, though it did encourage the investigators to focus their subsequent work on securing a conviction for the suspect who was still alive, Hoffmann. Police arriving at the murder scene on 19 December 1980 found no sign of a struggle. There was no indication of the victims having been tied up. This led to the working assumption that the killing was pre-planned. The facts that each victim had been shot four times, and that it had apparently not been until the firing of a fourth shot that either victim had been killed, drove the conclusion that the killer had been an “amateur” rather than a former member of the forces and/or contract killer. The way in which the cartridge cases had been deformed indicated that the murder weapon had been temporarily soldered. This, and the location of the extremist organisation's "head quarter" at Ermreuth, led to suspicions of WSG involvement. It was known that the WSG used soldered weapons in order to avoid their being classified as illegally held firearms. Attention also focused on the sunglasses left at the scene of the crime. These had been purchased from “Optiker Schubert”, an optician in the little town of Heroldsberg, known to be the location of an earlier “WSG headquarters”, used before Hoffmann moved his base the short distance to Schloss Ermreuth. The evidence linking to Hoffmann to the sunglasses, though circumstantial, was more powerful still. The sunglasses were of a unique style and carried the customer number "127". The optician lived in Heroldsberg, directly next door to the house in which Karl-Heinz Hoffmann had lived for many years.

Media reports started to speculate about the owner of the distinctive sunglasses on 22 December 1980, but the police continued to look for the clues that might identify the perpetrator of the murder in the immediate area in which the victims lived, and among the small Jewish community in the surrounding Nuremberg-Erlangen conurbation. It took a further five weeks before the criminal police, having investigated the link between the glasses and the optician who had supplied them, turned up to question Hoffmann. They now established without further delay that the “Schubert” branded sunglasses had been supplied for Hoffmann's girlfriend, Franziska Birkmann. This gave them two suspects in connection with their murder, Hoffmann and Birkmann. Examination of the spent gun cartridges at the crime scene established that the murder weapon had been a Beretta gun, modified through the addition of a home-made silencer device which had been broken when the gun was fired. Hoffmann was a legal owner of a fire arm of this type. He and Behrendt had constructed the silencer in December 1980 and then tested it in a cellar in the grounds of Schloss Ermreuth. The lid of an aerosol spray-can found at the crime scene contained traces of the same chemical combination as that in a filler-foam recently used to install new doors and windows at Schloss Ermreuth. In addition to these traces, when police searched Schloss Ermeuth they also checked the boiler, where they found traces of the burned clothing that Hoffmann had insisted on destroying after Behrendt had reported back, following his trip to Erlangen on the day of the killing. Based on these discoveries the police developed their hypothesis further. The murder had been carried out not by two people but by three. The third was Uwe Behrendt who was still alive and who, according to this scenario, had fired the gun, while Karl-Heinz Hoffmann was cast as instigator and Franziska Birkmann as the accomplice. In addition to fitting the available evidence, this hypothesis held out the possibility of securing three important convictions, if a more persuasive case could be built up. As matters stood, however, it was too reliant on untested hypotheses to stand up in a court.

Hoffmann himself had returned to Lebanon at the end of December 1980, indeed arriving there a day ahead of Behrendt. During April 1981 he came back to West Germany, however, in order to work on the next consignment of military supplies for delivery to the PLO. Because he was away during the early part of the police investigation, it was only on 27 April 1981 that he faced his own first police interview on the Lewin-Poeschke double murder. Hoffmann was interviewed, in the first instance, not as a suspect but as a witness. Hoffmann stated that on 19 December 1980, the day of the crime, both Franziska Birkmann and Uwe Behrendt had been at the Schloss Ermreuth home which the three of them shared throughout the entire day. Once investigators determined that the sunglasses found at the scene of the crime belonged to Franziska Birkmann, however, they surmised that Hoffmann's assurance that neither Birkmann nor Behrendt had left the castle on the day of the crime had been incorrect, and that they had sufficient reason to arrest Hoffmann. This they did Frankfurt Airport on 16 June 1981, shortly before he boarded a flight for Lebanon.

Interviewed by investigators in August 1981, Franziska Birkmann stated that during the night on 20 December 1980 Hoffmann had told her about “Behrendt’s murder [of Lewin and Poeschke]” and about the sunglasses – her sunglasses - that had been left behind at the crime scene. She was then asked whether Hoffmann had been involved in the killings. She nodded but refused to elucidate. According to notes of the interview she stated “I cannot say anything or I would incriminate him”. Behrendt, meanwhile, was still abroad. On 23 August 1981 the Erlangen district court nevertheless issued a warrant for his arrest. A couple of weeks later, on 4 September 1981, Hoffmann withdrew his first statement to the police. He now stated that during the evening on which the crime was committed he had been at Ermeuth with Franziska Birkmann, expecting a visit from two WSG members. The individuals in question were able to confirm the alibi, indicating that neither Hoffmann nor Birkmann had been present at the crime scene. Later that evening, according to Hoffmann's new statement, Behrendt had returned home and had confessed to him that he had shot the leader of the Nuremberg Jewish community dead, along with the man's partner. On the way back to Ermeuth, Behrendt had said, he had disposed of the murder weapon, burying it where it would not be found. Asked by Hoffmann about his motive, Hoffmann stated that Behrendt had replied, "Yes, boss, I did that for you. too", indicating that the deed had represented some form of revenge for the Oktoberfest atrocity a couple of months earlier. The Oktoberfest atrocity had been in effect an assassination attempt intended to incriminate Hoffmann, and according to Hoffmann, Behrendt had said that he could no longer bear to see how the thought of it had been weighing on Hoffmann, wearing him down. Someone had to do something, because poor Hoffmann himself had done nothing wrong. Behrendt had confessed to Hoffmann, Hoffmann said, because he knew Hoffmann would not betray his confidence, for fear of somehow becoming implicated himself. Behrendt knew about Shlomo Lewin from “Kommando”, the WSG's political monthly magazine much of which Hoffmann wrote. There were some conspicuous gaps in Hoffmann's new statement to investigators. Hoffmann had no explanation as to how Behrendt had travelled from Ermeuth to the murder scene at Erlangen and back. He was pressed on the whereabouts of missing pieces of the broken gun silencer, insisting that he had already disposed of the silencer that he and Behrendt had constructed together before the evening of the murder.

From the Federal Public Prosecutor in Karlsruhe, Gerulf Schmidt, a local state prosecutor in Erlangen, now received an instruction to undertake a criminal investigation into Karl-Heinz Hoffmann in order to test the suspicion that Hoffmann was the ringleader of a terrorist organisation involved in murderous and other violent attacks. Very shortly afterwards, however, in January 1982, the Federal Court of Justice (Supreme Criminal Court), also in Karlsruhe, delivered a judgement of its own, in an unrelated case, under §129a of the criminal code (which deals with “creating terrorist organisations”). The part of the national judgement which could be expected to have a bearing on prosecutor Schmidt's investigations at a state level was the determination that the section of the criminal code dealing with terrorism offences could only be applied within German borders. It may have been that the Bavarian State Criminal Department were taking a lead from the higher court judgement when they decided not to travel to Lebanon to locate the body of Kay Uwe Bergmann, believed to be a more recent victim of a killing in which Behrendt was centrally implicated. There were, however, other more practical “on the ground” reasons why trying to find the body of a dead German terrorist trainee in war-torn Lebanon might have been considered unlikely to succeed. By this stage no one knew where Behrendt himself was. Meanwhile, in 1983 Rudolf Brunner, the Chief Public Prosecutor for the Nuremberg region, issued an indictment against Hoffmann on two counts of murder. Franziska Birkmann was indicted too, as an accessory to the crimes alleged. The prosecution case advanced by Brunner was centred on a contention that Behrendt had fired the gun that killed the victims, but he was acting on instructions from Hoffmann and Birkmann who were present at the scene. The district court, following a hearing presided over by Johann Mürschberger, was not persuaded that the available evidence supported the prosecution case. In refusing to convict, the court implicitly placed some level of confidence in statements by Hoffmann that the home-made gun silencer had been produced simply as a “prototype sample” in connection with a planned gun-silencer manufactory in Lebanon. There had indeed been a Beretta machine pistol at Ermeuth when the police had searched the place in December 1980, but it was legally held for purposes of self-defence. From their acceptance of these elements in Hoffmann's testimony, the judges went on to conclude that Hoffmann's claim that Behrendt had perpetrated the murder as a solitary killer, without murderous input from Hoffmann, his girlfriend, or anyone else, was sufficiently plausible to destroy the prosecutor's case against Hoffmann. Opinions on the trial remained polarised, however. Those disinclined to allow Hoffmann the benefit of the doubt contend that the court gave insufficient weighting to other statements by Hoffmann which had predated the murder. In January 1980 he had reacted to the nationwide banning of the WSG with a threat: his future actions could become “much more disagreeable for the ruling circles”. (Note: “… für die herrschenden Kreise weitaus unangenehmer werden”.) Several witnesses were produced to testify that shortly before the Lewin-Poeschke murder Hoffmann had been heard to say, “One day I’ll do something that everyone will notice”. (Note: “Eines Tages mache ich was, da werden dann alle schauen”.) The murder charges were nevertheless withdrawn. Hoffmann remained in investigative custody, however, on account of numerous other charges for which investigations remained ongoing.

In 1982 testimony was obtained from Hans-Peter Fraas (known within Hoffmann's circle as “Walter Frintz” or, more simply, "Achmed”) and Alfred Keeß, originally from Ingolstadt, two former WSG members recently returned from Lebanon, that Hoffmann had wanted to recruit them “for the murder of a Jew”. Keeß gave more detail, stating that in the immediate aftermath of the Oktoberfest atrocity Hoffmann had several times asked him if he would “kill an elderly Jew near Ermeuth”. He said that Hoffmann had recommended that he should use a wig and sunglasses as a disguise, and to use a weapon fitted with a silencer. A wig was found in Hoffmann's apartment which the witness claimed to have seen on the head of an unknown person and to recognise it when it was shown to him. In addition, Keeß said that when he had been with Behrendt in Lebanon, Behrendt had confessed to having performed the double murder of Lewin and Poeschke.

Hoffmann faced new charges in July 1984, this time under a formidable palette of charges that included the preparation of explosives attacks, aggravated burglary, forging fake money, coercion, aggravated wounding, deprivation of liberty and offences against the gun laws. During the main hearing, which opened on 12 September 1984, significant clarifications of his relationship with Uwe Behrendt emerged. With Behrendt now dead, it was no longer possible for witness testimony of any concrete agreement between Behrendt and Hoffmann for the commission of the double murder. Hoffmann insisted that statements by others that he had wanted to persuade WSG members to “murder a Jew” were nothing more than wild attempts at revenge by men who had become resentful over the harsh discipline whereby the organisation had been controlled by him. Behrendt himself, Hoffmann now derided as a “dumb ox, driven by an addiction to activism”. When it came to the murder, he insisted that Behrendt had been a "crazy lone killer". The main part of the trial hearing appears to have been deferred until the end of 1985. After a trial lasting 185 or 186 days (sources differ), the court delivered its verdict on 30 June 1986 and sentenced Hoffmann to a nine and a half year prison sentence for assaulting his followers in Lebanon, counterfeiting money, obstructing a criminal prosecution and breaching gun laws. But the court acquitted him of charges relating to the commissioning and/or preparation of the murders of Shlomo Lewin and Frida Poeschke. The court pronounced itself satisfied that the double murder had been planned and carried out by Uwe Behrendt, acting of his own volition. The court noted Hoffmann's frantic efforts to destroy the evidence when Behrendt had come to him directly after the murder and confessed what had happened, but instead of identifying this as an obstruction of justice, the court determined that it was entirely reasonable that Hoffmann did what he did, simply in order to protect his own position. Behrendt had died before he could face trial in connection with the Lewin- Poeschke double murder, but commentators draw attention to the sense in which, despite not having been charged or present at the hearing, the verdict delivered at the trial of his friend in 1986 amounted to a posthumously delivered guilty verdict for Behrendt in respect of the murder. Several of the court's conclusions in respect of the official defendant, Karl-Heinz Hoffmann, have also perplexed a number of the commentators who have studied the case ever since.

A further source of unease among serious journalist-commentators has been (and remains) the continuing refusal of the “Bundesverfassungsschutz” (Germany's ‘’national office for the protection of the constitution’’) to permit access to official files on a number of WSG witnesses involved in the trial, who were described as having been working from within the “neo-nazi” group as government informants. The suspiciously formulaic “catch-all” grounds provided for the refusal by the government agency responsible to release the files is simply that any such inspection of them would imperil "the wellbeing of the Federal Republic of Germany".
