= Embassy of the United Arab Emirates, Berlin =

Diplomatic mission of the United Arab Emirates to Germany

Embassy of the United Arab Emirates in Berlin
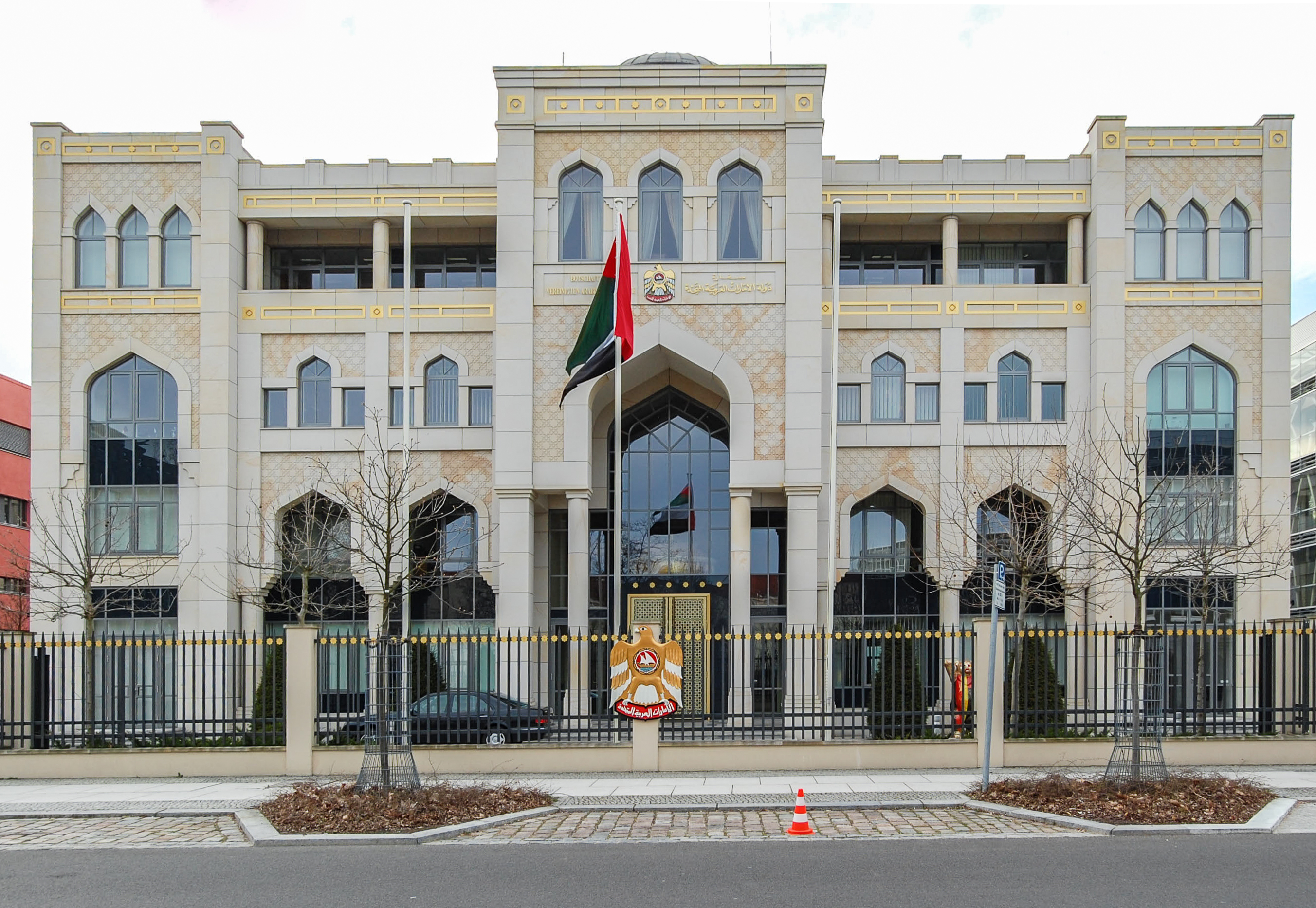
- Entrance to the embassy of the UAE in Berlin
- Location: Berlin, Germany
- Address: Hiroshimastraße 18–20, 10785 Berlin, Germany
- Coordinates: 52°30′28.8″N 13°21′26.9″E
- Ambassador: Ahmed Alattar (since October 2022)
- Website: www.uae-embassy.de/en/

The Embassy of the United Arab Emirates in Berlin is the diplomatic mission of the United Arab Emirates (UAE) to the Federal Republic of Germany. It is located at Hiroshimastraße 18–20, 10785 Berlin, in the Tiergarten district.

His Excellency Ahmed Alattar is the current ambassador, a post held since 24 October 2022.

== History ==
The UAE established diplomatic relations with Germany in 1972 and diplomatic representation in 1976, shortly after the UAE's formation in 1971.

== Ambassador ==
His Excellency Ahmed Alattar presented his credentials to the president of Germany, Frank-Walter Steinmeier, in October 2022. Prior to his diplomatic career, the ambassador started his career working at the energy company, Abu Dhabi National Oil Company (ADNOC).

== See also ==
- Foreign relations of the United Arab Emirates
- Foreign relations of Germany
- List of diplomatic missions of the United Arab Emirates
- List of diplomatic missions in Germany
