= German embassy =

German embassy may refer to:

- List of diplomatic missions of Germany
- List of diplomatic missions in Germany
