= List of diplomatic missions in Germany =

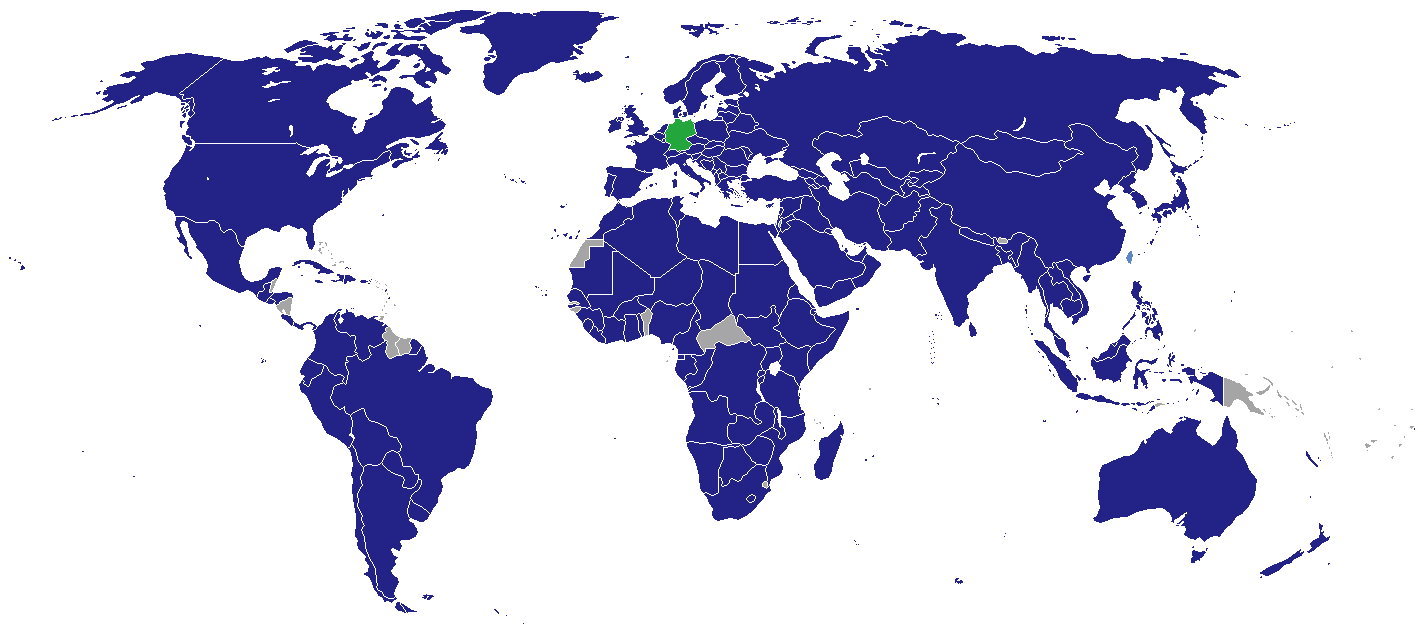
Map of diplomatic missions in Germany

This article lists diplomatic missions resident in Germany. At present, Germany hosts 159 embassies.

Since the reunification of Germany in 1990, and the decision of the federal parliament to move the capital from Bonn to Berlin in 1991, all countries that maintain resident embassies in Germany have moved to Berlin. Nonetheless, a few countries still maintain resident missions in Bonn, which serve as extension offices of their embassies. Several countries have consulates/consulates general in major cities, namely Frankfurt, Düsseldorf, Hamburg, Munich, and Stuttgart.

This listing excludes honorary consulates.

== Diplomatic missions in Berlin ==
Country	Mission type	Address	Photo	Link
Afghanistan	Embassy	Taunusstraße 3		
Albania	Embassy	Friedrichstr 231		
Algeria	Embassy	Görschstr 45		
Angola	Embassy	Werderscher Markt 9		
Argentina	Embassy	Von-der-Heydt-Str. 2		
Armenia	Embassy	Nussbaumallee 4		
Australia	Embassy	Wallstraße 76-79		
Austria	Embassy	Stauffenbergstraße 1		
Azerbaijan	Embassy	Hubertusallee 43		
Bahrain	Embassy	Klingelhöferstraße 7		
Bangladesh	Embassy	Kaiserin-Augusta-Allee 111		
Belarus	Embassy	Am Treptower Park 31-32		
Belgium	Embassy	Jägerstrasse 52-53		
Bolivia	Embassy	Wichmannstr 6		
Bosnia and Herzegovina	Embassy	Ibsenstr 14		
Botswana	Embassy	Altensteinstrasse 48A		
Brazil	Embassy	Wallstrasse 57		
Brunei	Embassy	Kronenstraße 55-58		
Bulgaria	Embassy	Mauerstrasse 11		
Burkina Faso	Embassy	Karolingerplatz 10-11		
Burundi	Embassy	Berliner Strasse 36		
Cambodia	Embassy	Benjamin-Vogelsdorff-Str. 2		
Cameroon	Embassy	Ulmenallee 32		
Canada	Embassy	Leipziger Platz 17		
Cape Verde	Embassy	Stavanger Str. 16		
Chad	Embassy	Lepsiusstraße 114		
Chile	Embassy	Mohrenstrasse 42		
China	Embassy	Märkisches Ufer 54		
Colombia	Embassy	Taubenstr. 23		
Congo-Brazzaville	Embassy	Wallstraße 69		
Congo-Kinshasa	Embassy	Ulmenallee 42a		
Costa Rica	Embassy	Reinhardtstraße 47A		
Croatia	Embassy	Ahornstraße 4		
Cuba	Embassy	Stavangerstraße 20		
Cyprus	Embassy	Kurfürstendamm 182		
Czech Republic	Embassy	Hausvogteiplatz 10 (temporary)		
Denmark	Embassy	Rauchstr. 1		
Djibouti	Embassy	Tauentzienstrasse 6		
Dominican Republic	Embassy	Knesebeckstraße 61A		
Ecuador	Embassy	Joachimsthaler Str. 12		
Egypt	Embassy	Stauffenbergstr. 6-7		
El Salvador	Embassy	Hessische Strasse 11		
Equatorial Guinea	Embassy	Rohlfsstraße 17 – 19		
Eritrea	Embassy	Stavangerstraße 18		
Estonia	Embassy	Hildebrandstraße 5		
Ethiopia	Embassy	Boothstrasse 20a		
Finland	Embassy	Rauchstr. 1		
France	Embassy	Pariser Platz 5		
Gabon	Embassy	Hohensteiner Strasse 16		
Georgia	Embassy	Rauchstraße 11		
Ghana	Embassy	Stavangerstrasse 17 & 19		
Greece	Embassy	Hiroshimastr. 11-15		
Guatemala	Embassy	Behrenstraße 27		
Guinea	Embassy	Jägerstrasse 67-69		
Haiti	Embassy	Uhlandstrasse 14		
Holy See	Apostolic Nunciature	Lilienthalstraße 3A		
Honduras	Embassy	Cuxhavener Str. 14		
Hungary	Embassy	Unter den Linden 76		
Iceland	Embassy	Rauchstraße 1		
India	Embassy	Tiergartenstraße 17		
Indonesia	Embassy	Clara-Wieck-Straße 1		
Iran	Embassy	Podbielskiallee 67		
Iraq	Embassy	Pacelliallee 19-21		
Ireland	Embassy	Jägerstraße 51		
Israel	Embassy	Auguste-Viktoria-Straße 74		
Italy	Embassy	Hiroshimastr. 1		
Ivory Coast	Embassy	Schinkelstrasse 10		
Jamaica	Embassy	Schmargendorfer Strasse 32		
Japan	Embassy	Hiroshimastraße 6		
Jordan	Embassy	Heerstraße 201		
Kazakhstan	Embassy	Nordendstraße 14/17		
Kenya	Embassy	Rheinbabenallee 49		
Kosovo	Embassy	Koenigsallee 20A/20B		
Kuwait	Embassy	Griegstraße 5-7		
Kyrgyzstan	Embassy	Otto-Suhr-Allee 146		
Laos	Embassy	Bismarckallee 2A		
Latvia	Embassy	Reinerzstraße 40/41		
Lebanon	Embassy	Berliner Str. 127		
Lesotho	Embassy	Kanada Allee 15a		
Liberia	Embassy	Düsseldorfer Straße 38		
Libya	Embassy	Podbielskiallee 42		
Liechtenstein	Embassy	Mohrenstrasse 42		
Lithuania	Embassy	Charitestr. 9		
Luxembourg	Embassy	Klingelhöferstraße 7		
Madagascar	Embassy	Seepromenade 92, Falkensee		
Malawi	Embassy	Westfaelische Strasse 86		
Malaysia	Embassy	Klingelhoefer Strasse 6		
Maldives	Embassy	Friedrichstrasse 55A		
Mali	Embassy	Kurfürstendamm 72		
Malta	Embassy	Klingelhöferstraße 7		
Mauritania	Embassy	Joachimsthalerstraße 30		
Mauritius	Embassy	Katharinenstrasse 9		
Mexico	Embassy	Klingelhöferstraße 3		
Moldova	Embassy	Gotlandstraße 16		
Monaco	Embassy	Klingelhöferstraße 7		
Mongolia	Embassy	Hausvogteiplatz 14		
Montenegro	Embassy	Charlottenstraße 35/36		
Morocco	Embassy	Niederwallstraße 39		
Mozambique	Embassy	Stromstraße 47		
Myanmar	Embassy	Thielallee 19		
Namibia	Embassy	Reichsstr. 17		
Nepal	Embassy	Guerickestrasse 27		
Netherlands	Embassy	Klosterstraße 50		
New Zealand	Embassy	Friedrichstrasse 60		
Niger	Embassy	Machnower Str. 24		
Nigeria	Embassy	Neue Jakobstrasse 4		
North Korea	Embassy	Glinkastraße 5-7		
North Macedonia	Embassy	Koenigsallee 2-4		
Norway	Embassy	Rauchstraße 1		
Oman	Embassy	Clayallee 82		
Pakistan	Embassy	Schaperstraße 29		
Panama	Embassy	Wichmannstraße 6		
Paraguay	Embassy	Hardenbergstrasse 12		
Peru	Embassy	Taubenstraße 20		
Philippines	Embassy	Luisenstraße 16		
Poland	Embassy	Unter den Linden 70-72		
Portugal	Embassy	Zimmerstraße 56		
Qatar	Embassy	Hagenstr 56		
Romania	Embassy	Dorotheenstraße 62-66		
Russia	Embassy	Unter den Linden 63-65		
Rwanda	Embassy	Jägerstraße 67-69		
Saudi Arabia	Embassy	Tiergartenstrasse 33-34		
Senegal	Embassy	Klingelhöferstr. 5		
Serbia	Embassy	Taubert Strasse 18		
Sierra Leone	Embassy	Herwarthstraße 4		
Singapore	Embassy	Voßstraße 17		
Slovakia	Embassy	Hildebrandstraße 25		
Slovenia	Embassy	Hausvogteiplatz 3-4		
Somalia	Embassy	Rheinstraße 10		
South Africa	Embassy	Tiergartenstr. 18		
South Korea	Embassy	Stülerstraße 8-10		
South Sudan	Embassy	Leipziger Pl. 8		
Spain	Embassy	Lichtensteinallee 1		
Sri Lanka	Embassy	Niklasstraße 19		
Sudan	Embassy	Katharinenstraße 17		
Sweden	Embassy	Rauchstraße 1		
Switzerland	Embassy	Otto-von-Bismarck-Allee 4A		
Syria	Embassy	Rauchstraße 25		
Tajikistan	Embassy	Perleberger Str. 43		
Tanzania	Embassy	Eschenallee 11		
Thailand	Embassy	Lepsiusstrasse 64/66		
Togo	Embassy	Grabbeallee 43		
Tunisia	Embassy	Lindenallee 16		
Turkey	Embassy	Tiergartenstr. 19-21		
Turkmenistan	Embassy	Behrenstrasse 42		
Uganda	Embassy	Axel-Springer-Straße 54a		
Ukraine	Embassy	Albrechtstrasse 26		
United Arab Emirates	Embassy	Hiroshimastraße 18		
United Kingdom	Embassy	Wilhelmstraße 70/71		
United States	Embassy	Clayallee 170		
Uruguay	Embassy	Budapester Strasse 39		
Uzbekistan	Embassy	Perleberger Straße 62		
Venezuela	Embassy	Schillstrasse 10		
Vietnam	Embassy	Elsenstraße 3		
Yemen	Embassy	Schmidt-Ott-Straße 7		
Zambia	Embassy	Axel-Springer-Straße 54a		
Zimbabwe	Embassy	Dannenwalder Weg 91		

=== Other missions or representative offices in Berlin ===
- Abkhazia (Representative office)
- Catalonia (Delegation)
- Hong Kong (Economic and Trade Office)
- Northern Cyprus (Representative Office)
- Palestine (General Delegation)
- Sahrawi Republic (Representative office)
- Taiwan (Representative office)

== Embassy branch offices in Bonn ==
- China
- Cuba
- Kazakhstan
- North Macedonia
- Qatar
- South Korea
- United States

== Consular missions ==
The following cities host career consular missions. All are consulates-general unless otherwise noted.

=== Bonn, North Rhine-Westphalia ===
1. Afghanistan (Consulate-General)
2. Argentina (Consulate)
3. Romania
4. Syria

=== Cologne, North Rhine-Westphalia ===
1. Italy
2. Poland
3. Turkey

=== Dortmund, North Rhine-Westphalia ===
1. Italy (Consulate)

=== Dresden, Saxony ===
1. Czech Republic

=== Düsseldorf, North Rhine-Westphalia ===
1. Bulgaria
2. Canada (Consulate)
3. China
4. Croatia
5. Czech Republic
6. France
7. Greece
8. Hungary
9. Japan
10. Kosovo
11. Libya
12. Morocco
13. Netherlands
14. Portugal
15. Serbia
16. Spain
17. Switzerland
18. Tunisia (Note: Originally established in Bonn, the consulate-general was transferred to Düsseldorf in May 2025.)
19. Turkey
20. Ukraine
21. United Kingdom
22. United States

=== Essen, North Rhine-Westphalia ===
1. Turkey

=== Flensburg, Schleswig-Holstein ===
1. Denmark

=== Frankfurt, Hesse ===
1. Algeria
2. Argentina
3. Australia
4. Bosnia and Herzegovina
5. Brazil
6. Bulgaria
7. Chile
8. China
9. Colombia
10. Dominican Republic
11. Croatia
12. Egypt
13. Eritrea
14. France
15. Georgia
16. Greece
17. India
18. Indonesia
19. Iraq
20. Ireland
21. Italy
22. Japan
23. Kazakhstan
24. Kyrgyzstan (Consulate)
25. Kosovo
26. Kuwait
27. Malaysia
28. Mexico
29. Moldova
30. Montenegro
31. Morocco
32. Nigeria
33. Pakistan
34. Paraguay
35. Peru
36. Philippines
37. Portugal (Consular office)
38. Saudi Arabia
39. Serbia
40. South Korea
41. Spain
42. Switzerland
43. Taiwan (Representative offive)
44. Thailand
45. Turkey
46. Turkmenistan (Consulate)
47. Ukraine
48. United States
49. Uzbekistan
50. Vietnam
51. Yemen

=== Freiburg im Breisgau, Baden-Württemberg ===
1. Italy (Consulate)

=== Hamburg ===
1. Argentina
2. Chile
3. China
4. Croatia
5. Cyprus
6. Denmark
7. Dominican Republic
8. Ecuador
9. Egypt
10. France
11. Greece
12. India
13. Indonesia
14. Ghana
15. Japan
16. Kosovo
17. Panama
18. Peru
19. Poland
20. Portugal
21. Serbia
22. South Korea
23. Spain
24. Taiwan (Representative office)
25. Tunisia (Consulate)
26. Turkey
27. Ukraine
28. United States
29. Uruguay

=== Hanover, Lower Saxony ===
- Italy
- Turkey

=== Karlsruhe, Baden-Württemberg ===
- Turkey

=== Leipzig, Saxony ===
- Russia
- United States

=== Mainz, Rhineland-Palatinate ===
- Turkey

=== Munich, Bavaria ===
1. Afghanistan
2. Albania
3. Austria
4. Belarus
5. Bosnia and Herzegovina
6. Brazil
7. Bulgaria
8. Canada (Consulate)
9. Chile
10. China
11. Croatia
12. Czechia
13. Denmark
14. France
15. Greece
16. Hungary
17. India
18. Ireland
19. Israel
20. Italy
21. Japan
22. Kazakhstan
23. Kosovo
24. Lithuania
25. Netherlands
26. North Macedonia
27. Pakistan
28. Peru
29. Poland
30. Qatar
31. Romania
32. Serbia
33. Slovakia
34. Slovenia
35. South Africa
36. Spain
37. Switzerland
38. Thailand
39. Taiwan
40. Tunisia (Consulate)
41. Turkey
42. United Arab Emirates
43. Ukraine
44. United Kingdom
45. United States

=== Münster, North Rhine-Westphalia ===
- Turkey

=== Nuremberg, Bavaria ===
1. Turkey

=== Saarbrücken, Saarland ===
- France

=== Stuttgart, Baden-Württemberg ===
- Bosnia and Herzegovina
- Canada (Consulate)
- Croatia
- France
- Greece
- Hungary
- Italy
- Kosovo
- Portugal
- Serbia
- Spain
- Romania
- Switzerland
- Turkey

=== Wolfsburg, Lower Saxony ===
- Italy (Consular agency)

== Missions to open ==
=== Berlin ===
- Gambia - Embassy
- Timor-Leste - Embassy

=== Frankfurt ===
- Bangladesh - Consulate General

== Accredited non-resident embassies ==
=== Resident in Brussels, Belgium ===
- Andorra
- Barbados
- Bhutan
- Belize
- Dominica
- Eswatini
- Gambia
- Guinea-Bissau
- Grenada
- Guyana
- Samoa
- São Tomé and Príncipe
- Solomon Islands
- Trinidad and Tobago
- Vanuatu

=== Resident in London, United Kingdom ===
- Antigua and Barbuda
- Bahamas
- Fiji
- Saint Kitts and Nevis
- Saint Lucia
- Seychelles
- Tonga

=== Other Resident Cities ===
- Central African Republic (Paris)
- Comoros (Paris)
- Nicaragua (Vienna)
- Palau (Washington, D.C.)
- Papua New Guinea (Singapore)
- San Marino (San Marino)
- Suriname (The Hague)

== Closed missions ==
Host city	Sending country	Mission	Year closed	Ref.
Berlin	Benin	Embassy	2021	
Berlin	Guinea-Bissau	Embassy (Note: Resident in Brussels, Belgium)	2020	
Berlin	Nicaragua	Embassy (Note: Resident in Vienna, Austria)	2024	
Berlin	South Korea	Consulate-General	1999	
Berlin	Sweden	Consulate-General (West Berlin)	1994	
Baden-Baden	France	Consulate	1992	
Bonn	Austria	Embassy branch office	2006	
Bonn	Belarus	Embassy branch office	2014	
Bonn	Bulgaria	Embassy branch office	2012	
Bonn	Colombia	Consulate-General	2002	
Bonn	Czechia	Consulate-General	2008	
Bonn	East Germany (Note: The permanent mission of the Democratic Republic of Germany (GDR), also known as East Germany, closed upon the reunification of Germany in 1990, which saw the GDR's dissolution.)	Permanent Mission	1990	
Bonn	Indonesia	Embassy branch office	2003	
Bonn	Israel	Embassy branch office	2000	
Bonn	Italy	Embassy branch office	2002	
Bonn	Japan	Embassy branch office	2002	
Bonn	Kyrgyzstan	Embassy branch office	2023	
Bonn	Libya	Embassy branch office	2018	
Bonn	Philippines	Embassy branch office	2008	
Bonn	Russia	Consulate-General	2026	
Bonn	Slovakia	Embassy branch office	2010	
Bonn	Somalia	Embassy	2000	
Bonn	Sri Lanka	Consulate-General	2007	
Bonn	United Arab Emirates	Consulate-General (Note: Originally an extension office of the embassy in Berlin, was converted into a consulate-general in 2018.)	Unknown (Note: The consulate-general was closed sometime before 2026.)	
Bonn	United Kingdom	Embassy branch office	2002	
Bonn	Ukraine	Embassy branch office	2005	
Bremen	United States	Consular agency	2018	
Cologne	Belgium	Consulate-General	2015	
Cologne	Greece	Consulate-General	2011	
Frankfurt	Angola	Consulate-General	2018	
Frankfurt	Iran	Consulate-General	2024	
Frankfurt	Portugal	Vice-consulate	2012	
Frankfurt	Sweden	Consulate-General	1993	
Frankfurt	United Kingdom	Consulate-General	2006	
Frankfurt	Venezuela	Consulate-General	Unknown	
Düsseldorf	Austria	Consulate-General	2000	
Düsseldorf	Slovenia	Consulate	2012	
Düsseldorf	Tunisia	Consulate-General	2006	
Freiburg im Breisgau	France	Consulate	1992	
Hamburg	Austria	Consulate-General	2010	
Hamburg	Canada	Consulate-General		
Hamburg	Colombia	Consulate-General	2002	
Hamburg	Finland	Consulate-General	2013	
Hamburg	Iran	Consulate-General	2024	
Hamburg	Ireland	Consulate-General	1982	
Hamburg	Italy	Consulate-General	2010	
Hamburg	Liberia	Consulate-General		
Hamburg	Netherlands	Consulate-General	2009	
Hamburg	Norway	Consulate-General	2012	
Hamburg	Philippines	Consulate-General	2009	
Hamburg	Sweden	Consulate-General	2009	
Hamburg	Switzerland	Consulate-General	2009	
Hamburg	United Kingdom	Consulate-General	2006	
Hamburg	Venezuela	Consulate-General	2019	
Hanover	Greece	Consulate General	2011	
Hanover	Spain	Consulate-General	2011	
Leipzig	France	Consulate-General	1999	
Leipzig	Greece	Consulate-General	2011	
Leipzig	Poland	Consulate-General	2008	
Leipzig	United Kingdom	Consulate-General	2006	
Mainz	France	Consulate-General	1999	
Mannheim	Italy	Consulate	2010	
Munich	Colombia	Consulate-General	2002	
Munich	Iran	Consulate-General	2024	
Munich	Sweden	Consulate-General	1993	
Nuremberg	Italy	Consulate	2010	
Osnabrück	Portugal	Vice-consulate	2012	
Saarbrücken	Italy	Consulate	2010	
Stuttgart	United Kingdom	Consulate-General	2006	

== See also ==
- Foreign relations of Germany
- List of diplomatic missions of Germany
- Visa requirements for German citizens
