= Flag of Franconia =

Flag of Franconia

The flag of Franconia (German: Frankenfahne or Frankenflagge) is a symbol of Franconia, a region in North Bavaria and parts of Thuringia, Hesse and Baden-Württemberg in Germany.

== Description ==
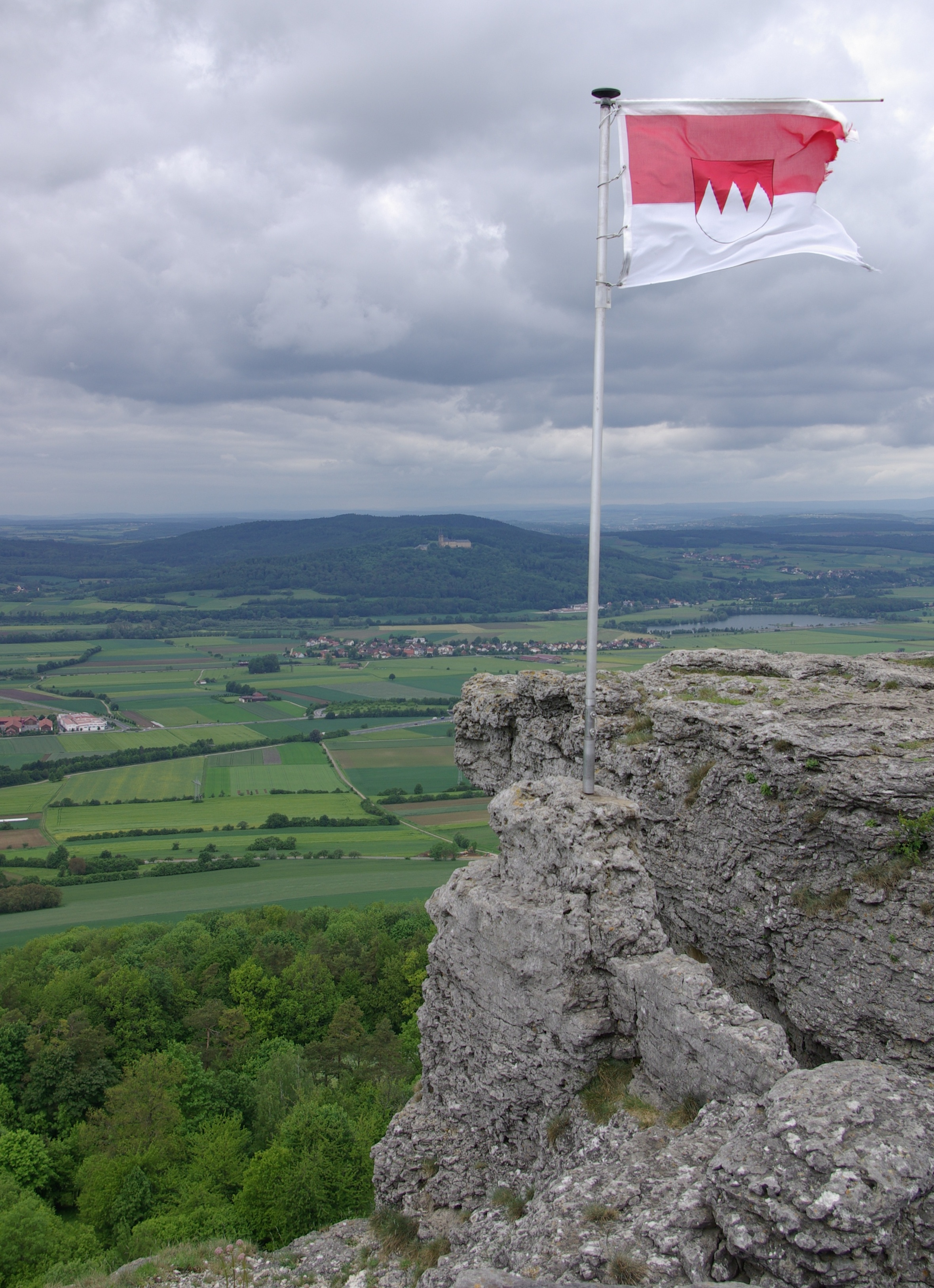
Franconian flag on the crags of Staffelberg

The flag consists of two horizontal bands of equal thickness, the upper one is red, the lower one is white or heraldic silver. The Franconian Rake is usually placed in the centre. Also common is the word Franken ("Franconia") in white letters on a black field above the rake. Although not official, the Franconian Rake is also commonly used as a banner of arms, replacing the horizontal bands with the rake. The Franconian flag is neither a state symbol nor an emblem of sovereignty because Franconia is only a geographical or cultural region, not an administrative unit. It is used mainly on festival days or for similar purposes by private individuals and clubs. On Franconia Day, it may also be hoisted by the authorities. In the Franconian provinces, the coats of arms of the respective provinces (Upper, Middle or Lower Franconia) may take the place of the Franconian Rake. The flag is also sometimes seen incorrectly with the colours reversed.

== History ==
The flag takes its colours from the so-called Franconian Rake. This coat of arms first surfaced in the early 14th century on the gravestone of the prince-bishop of Würzburg, Wolfram Wolfskeel von Grumbach, as well as on a seal for the village of Gerolzhofen. It was a symbol of Franconian ducal sovereignty, which was nominally held by the prince-bishops of Würzburg. The field banners of the contingents of soldiers of the Franconian Circle within the Imperial Army of the Holy Roman Empire also bore these colours. The flag was, however, not a symbol of the whole of Franconia because it was never a separate state. When, in 1835, a new Bavarian coat of arms was introduced, the officials responsible for the task ensured that the Franconian territories were recognised. They chose the Franconian Rake as the emblem of the whole of Franconia, which has since been integrated into the armorial achievement.

== Flag dispute ==
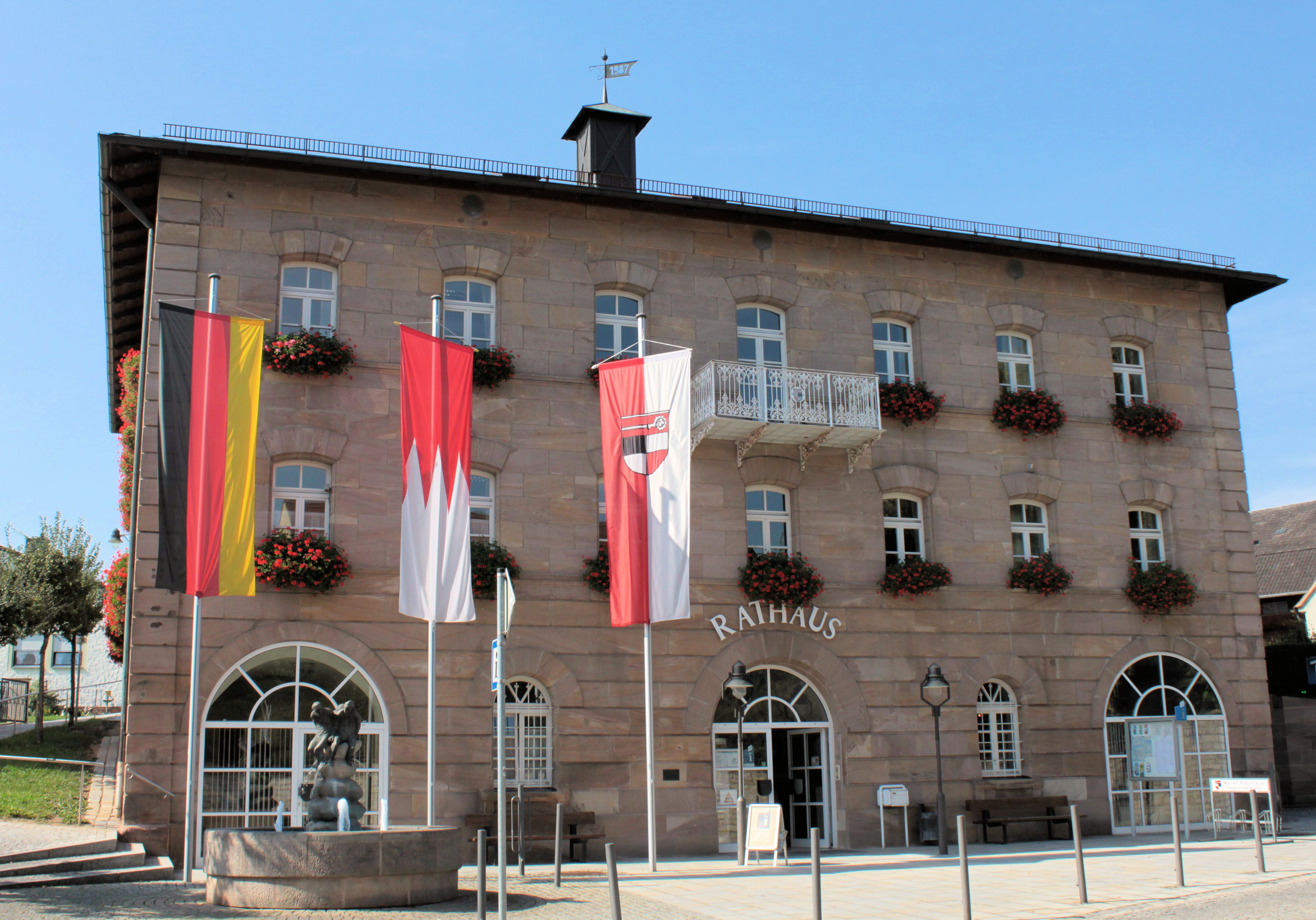
The Franconian flag at half mast in front of Pleinfeld town hall in the county of Weißenburg-Gunzenhausen, Middle Franconia

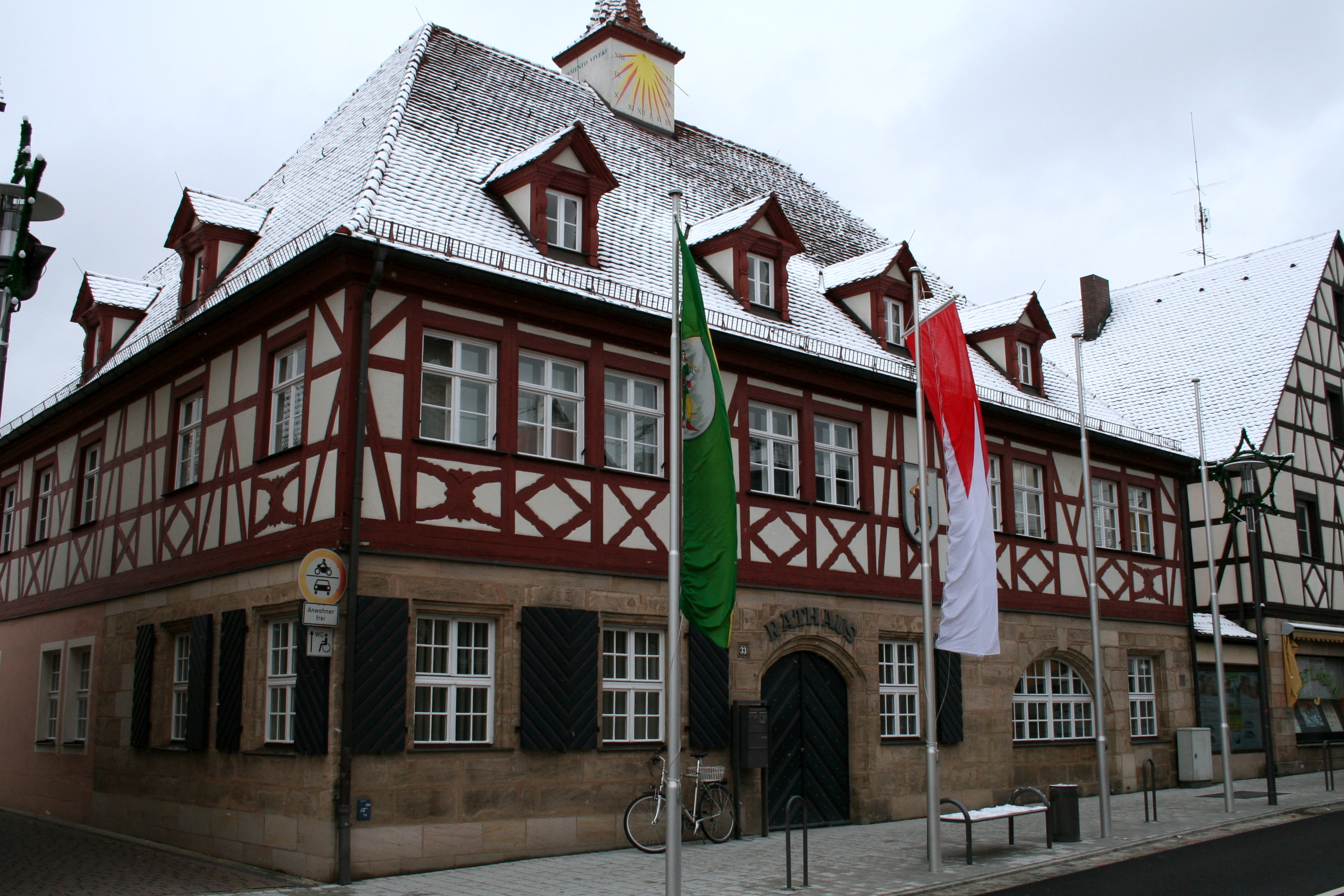
The Franconian flag in front of the town hall of Feucht, Nürnberger Land, Middle Franconia

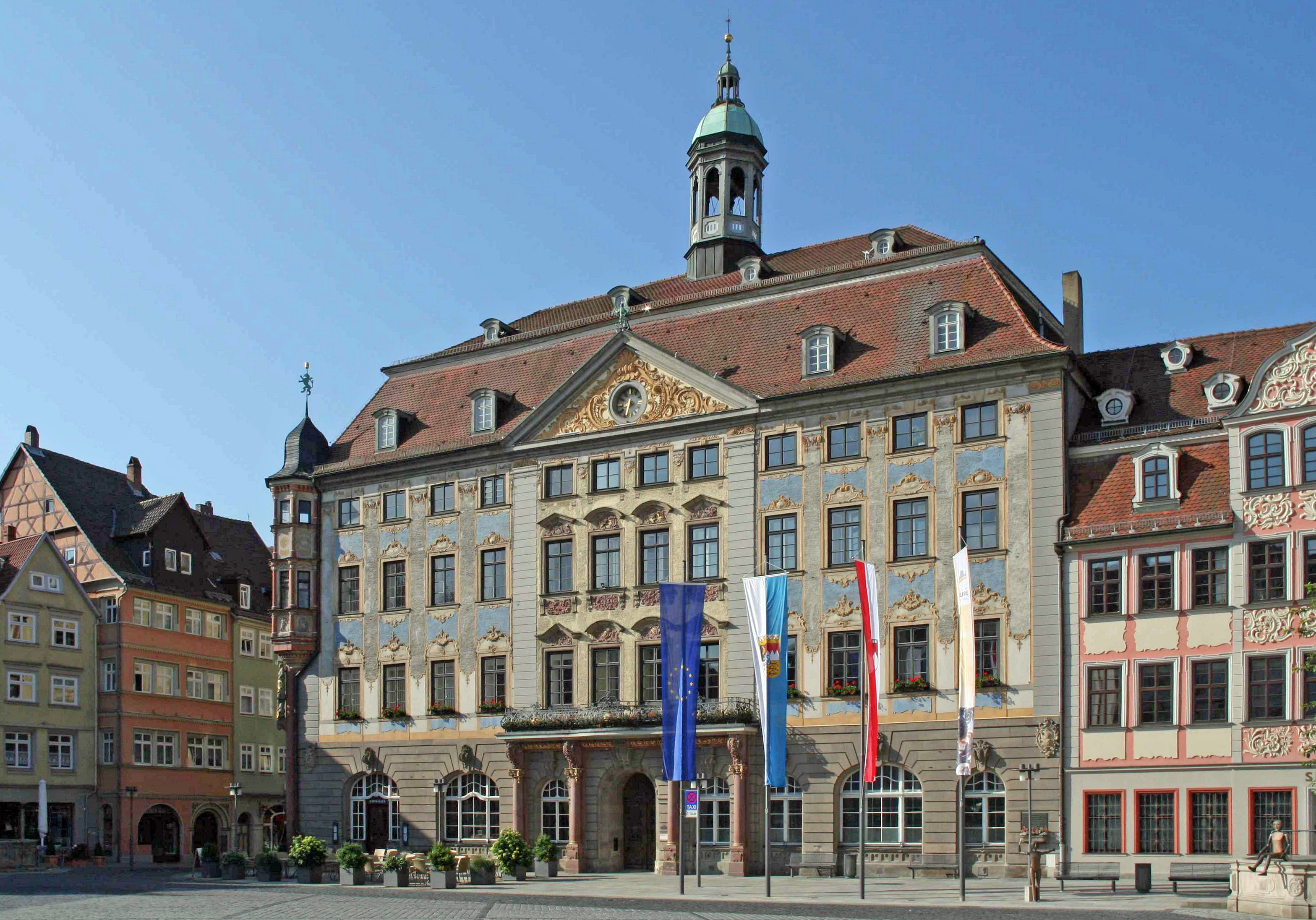
The Franconian flag in front of the town hall of Coburg, Upper Franconia

With the introduction of Franconia Day, there has been pressure to fly the Franconian flag on public buildings. But because it is not a state flag, this request was refused by the Bavarian state parliament, the Landtag. However, the constitutional committee of the Landtag decided in 2012 that the flag could be hoisted for advertising purposes on public buildings alongside the flag of Germany, the Bavarian state flag and the flag of Europe, because the state was neither able nor permitted to make a ruling.

There were more arguments over the flags on Nuremberg Castle. In 2008 a Bavarian flag was hoisted on the castle for the first time. This was taken as an affront by many of the locals. SPD members of parliament demanded that the Free State also display the Franconian flag on the castle. This demand was rejected, however, by the Bavarian Interior Minister, Joachim Herrmann. In the summer of 2009, Lord Mayor Ulrich Maly escalated the flag dispute by allowing the Nuremberg municipal flag to be raised alongside the German and Bavarian flags. Because it is also red and white, the version without the city coat of arms resembles the Franconian flag. Including the requisite additional eight-metre-high flagpole, the cost came to €25,000. In summer 2012 the flags were changed again: on the palas, the main building of the castle, the German flag was replaced by a Bavarian flag. On the flagpole where this Bavarian flag had hitherto been hoisted (the Heidenturm tower), a Franconian flag was now displayed. The flag of Germany now fluttered on a pole erected for it in the open.

The Franconian flag is also used as a symbol by the Franconia football team.
