= Schloss Ermreuth =

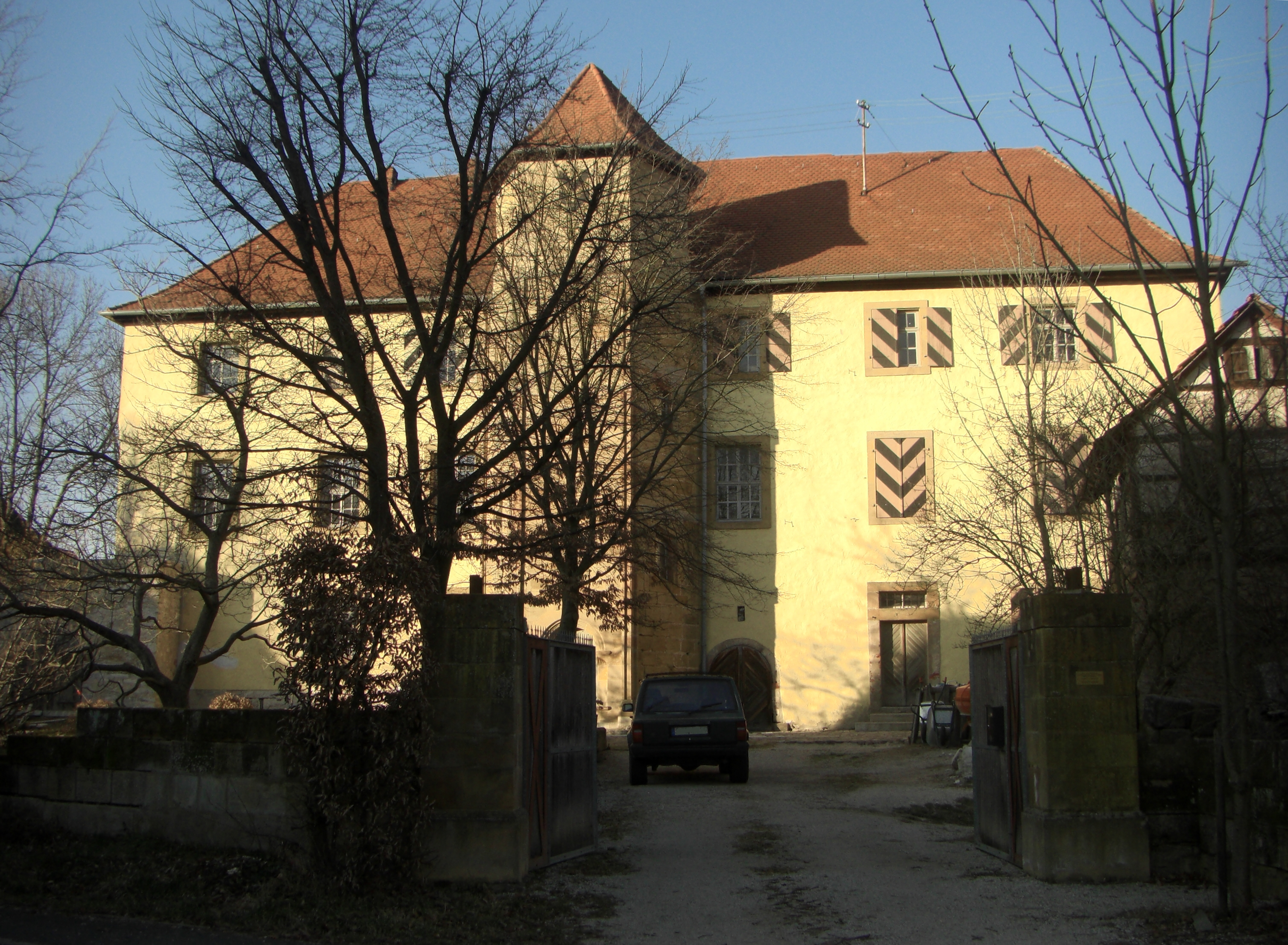
- Schloss Ermreuth, 2008

General information
- Type: Manor House
- Location: Ermreuth, Germany
- Coordinates: 49°38′25″N 11°11′26″E
- Current tenants: Karl-Heinz Hoffmann
- Named for: Ermreuth
- Completed: 1525

Technical details
- Floor count: 3

Schloss Ermreuth is a manor house (Rittergut) in the Upper Franconian village of Ermreuth in the municipality of Neunkirchen am Brand. The three-storey hipped roof building was owned by various Franconian noble families in the Middle Ages and Early Modern Period. From 1926 the estate was used as a meeting point and training establishment for leading Nazis and, since 1980, has been the residence of right-wing extremist, Karl-Heinz Hoffmann.

== History ==
=== 14th to 19th centuries ===
Predecessor buildings on the site of the manor are recorded even before 1358. In 1525 rebellious peasants burnt down the castle. The locksmith, Stefan Muffel, from the Nuremberg patrician family Muffel suppressed the insurrection and rebuilt the house. In 1573 and 1579-1622, the estate belonged to the Stiebars, who built today's palace building with its staircase tower around 1600. After ten years of ownership by the House of Wildenstein, the castle was sold to the Künsbergs in 1632, who, in the eighteenth century, added the upper floor, raised the staircase and built a roof terrace with a parapet. According to an old legend, a black mare also lives here, who waits for people to go past the house in the darkness, sits on their back and oppresses them. In 1858 the Künsbergs sold the manor to the owner of the hammer mill, Andreas Schäff, From Erlangen.

=== 20th and 21st centuries ===
After the First World War, the castle was used by the organization Der Stahlhelm as a meeting centre. In honour of General Ludendorff, who visited here as a guest, the Nazi hiking club, Ermreuth e.V., set up a Ludendorff home from 1926 onwards. In the Nazi era, a NSDAP Gauführer school was established here in 1935, whose members were probably involved in the desecration of the Jewish Cemetery in Ermreuth which had been opened in 1711. At that time, the editor of the Nazi newspaper, Der Stürmer, Julius Streicher, was frequently a guest at the manor.

Immediately after the Second World War, refugees and expellees were placed in the castle from the German eastern territories. After their departure, it became temporarily a home for the Heimkehrer and then, until the end of the 1970s, it was old people's home run by the Bavarian Red Cross.

In 1978, Schloss Ermreuth became the headquarters of the Wehrsportgruppe Hoffmann, a Neonazi terrorist group founded in 1973, and the residence of Karl-Heinz Hoffmann, founder of the Wehrsportgruppe after his partner, Franziska Birkmann, had bought it. As a result of the ban on the Wehrsportgruppe in January 1980, a house search was conducted in the manor, and propaganda material and weapons were confiscated. Uwe Behrendt, deputy chairman of Hoffmanns Wehrsportgruppe and murderer of Shlomo Levin, former chairman of the Israeli religious community in Nuremberg and his life companion Frieda Poeschke, also lived here and escaped to Lebanon after the double killing in December 1980. After Die Wende, Hoffmann worked for several years as an investor in Thuringian Kahla and returned to Ermreuth around 2000. The present owner of the manor is not known.

On the Day of the Tag des offenen Denkmals in 2016, the manor was struck off the programme at the direction of the intelligence services.

Despite that, there were guided tours by Hoffmann with very positive feedback according to a newspaper report on Franconia Day.
