= Embassy of Syria, Berlin =

Embassy of the Syrian Arab Republic in Berlin سفارة الجمهورية العربية السورية في برلين Botschaft der Arabischen Republik Syrien
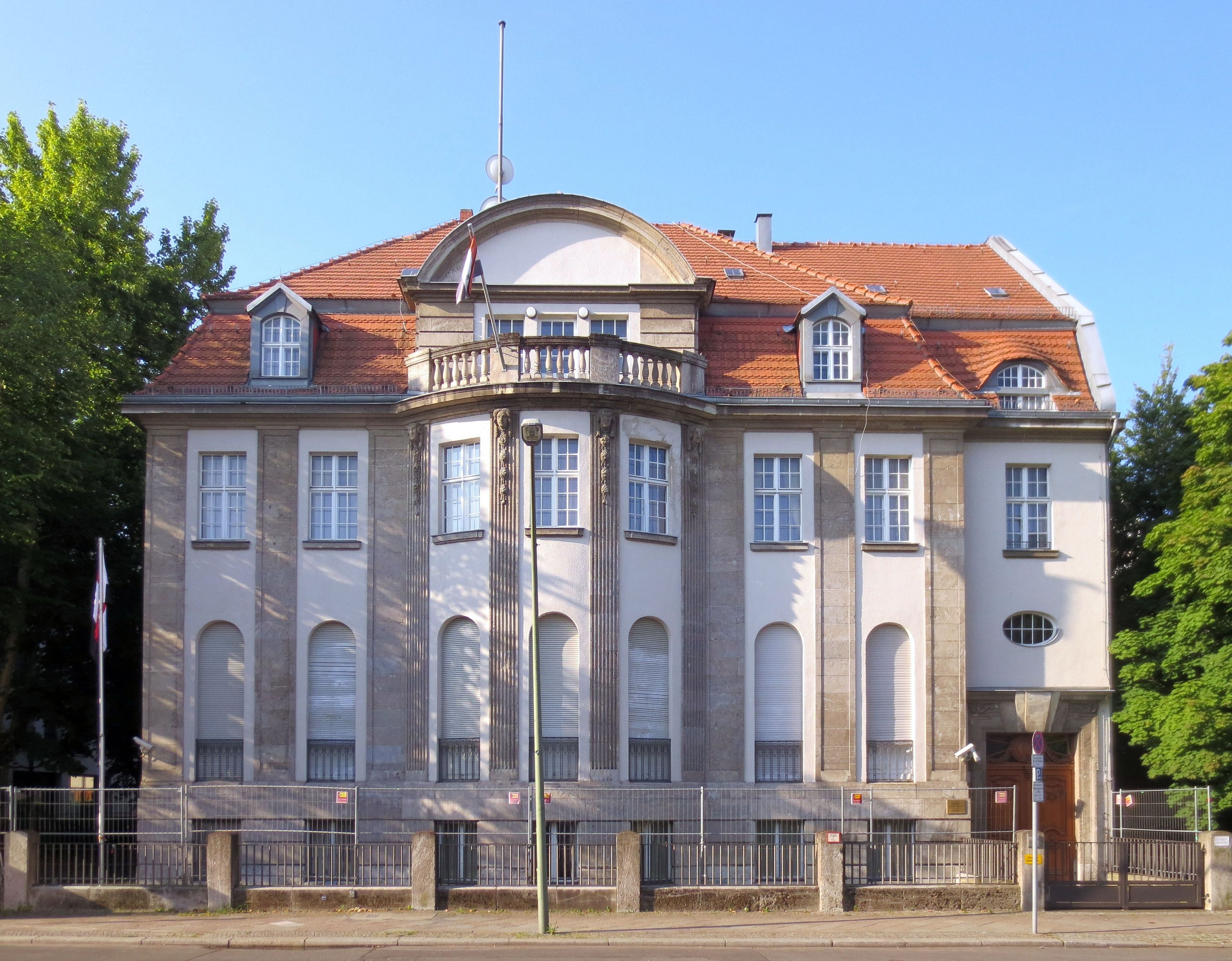
- Location: Berlin
- Address: Syrische Botschaft; Rauchstraße 25; 10787 Tiergarten, Berlin; Germany
- Coordinates: 52.5083°N 13.3502°E
- Opening: 2003; 23 years ago (current embassy)
- Chargé d'affaires: Abdulkareem Khwanda
- Website: mofaex.gov.sy/berlin-embassy/

The Embassy of Syria in Berlin (Arabic: سفارة الجمهورية العربية السورية في برلين) is the diplomatic mission of the Syrian Arab Republic in Germany. It is located at Rauchstraße 25 in Berlin.

Germany expelled the ambassador for the Syrian Arab Republic in May 2012, and expelled the remaining four embassy staff later that year. It was reopened in 2020, and now operates normally with representation at the chargé d'affaires level.

== Building ==
The villa at Rauchstrasse 25 is the only building in the block that survived bomb warfare in WW2 and post-war reconstruction. The city palace was built in 1912 according to plans by Georg Albert Rathenau and Friedrich August Hartmann in neoclassical style. The building has a basement, two full floors and a converted attic with dormer windows under the mansard roof. Wide pilasters made of shell limestone, which are decorated with architectural decorations, rise above the low basement. The central axis of the façade is designed as a central avant-corps that curves towards the street and is closed off by a balcony on the top floor.

The building was remodeled between 2002 and 2003 and now houses the Syrian Embassy. The conversion architect was Abdalrahman Mahamid. The representative rooms are on the first full floor, offices and administration are one floor above. An extension was added to the old building.

== See also ==
- List of diplomatic missions in Germany
- Germany–Syria relations
