= Germany–Syria relations =

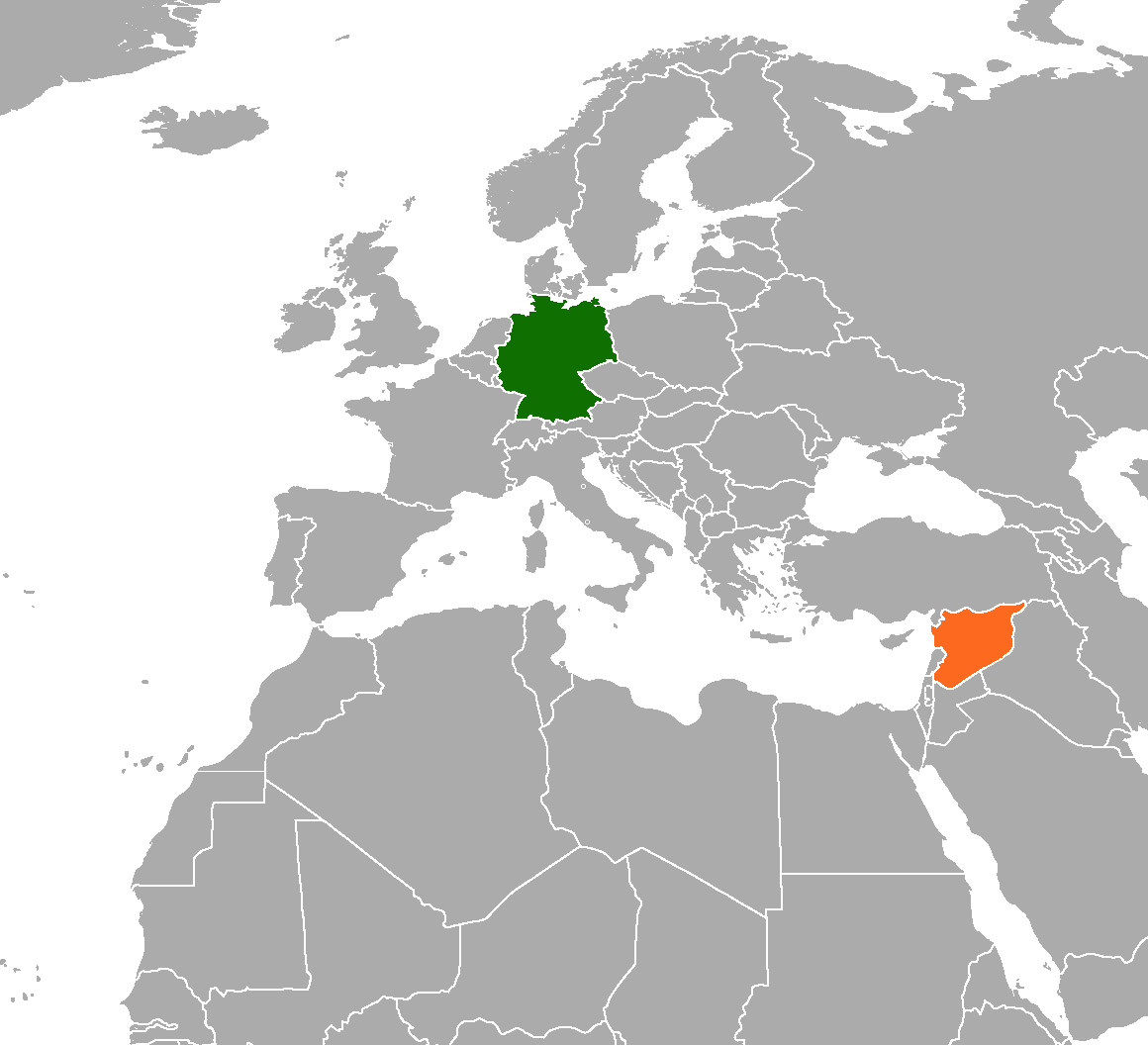

- Germany: Syria

Germany–Syria relations are the bilateral relations between the Federal Republic of Germany and the Syrian Arab Republic. Germany closed its Damascus embassy and stopped its recognition of Bashar al-Assad in 2012 because of the Syrian civil war, but did not cut relations with the former Ba'athist regime until its official collapse in late 2024.

== History ==
=== 20th century ===
In 1927, the Weimar Republic established a consulate to represent its interests in Lebanon and Syria. In 1934, the consulate was transformed into a consulate general. During the Second World War, Syria was briefly controlled by Nazi Germany, but was liberated by British and anti-German French forces in 1941 in the Syria–Lebanon campaign. After the war, Syria declared independence on April 17, 1946. Former officers of the Wehrmacht were involved as advisors in building up the Syrian Armed Forces. In 1952, diplomatic relations were established between Syria and the Federal Republic of Germany (FRG). At the time of the United Arab Republic (1958–1961), Syria operated a joint embassy in Bonn with Egypt under Nasser.

After the FRG's diplomatic recognition of Israel in 1965, Syria severed diplomatic relations with the FRG. Instead, informal relations with the German Democratic Republic (GDR) were expanded, and by the mid-1960s the two countries had become close partners even before official diplomatic relations were established in 1969. The GDR provided extensive economic aid to Syria, which was ruled by the Baath Party. For example, GDR advisors helped establish a centrally-planned economy in Syria, and Syrian security forces were trained by the Ministry of State Security and their Syrian equivalents were modeled on the GDR, influencing the Syrian state into the 21st century. With the coming to power of the less socialist oriented Syrian nationalist Hafez al-Assad in 1970, relations with the GDR were eventually scaled back, and relations with the FRG were resumed in 1974.

=== 21st century ===
In 2001, Syrian President Bashar al-Assad visited German Chancellor Gerhard Schröder on a state visit in Berlin. The meeting was about a peace plan for the Middle East conflict and German development aid. German Development Minister Heidemarie Wieczorek-Zeul proclaimed the motto "change through cooperation". After German Reunification, Syria moved its embassy from Bonn to Berlin in 2002/03.

==== Syrian civil war ====
With the start of the civil war in Syria in 2011, the German embassy in Damascus was closed in 2012. Germany joined economic sanctions against the Assad regime and cut diplomatic contacts with the Syrian government to a minimum. In addition, several Syrian diplomats were expelled from the country, including the Syrian ambassador to Germany in May 2012 after the Massacre of Hula. Unlike other Western countries such as the United States, however, diplomatic relations were not severed. In the context of the crisis in Syria, Germany provided billions of dollars in humanitarian assistance and took in large numbers of Syrian refugees itself.

On December 4, 2015, the Bundestag voted to authorize the participation of the Bundeswehr in the international anti-ISIL coalition in Syria, which ended in January 2021. The Berlin Prosecutor General's Office opened an investigation at the end of January 2017 into allegations that the Syrian embassy in Berlin had issued passports without verification but with an extra fee. In February 2021, Assad supporter Eyad A. was sentenced by a Regional Court to four and a half years in prison for war crimes committed in the Syrian civil war, marking the first international conviction for charges involving "crimes against humanity" committed by individual linked to the Government of Syria during the war.

In January 2022, a German court in Koblenz sentenced Syrian officer Anwar Raslan to life imprisonment, declaring him guilty over crimes against humanity. Anwar Raslan had served as a colonel under the notorious Branch 251 of Ba'athist General Intelligence Directorate and was charged with organizing large-scale torture, rape, sexual violence against detainees and in the killing of 58 individuals. In July 2023, German police basted a major captagon network in the southern state of Bavaria, run by two Syrian-born men who were involved in production and smuggling of captagon.

==== Post-Assad regime ====
When the Assad regime collapsed in December 2024, Germany, along with a number of European states, had suspended asylum applications for Syrian migrants. At the same time, several exiled Syrians living in Germany also celebrated the fall of the Assad family.

Germany's Foreign Minister Annalena Baerbock said that Bashar al-Assad "must finally be held accountable" for his atrocities against the Syrian people. She warned supporters of the Assad regime, saying "To any of Assad’s torturers who might be considering fleeing to Germany now, I can only say clearly: We will bring all the regime’s henchmen to account for their terrible crimes with the full force of the law."

On January 3, 2025, Annalena Baerbock became one of the first European Union diplomats to travel to Damascus after the fall of Assad, in which she met with Ahmed al-Sharaa, leader of Hay'at Tahrir al-Sham, as well as the Syrian Transitional Government and representatives of Syrian civil society to discuss a new political beginning. Despite shaking hands with his French counterpart Jean-Noël Barrot, Ahmed al-Sharaa did not shake hands with Baerbock. During her visit, she stated that Europe would support Syria's transition but would not fund the establishment of new Islamist structures. On January 12, Baerbock pledged €50 million in food, emergency shelters, and medical care to Syria following talks with the Syrian Transitional Government in Riyadh, Saudi Arabia. In March 2025, Germany pledged €300 million in aid towards stabilizing Syria and its humanitarian situation. On 20 March 2025, Germany reopened its embassy in Damascus.

On 12 January 2026, Asaad al-Shaibani, the Syrian Foreign Minister, raised the new flag of the Syrian Arab Republic above the Consulate General of Syria, Bonn, to mark the official reopening of the Syrian Consulate. Two months later, on 30 March, Syrian President Ahmed al-Sharaa visited Berlin, where he met with President Frank-Walter Steinmeier and Chancellor Friedrich Merz. The visit included talks with a German government and business delegation, focusing on Syria's reconstruction, refugee return, and economic cooperation.

== Migration ==
Major migration between the countries first occurred in the 1960s as part of the close partnership between East Germany and Syria. A total of 4000 Syrian students studied in West and East Germany, and in 2009, 22 percent of professors at the University of Damascus had a German degree. In 2009, there were about 30,000 Syrians living in Germany. More than six million Syrians have left their homes as part of the civil war in the country. In 2021, there were approximately 868,000 people from Syria living in Germany, the vast majority of whom arrived in the country as part of the Refugee Crisis 2015/2016. Well-known German-Syrians include political scientist Bassam Tibi, politician Lamya Kaddor and football player Mahmoud Dahoud.

== Economic relations ==
Syria's economic performance plummeted with the start of the civil war in 2011, and the country was placed under sanctions by Western industrialized countries. Economic relations with Germany are therefore weak. The bilateral trade volume amounted to only 60 million euros in 2021.

Before the civil war, Syria was a major tourist destination due to its cultural sites and was also visited by many Germans. Since 2019, some tourists from Germany have been traveling to the country again, despite travel warnings.

== Humanitarian aid ==
Since the beginning of the Syrian civil war, Germany has provided humanitarian aid amounting to more than 10 billion euros up to 2022, making it one of the leading donor countries. The German government has worked with partners such as the United Nations World Food Programme, the Red Cross, and Save the Children. The focus has been on supporting refugees in Syria and neighboring countries. Aid was also provided to stabilize regions in northern Syria that had been occupied by the Islamic State.

== Diplomatic missions ==
- Germany has an embassy in Damascus.
- Syria has an Embassy in Berlin and honorary consulate in Bremen.
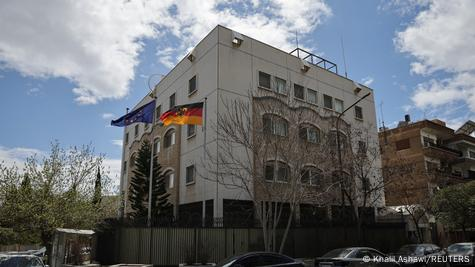
German Embassy in Damascus

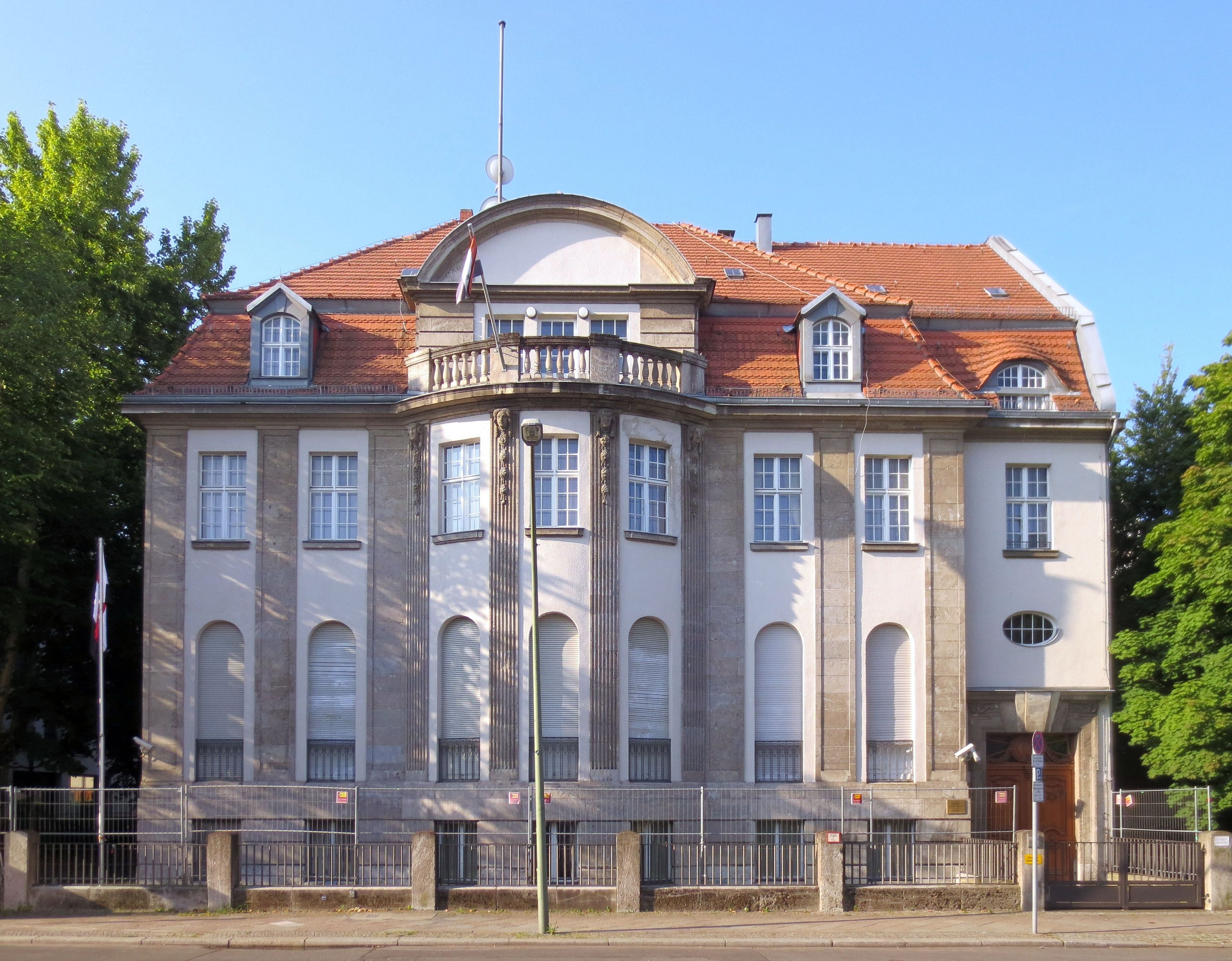
Syrian Embassy in Berlin.

== See also ==
- Foreign relations of Germany
- Foreign relations of Syria
- Syria-EU relations
- AL-EU relations
- Syrians in Germany
