= Ahmed Alattar =

Emirati diplomat

Ahmed Waheeb Maaz Ahmed Alattar
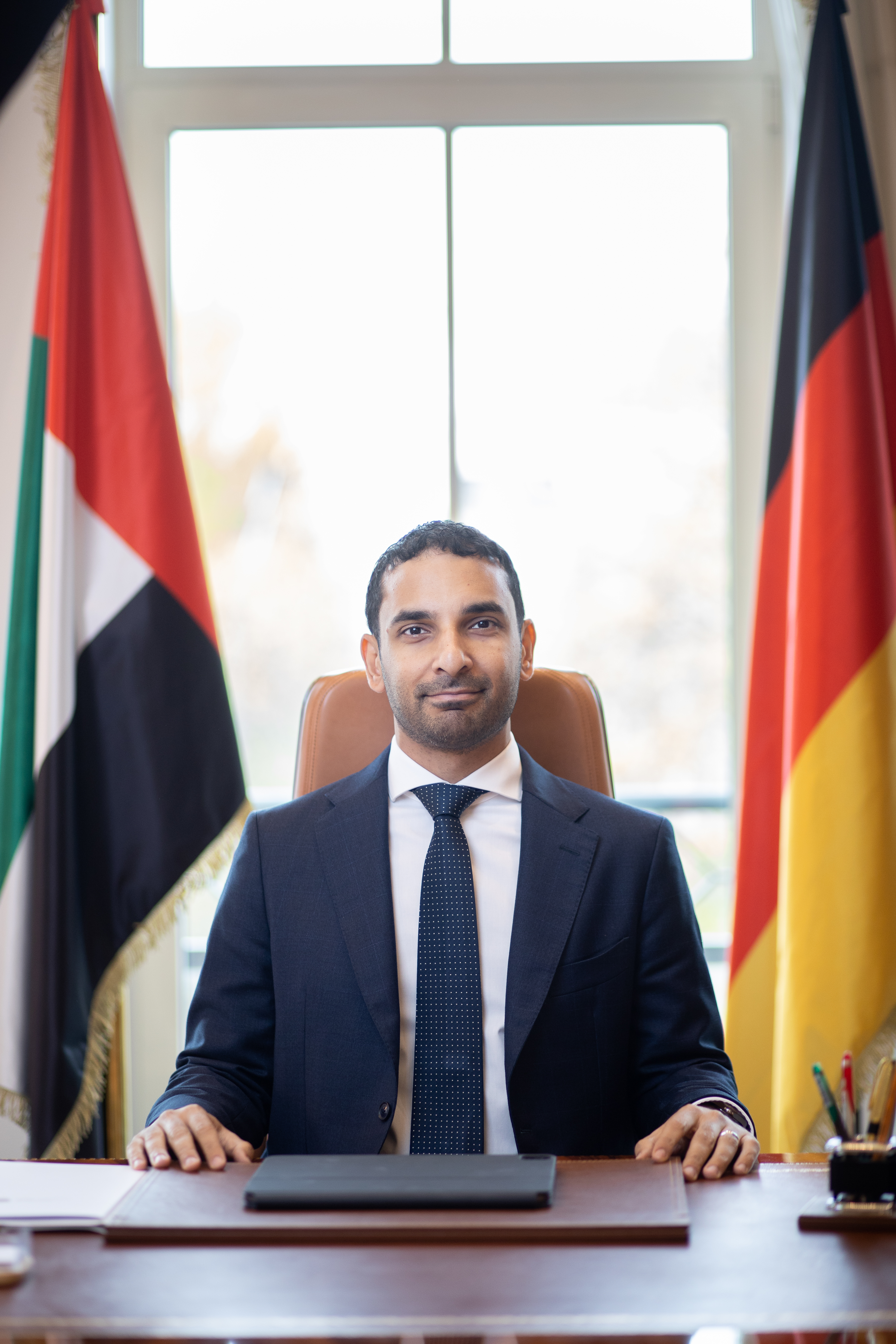
- Alattar in 2022

UAE Ambassador to Germany
- Incumbent
- Assumed office 24 October 2022
- President: Mohammed bin Zayed Al Nahyan
- Preceded by: Hafsa Al Ulama, Ali Al Ahmed

Personal details
- Born: 8 February 1986 (age 40) Abu Dhabi, UAE
- Website: Embassy of the United Arab Emirates Berlin

Ahmed Alattar (Arabic: أحمد العطار, 8 February 1986) is an Emirati diplomat and who has served as the current United Arab Emirates ambassador to the Federal Republic of Germany since 24 October 2022.

== Early life and education ==
Ahmed Alattar was born in Abu Dhabi, United Arab Emirates in 1986. He graduated from Khalifa University with a Bachelor of Science in Petroleum Geosciences in 2009, before completing a master's degree in international security from the University College London and an EMBA from the Institut Européen d'Administration des Affaires (INSEAD) in France.

== Career ==
=== Early career ===
Alattar began his professional career in 2009 at the energy company Abu Dhabi National Oil Company (ADNOC) at its onshore oil Explorations operations unit, before serving in the UAE military in 2012 and deploying to Afghanistan as part of the International Security Assistance Force (ISAF) before working for a public foundation and creating various startups in London.

=== Diplomacy ===
Alattar began working at the UAE's Ministry of Foreign Affairs and International Cooperation as an Advisor to the Minister of Foreign Affairs in 2017. From 2018 to 2020, he served as the UAE's Deputy Director for European Affairs and as Chief of Staff to the Foreign Minister from 2020 to 2022.

In October 2022, Alattar presented his credentials as Ambassador of the United Arab Emirates to the Federal Republic of Germany to President Frank-Walter Steinmeier.

=== Personal life ===
Alattar resides in Berlin, Germany with his wife and two children. He is fluent in five languages, including English, German, Arabic, Italian and Spanish.

== See also ==
- Germany — United Arab Emirates relations
- Foreign relations of the United Arab Emirates
- Ministry of Foreign Affairs and International Cooperation of the United Arab Emirates
