= Consulate General of Syria, Bonn =

Consular Representation of the Syrian Arab Republic in Germany

Consulate General of Syria, Bonn القنصلية العامة السورية في بون Syrisches Generalkonsulat in Bonn
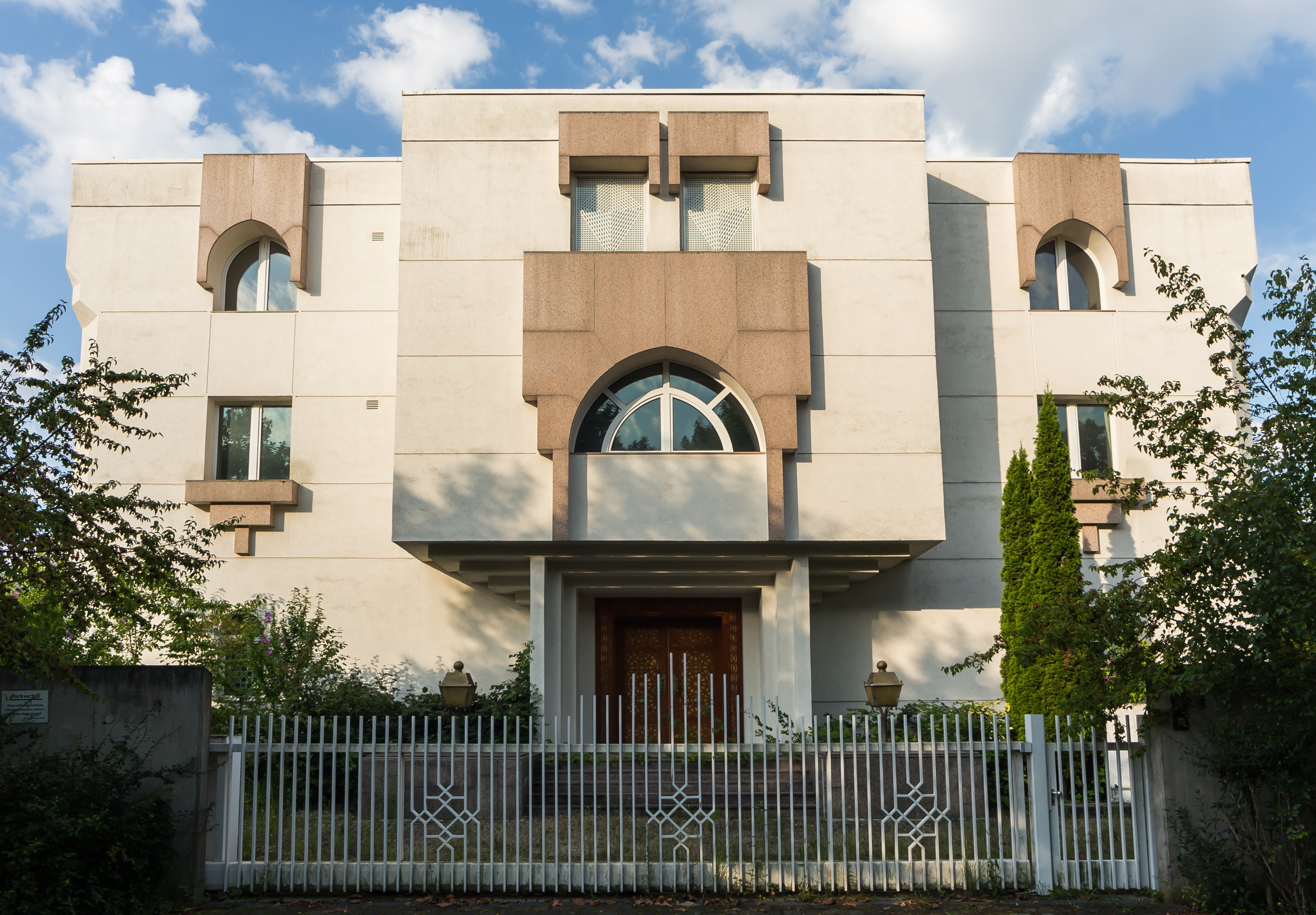
- Location: Bonn, Germany
- Address: Andreas-Hermes-Straße 5, 53175 Bonn, Germany
- Coordinates: 50.70445°N 7.14742°E
- Opened: 13 February 2026
- Consul General: Vacant

The Consulate General of Syria, Bonn is the diplomatic mission of the Syrian Arab Republic in Bonn. The Consulate General is located in the former Syrian Embassy building in Bonn’s government district, near Rheinaue Park. The building had been unused for several years. Following the fall of the Assad regime, the transitional government reopened the Syrian Consulate.

== History ==
=== Diplomatic Relations and Initial Legation (1953–1961) ===
After establishing diplomatic relations with the West Germany in 1953, Syria opened a legation at the seat of government in Bonn, which was initially housed at the former location of the Syrian Consulate General in the Cologne district of Marienburg. It moved shortly thereafter by 1954 to Bad Godesberg, the main hub of diplomatic missions. With the union of Syria and Egypt to form the United Arab Republic (UAR) in 1958, the former Syrian legation was converted into a joint embassy of both countries. After the dissolution of the union in 1961, the building no longer housed the Syrian mission but the Egyptian representation instead. Since then, the Syrian Arab Republic maintained its embassy at Villa Rheinallee 9, with a military department located in the Südstadt district. While Syria’s diplomatic relations with the West Germany were suspended from 13 May 1965 following its recognition of Israel, the Embassy of Pakistan carried out Syria’s affairs from that location through an Interests Section of the Syrian Arab Republic.

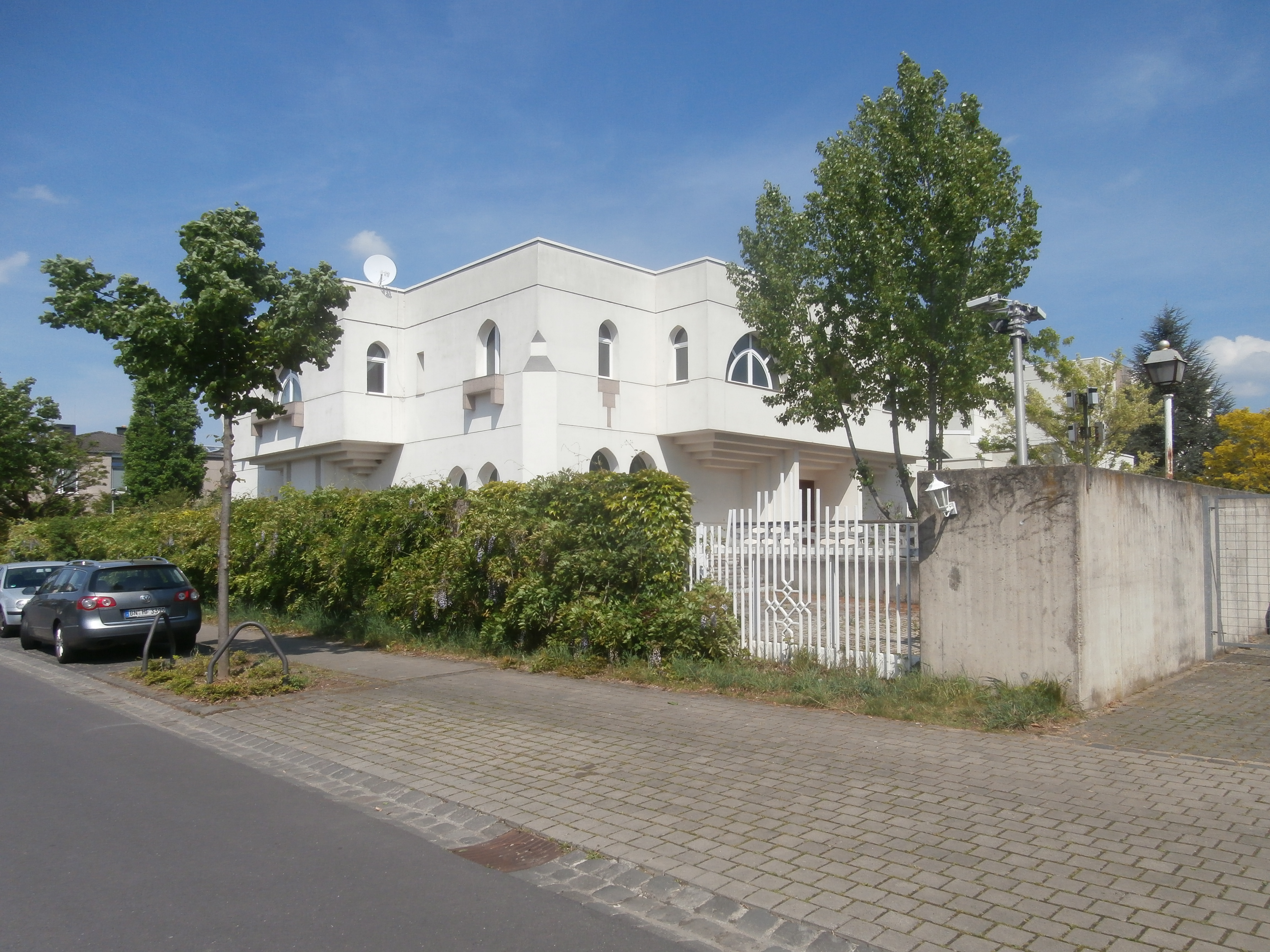
Former residence building of the Syrian Embassy, 2014

=== Reopening and New Embassy in Bad Godesberg (1974–2002) ===
With the resumption of relations on 7 August 1974, Syria reopened an embassy, which was once again based in Bad Godesberg. Initially, the embassy was headed by a legation counsellor serving as chargé d’affaires ad interim. The embassy residence, which became the home of the ambassador, was located in the Muffendorf district. In the 1980s, Syria built a new embassy near Rheinauen Park in Bonn, completed in spring 1990. Designed by N. Kasri with interiors by M. W. Seirawan and guidance from Ambassador Suleyman Haddad, it cost 14 million Deutsche Mark (about 8.3 million USD), housed 30 staff, and was the only finished embassy in the district. In the course of the government’s move to Berlin in 1999, the Syrian embassy relocated there in March 2002. Since then, it has occasionally been used for events by the German-Syrian Society while remaining the property of Syria. In 2005, the Syrian government decided to set up a Consulate General as well as a Culture and Tourism Center in the building. However, the implementation of this decision was made dependent on funding from the start and has not taken place.

=== Protests, Monument Status, and Reopening of the Consulate (2011–present) ===
Since the start of the civil war in Syria in 2011, opposition supporters repeatedly demonstrated in front of the building, which was also stormed by Kurds during one such demonstration in November 2012. In June 2017, it became known that Syria, contrary to earlier plans, intended to sell the property through a two-month bidding process.

The Rhineland-Palatinate General Directorate for Cultural Heritage has since recognized the former embassy building as a historic monument as of 2024.

In October 2025, a Syrian foreign ministry delegation arrived in Bonn to finalize preparations for reopening Damascus’s consulate general, according to the state-run Syrian Arab News Agency. On 12 January 2026, Asaad al-Shaibani, the Syrian Foreign Minister, raised the new flag of the Syrian Arab Republic above the chancery to mark the Consulate-General's official reopening.
