= Embassy of Bangladesh, Berlin =

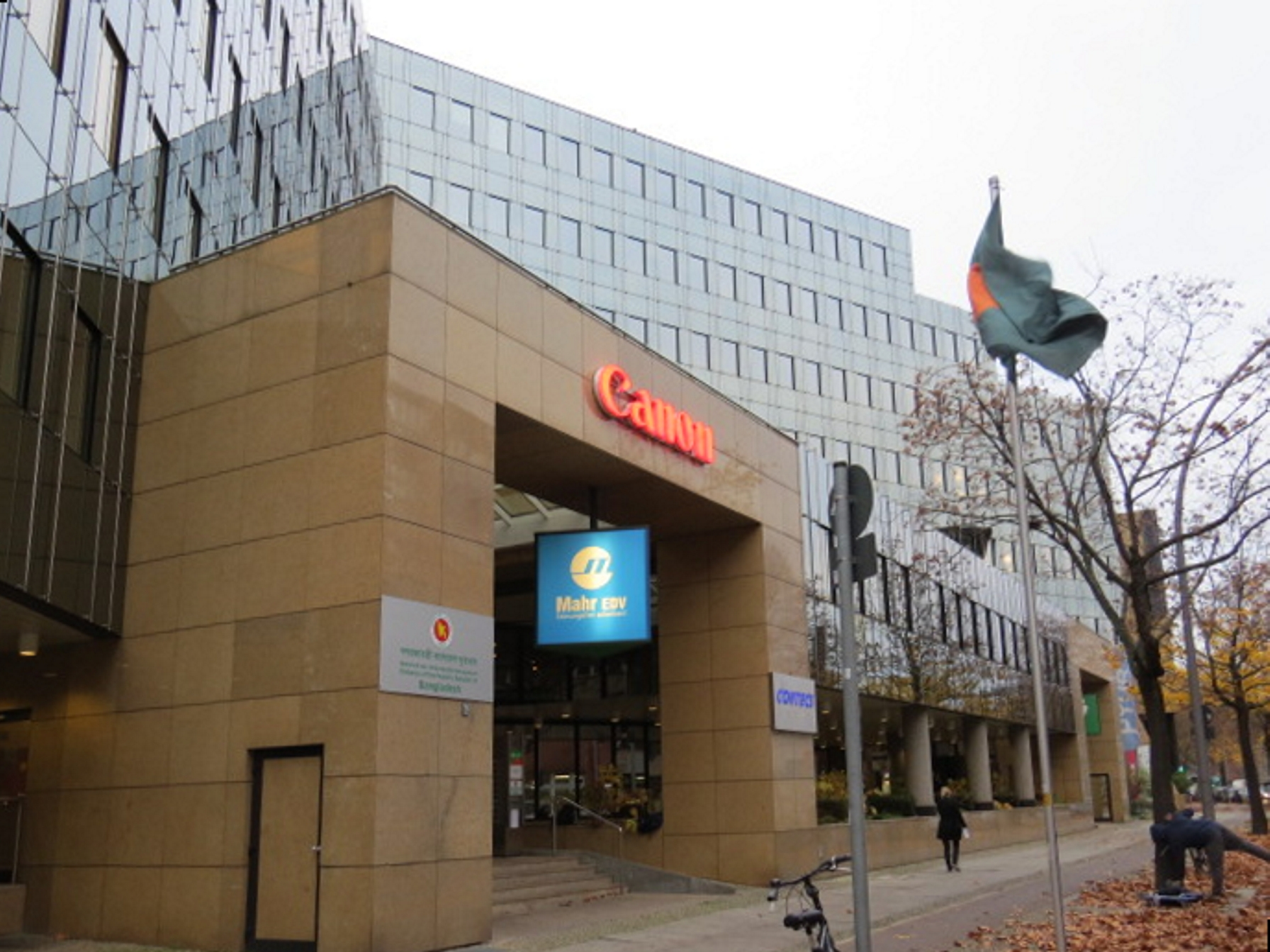
- Embassy of Bangladesh, Berlin
- Address: Kaiserin-Augusta-Allee 111, 10553 Berlin, Germany
- Coordinates: 52°31′32″N 13°19′12″E
- Opened: 1972
- Ambassador: Muhammad Zulqar Nain
- Jurisdiction: Germany, Czech Republic, Kosovo
- Website: Embassy, Berlin

The Embassy of Bangladesh, Berlin is the diplomatic mission of Bangladesh in Germany. It is headed by the ambassador of Bangladesh to Germany.

== History ==
After the Bangladesh War of Independence in 1971, East Germany was the third country in the world, and the first in Europe, to officially recognize Bangladesh in 1972. The former West Germany recognized Bangladesh about three weeks later on 4 February 1972.

=== West Germany ===
On 4 February 1972, Bangladesh and the West Germany established diplomatic relations. The Embassy of Bangladesh was located at Bonner Straße 48 in Bonn-Bad Godesberg. The Ambassador's residence was in Königswinter in the listed villa at Am Lessing 6 .

=== East Germany ===
The East Germany and Bangladesh established diplomatic relations on 16 January 1972. The embassy in East Berlin was located at Clara-Zetkin-Straße 97 (renamed Dorotheenstraße in 1995 ) in the Mitte district . The building on the corner of Wilhelmstraße also housed the embassies of Guinea-Bissau , the People's Republic of the Congo, Mozambique, Somalia, Spain, and Uruguay. In October 1990 after German reunification, the embassy in East Berlin was marged with embassy at Bonn.

=== Unified Germany ===
Following German reunification and the relocation of the federal government Bonn to Berlin, the Bangladeshi diplomats sought a new location in the capital. They rented the entire fifth floor of the ten-story Spreetower business and commercial center at Dovestraße 1 in Berlin-Charlottenburg and moved in on November 1, 1999. The embassy remained there until approximately 2016, when the building, constructed in 1972, was demolished.

The embassy then moved to Kaiserin-Augusta-Allee 111 in Berlin-Moabitis. The office building, constructed in 1995 and is located directly on the Spree River. Here, the embassy again rented a floor for its purposes. A new building for the embassy, designed by Peter Ruge Architects , is planned for Tiergartenstrasse next to the Canisius-Kolleg Berlin.

== Consulate ==
Currently, consular services are provided only through the Consulate Section of the embassy. In 2025, the Interim Government of Bangladesh is planning to establish a new consulate in Frankfurt.
