= Embassy of Vietnam, Berlin =

Embassy in Berlin

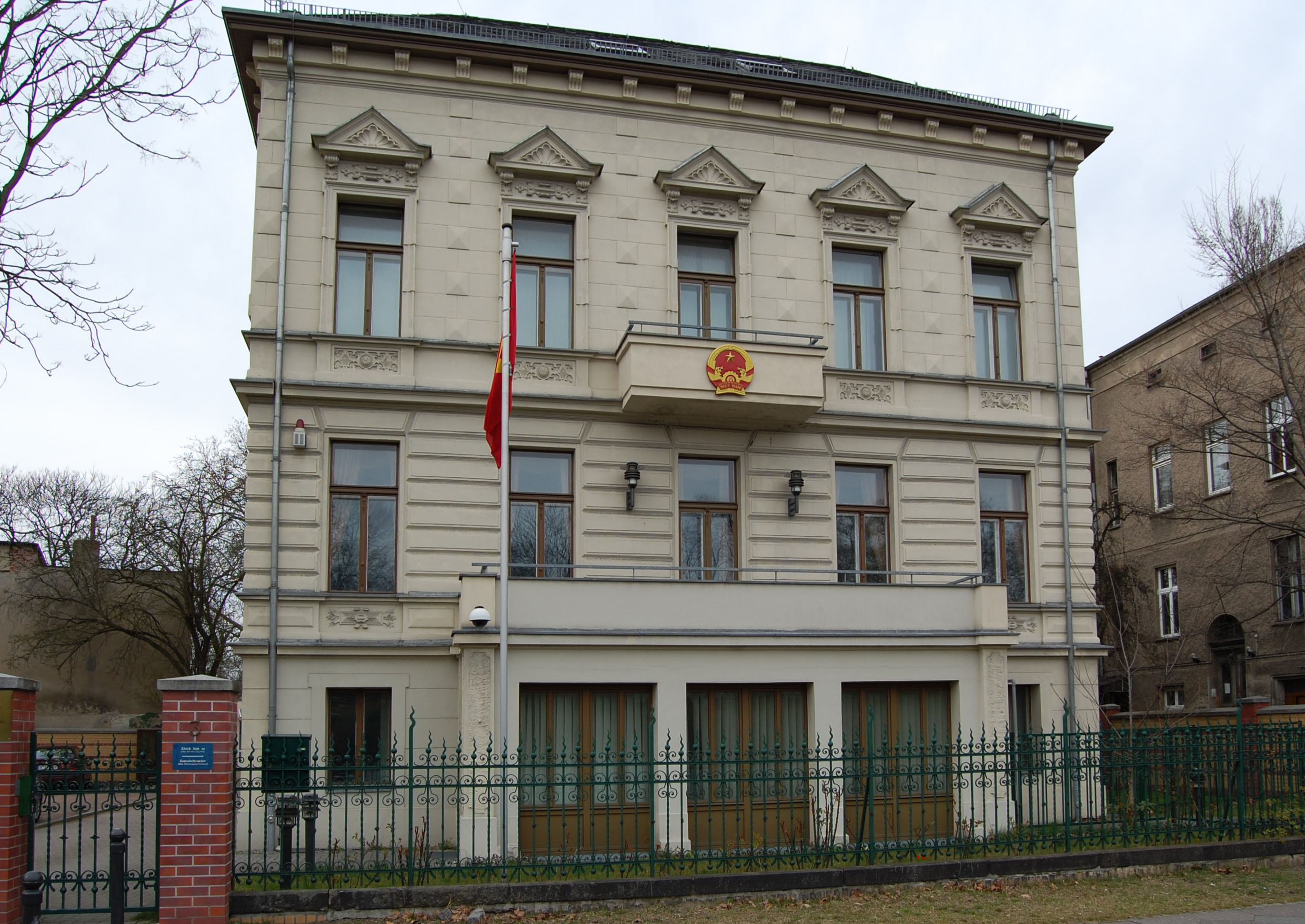
- Location: Berlin
- Address: Elsenstraße 3
- Coordinates: 52.4936°N 13.4594°E
- Ambassador: Nguyễn Đắc Thành
- Website: vnembassy-berlin.mofa.gov.vn/en-us/embassy/EmbassyStaffs/Pages/default.aspx

The Embassy of Vietnam in Berlin (Vietnamese: Đại sứ quán Việt Nam tại Đức) is the diplomatic mission of the Socialist Republic of Vietnam to the Federal Republic of Germany. The embassy building is located at Elsenstraße 3 of Berlin's Alt-Treptow of district Treptow-Köpenick. The incumbent ambassador is Vu Quang Minh.

== Kidnapping case ==
In 2017, the Vietnamese kidnapped Trịnh Xuân Thanh, a former Vietnamese politician and businessman, he was head of the state-owned Petrovietnam Construction JSC (a subsidiary of Petrovietnam), and the former Deputy-Chairman of Provincial People's Committee. In Vietnam, he was accused of causing massive losses at the state-owned company. While in Berlin, as an asylum-seeker, he was kidnapped in broad daylight in Tiergarten. Vietnamese intelligence service agents from TC2 drove the kidnapped man to the Vietnamese embassy. He was repatriated to Vietnam on 23 July 2017, which led Germany to expel a Vietnamese diplomat. He later said on Vietnam television that he had decided to turn himself in to Vietnamese authorities. However, there have been suggestions that this statement was possibly made under duress. Thanh was sentenced to life imprisonment on 22 January 2018.

A man from Vietnam, who was involved in the kidnapping was arrested by the federal prosecutor and sent to prison after a German trial.

== See also ==
- Germany–Vietnam relations
