= Embassy of Madagascar, Falkensee =

Coordinates: 52°34′22″N 13°07′16″E

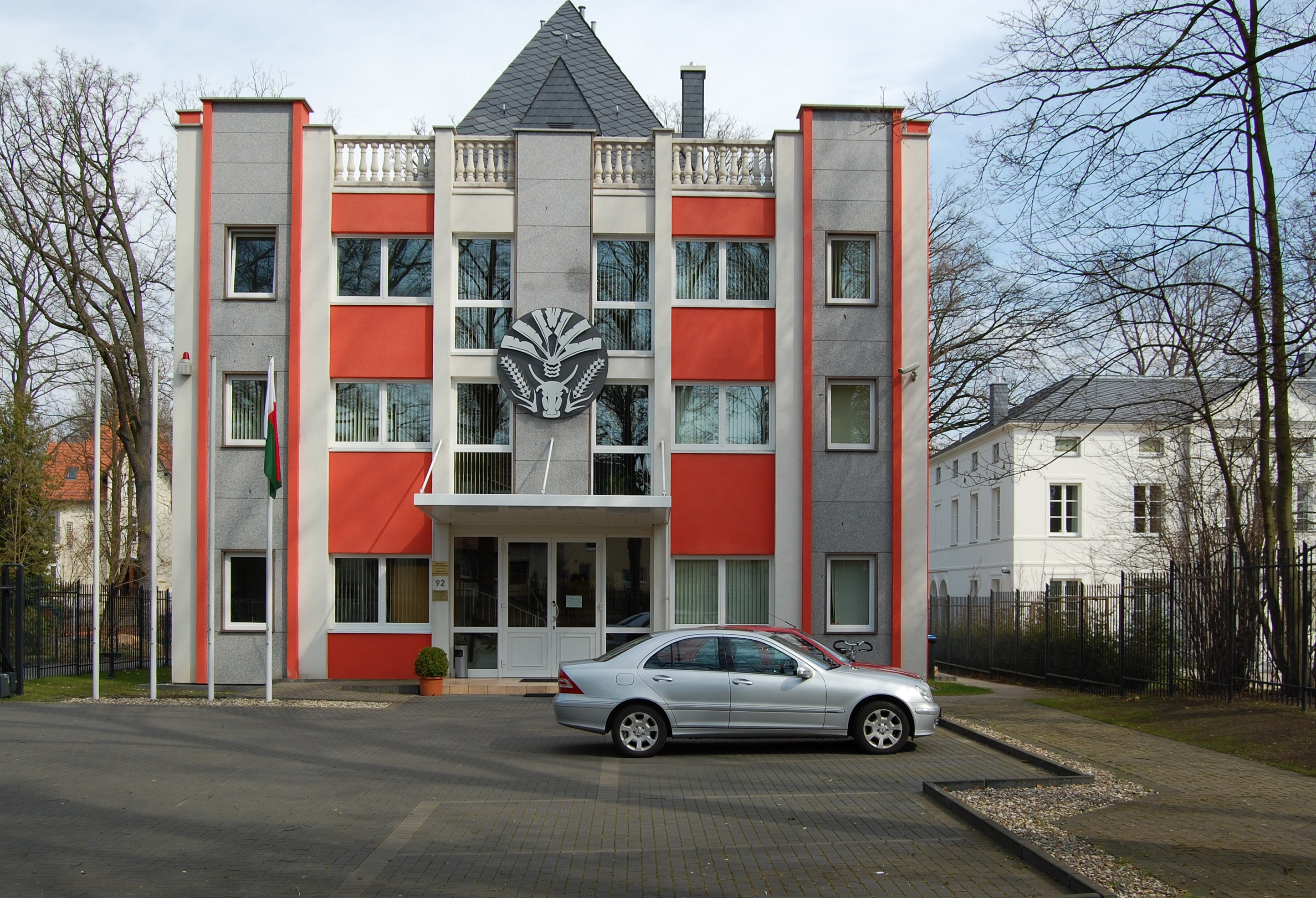
Embassy of Madagascar in Falkensee

The Embassy of Madagascar in Falkensee is the diplomatic representation of Madagascar in Germany. They also represent Madagascan interests in Austria, the Czech Republic, Estonia, Denmark, Hungary, Lithuania, Poland, and Iceland. The chancery is located on the Seepromenade 92 on the banks of the Falkenhagener See in the town of Falkensee, Brandenburg, just outside of Berlin.

== History of diplomatic relations ==
Madagascar established diplomatic relations with the Federal Republic of Germany in 1961, shortly after the country became independent from France. The Embassy of Madagascar has been located in Falkensee since December 2001. Recent ambassadors of Madagascar to Germany include Radafiarisoa Léa Raholinirina (21 January 2003 – February 2006), Alphonse Ralison (20 March 2006 – 2009), followed by Lea Raholinirina. Since June 2016, the ambassador is Florence Isabelle Rafaramalala.

== Chancery ==
The embassy and the ambassador's residence are housed in a single building, designed by the Malagasy architect Henri Randrianarisoa and build by the German construction firm Fundamenta. Randrianarisoa incorporated elements of the Rova of Antananarivo, the former 17th century royal palace of Madagascar, as well as colonial-era and modern Malagasy design elements into the building.

The chancery has three floors and a nearly square base, with four risalits extending from each corner. The entire house is accented in a red earth tone, symbolizing the brick-red soil of Madagascar. The front is dominated by the central entrance, over which the seal of Madagascar (a stylized Emblem of the Malagasy Republic) is displayed. The façade ends with a balustrade consisting of small columns in the European Baroque style. Behind it rises a steep and shingled tent roof in a design typical of Malagasy architecture.

== Literature ==
- Kerstin Englert, Jürgen Tietz (ed.): Botschaften in Berlin. 2. Edition; Gebr. Mann Verlag, Berlin 2004; Seite 292, ISBN 3-7861-2494-9
