= Franconia Day =

The Franconian flag

Franconia Day or Tag der Franken ("Day of the Franconians") was created in 2006 following a decision by the Bavarian Landtag and has been celebrated annually since then on 2 July or on the weekend immediately following. It is intended to highlight the diverse landscape and history of the Franconian region and to raise awareness of Franconia's potential for development and innovation. The central festive event is held alternately in and by the three governmental districts in Bavaria that comprise Franconia—Lower Franconia, Middle Franconia and Upper Franconia—and has the character of a state festival day. Its predecessor were the events held since 1999 by the Fränkischer Bund and other organisers.

== Literature ==
- Der Tag der Franken. Geschichte – Anspruch – Wirklichkeit (= Geschichte und Kultur in Mittelfranken Bd. 1), hg. vom Bezirk Mittelfranken durch Andrea M. Kluxen und Julia Hecht, Würzburg 2010
- Handbuch der bayerischen Geschichte, begr. v. Max Spindler, Bd. III/1: Geschichte Frankens bis zúm Ausgang des 18. Jahrhunderts, München 1997
- Schöler, Eugen: Fränkische Wappen erzählen Geschichte und Geschichten, Neustadt/Aisch 1992
